= List of the Cenozoic life of California =

This list of the Cenozoic life of California contains the various prehistoric life-forms whose fossilized remains have been reported from within the US state of California and are between 66 million and 10,000 years of age.

== A ==
- †Abantis
  - †Abantis velifer
- Abies
  - †Abies concoloroides
  - †Abies klamathensis
- †Aboma
  - †Aboma antiqua – type locality for species
- †Acalypha
  - †Acalypha aequalis
- Acanthina
  - †Acanthina spirata
- Acanthocardia
  - †Acanthocardia brewerii – type locality for species
  - †Acanthocardia sorrentoense
- Acar
  - †Acar bailyi – or unidentified comparable form
- Accipiter
  - †Accipiter velox
- Acentrophryne
  - †Acentrophryne longidens
- Acer
  - †Acer aequidentatum
  - †Acer scottiae
- Acesta
  - †Acesta multiradiata
- †Achaenodon
  - †Achaenodon robustus – or unidentified comparable form
- Acila
  - †Acila castrensis
  - †Acila conradi
  - †Acila decisa
  - †Acila gabbiana
  - †Acila muta
  - †Acila semirostrata – or unidentified comparable form
  - †Acila shumardi
- Acipenser
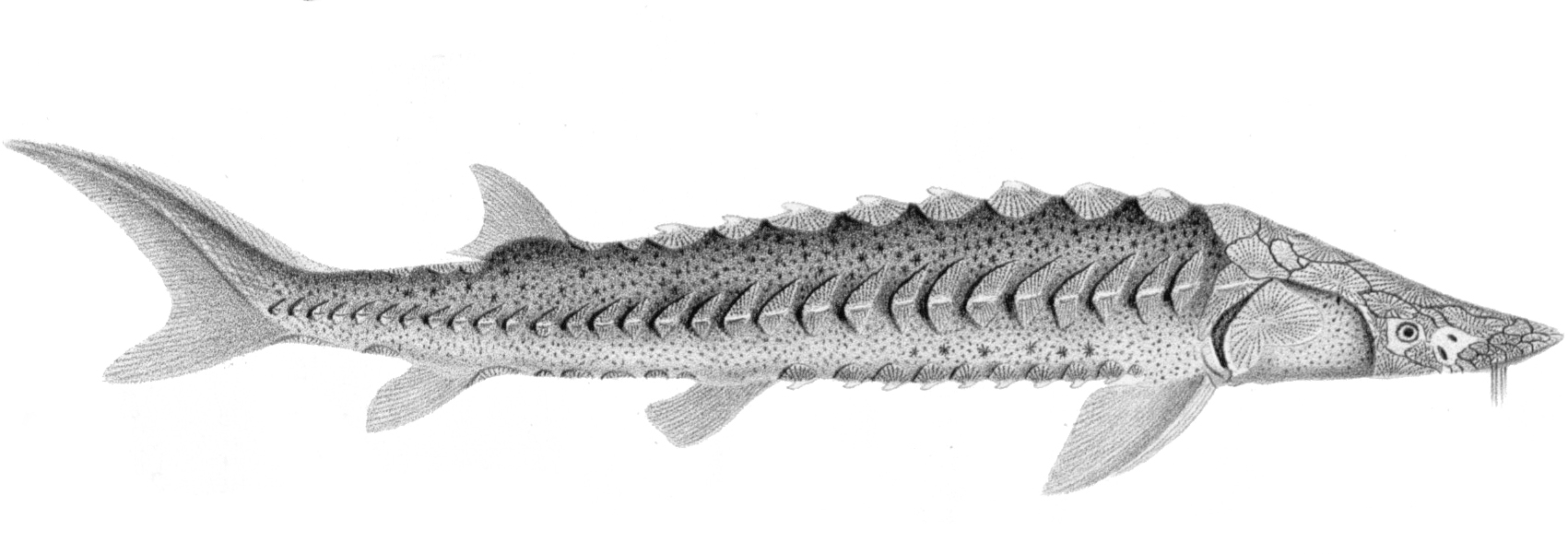
  - Illustration of a living Acipenser medirostris, or green sturgeon
    †Acipenser medirostris – or unidentified comparable form
- Acmaea
  - †Acmaea dickersoni – or unidentified related form
  - †Acmaea digitalis – or unidentified comparable form
  - †Acmaea insessa
  - †Acmaea limatula
  - †Acmaea mitra
  - †Acmaea persona
  - †Acmaea ruckmani – or unidentified comparable form
  - †Acmaea tejonensis – or unidentified comparable form
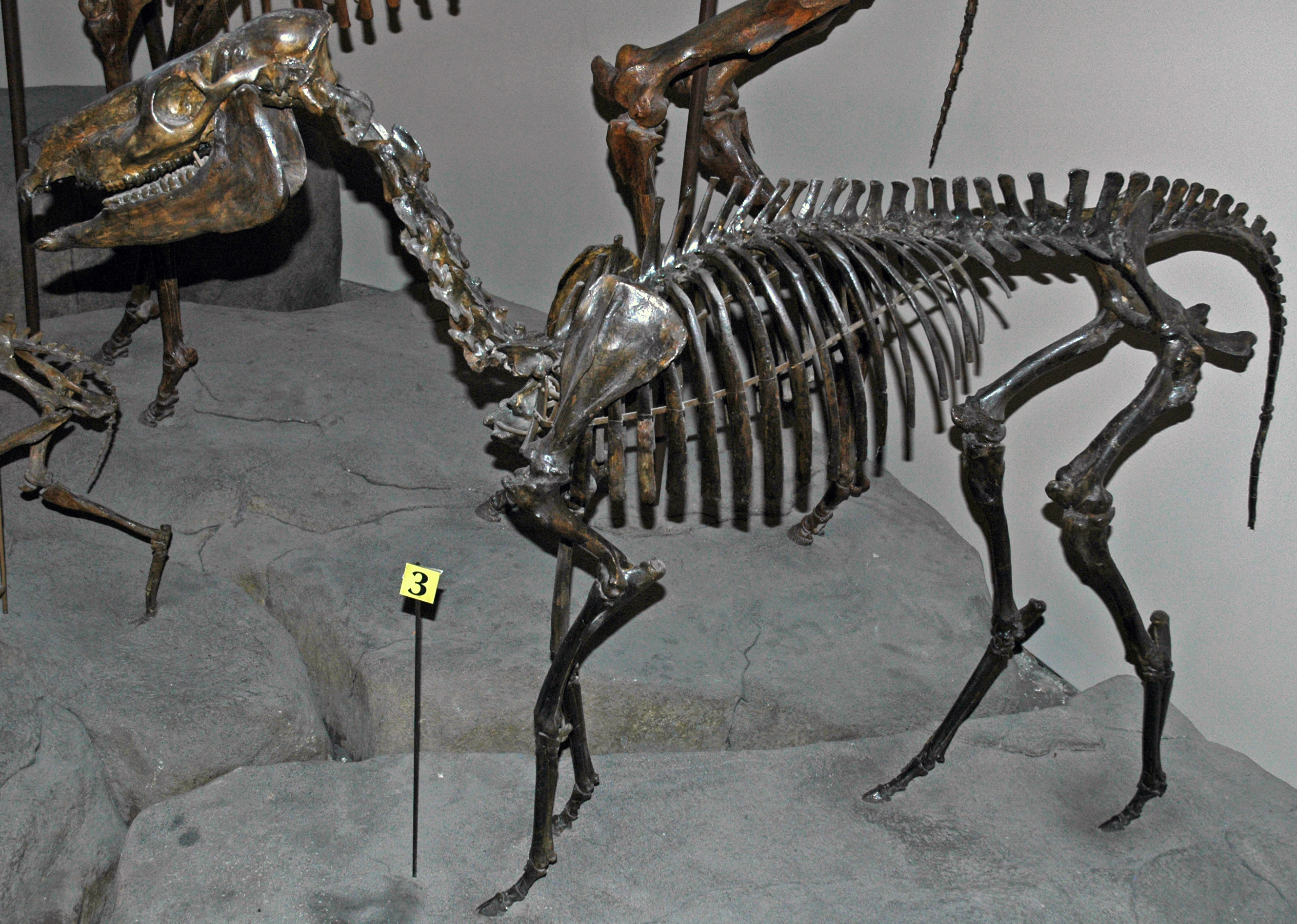
- Mounted fossilized skeleton of the Miocene horse Acritohippus
  †Acritohippus
  - †Acritohippus isonesus – or unidentified comparable form
  - †Acritohippus quinni – type locality for species
  - †Acritohippus stylodontus
  - †Acritohippus tertius – or unidentified comparable form
- †Acritoparamys – or unidentified comparable form
- Acteocina
  - †Acteocina culcitella
  - †Acteocina inculta
  - †Acteocina magdalensis
- Acteon
  - †Acteon boulderanus
  - †Acteon lawsoni
  - †Acteon punctocaelatus
  - †Acteon traski
- Actinemys
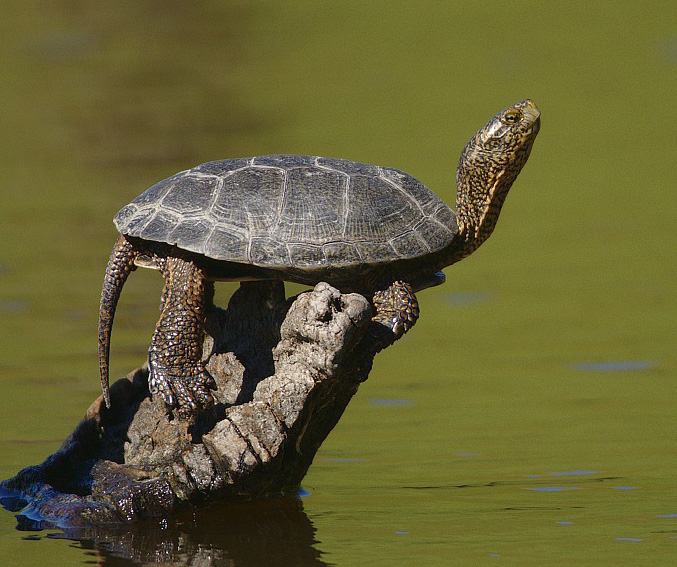
  - A living Actinemys marmorata, or western pond turtle
    †Actinemys marmorata
- †Acutostrea
  - †Acutostrea idriaensis
  - †Acutostrea miguelensis
- Admete
  - †Admete rhyssa
- Adula
  - †Adula californiensis
  - †Adula diegensis
- Aechmophorus
  - †Aechmophorus elasson
  - †Aechmophorus occidentalis
- †Aechomophorus
  - †Aechomophorus occidentalis
- †Aeila
  - †Aeila decisa
- †Aelurodon
  - †Aelurodon asthenostylus
  - †Aelurodon taxoides
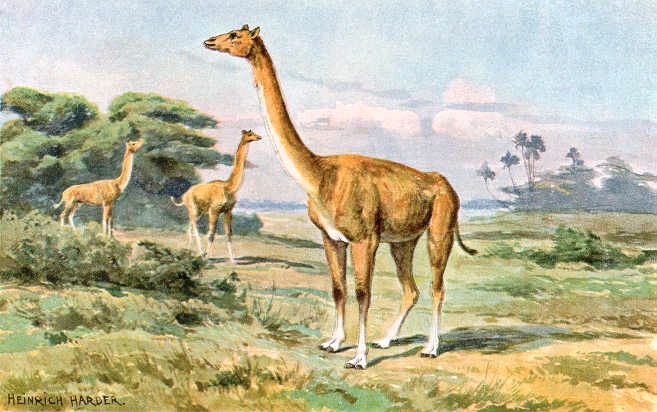
- Life restoration of the Miocene camel Aepycamelus, or the long-necked camel. Heinrich Harder (1920).
  †Aepycamelus
  - †Aepycamelus alexandrae
- Aequipecten
  - †Aequipecten andersoni
- Aesopus
  - †Aesopus chrysalloides
- Aethia
  - †Aethia barnesi – type locality for species
  - †Aethia rossmoori – type locality for species
- †Aethomylos
  - †Aethomylos simplicidens
- Agaronia
  - †Agaronia mathewsoni – or unidentified comparable form
  - †Agaronia mathewsonii – or unidentified comparable form
- †Agasoma
  - †Agasoma acuminatum
  - †Agasoma gravida
  - †Agasoma gravidum
  - †Agasoma kerrianum
  - †Agasoma sinuata
- Agelaius
  - †Agelaius phoeniceuus
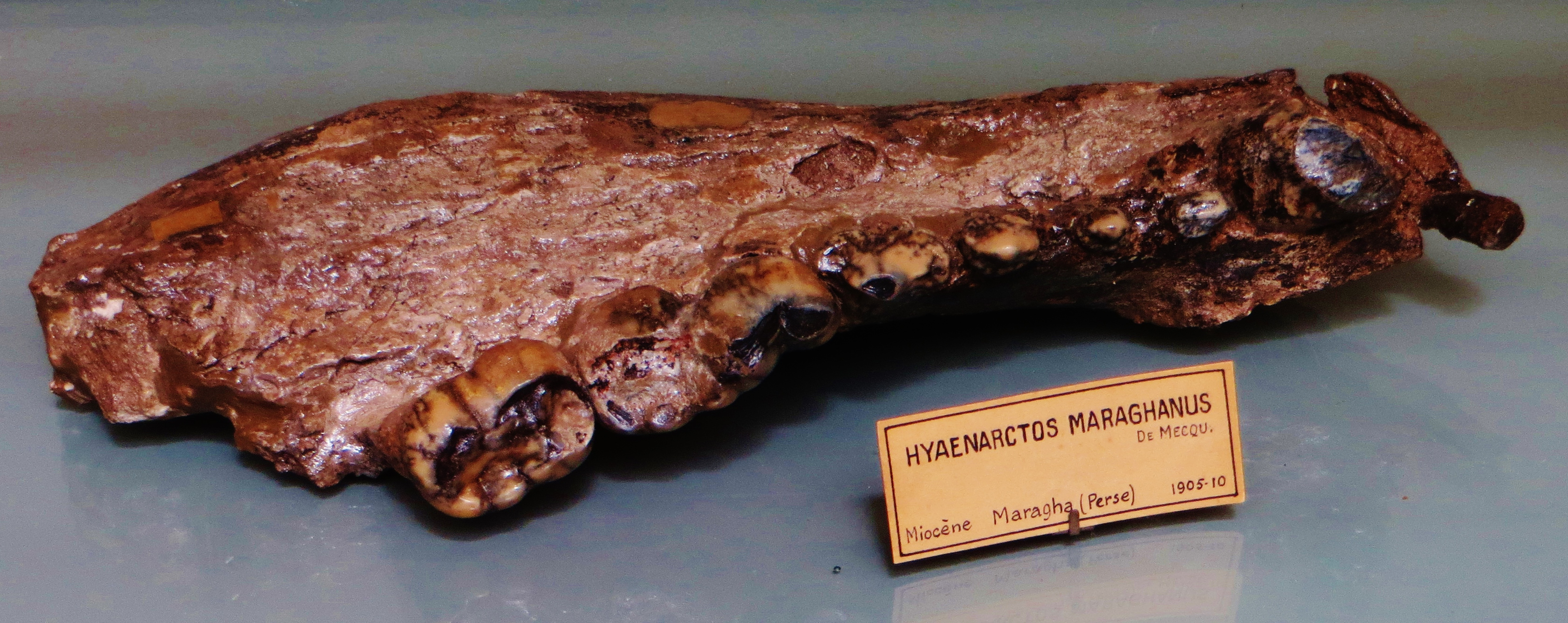
- Fossilized mandible of the Miocene-Pleistocene bear Agriotherium
  †Agriotherium
- †Ailanthus
  - †Ailanthus lesquereuxi
- Akera
  - †Akera maga
- Alaba
  - †Alaba catalinensis
  - †Alaba jeannettae
- Alabina
  - †Alabina io – or unidentified comparable form
  - †Alabina tenuisculpta
- †Albicetus
  - †Albicetus oxymycterus – type locality for species
- †Albireo
  - †Albireo savagei – type locality for species
- Alca
- †Alcodes
  - †Alcodes ulnulus – type locality for species
- Aleochara
- Aletes
  - †Aletes squamigerus
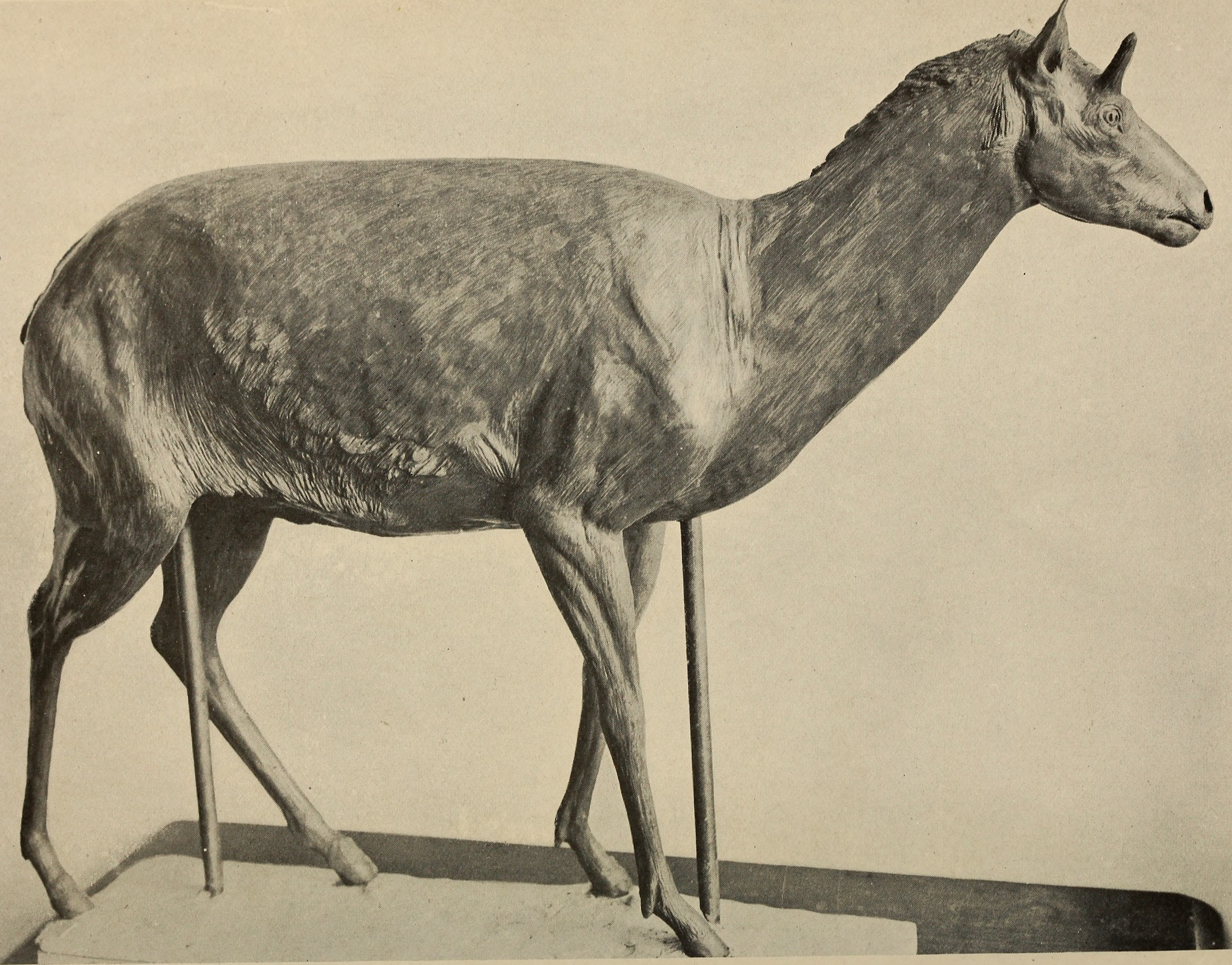
- Restorative model of the Miocene deer relative Aletomeryx
  †Aletomeryx
  - †Aletomeryx occidentalis – type locality for species
- †Alforjas
- Aligena
  - †Aligena cerritensis
- †Alilepus
  - †Alilepus hibbardi
- †Alisea – type locality for genus
  - †Alisea grandis – type locality for species
- †Allodelphis – type locality for genus
  - †Allodelphis pratti – type locality for species
  - †Allodelphis woodburnei – type locality for species
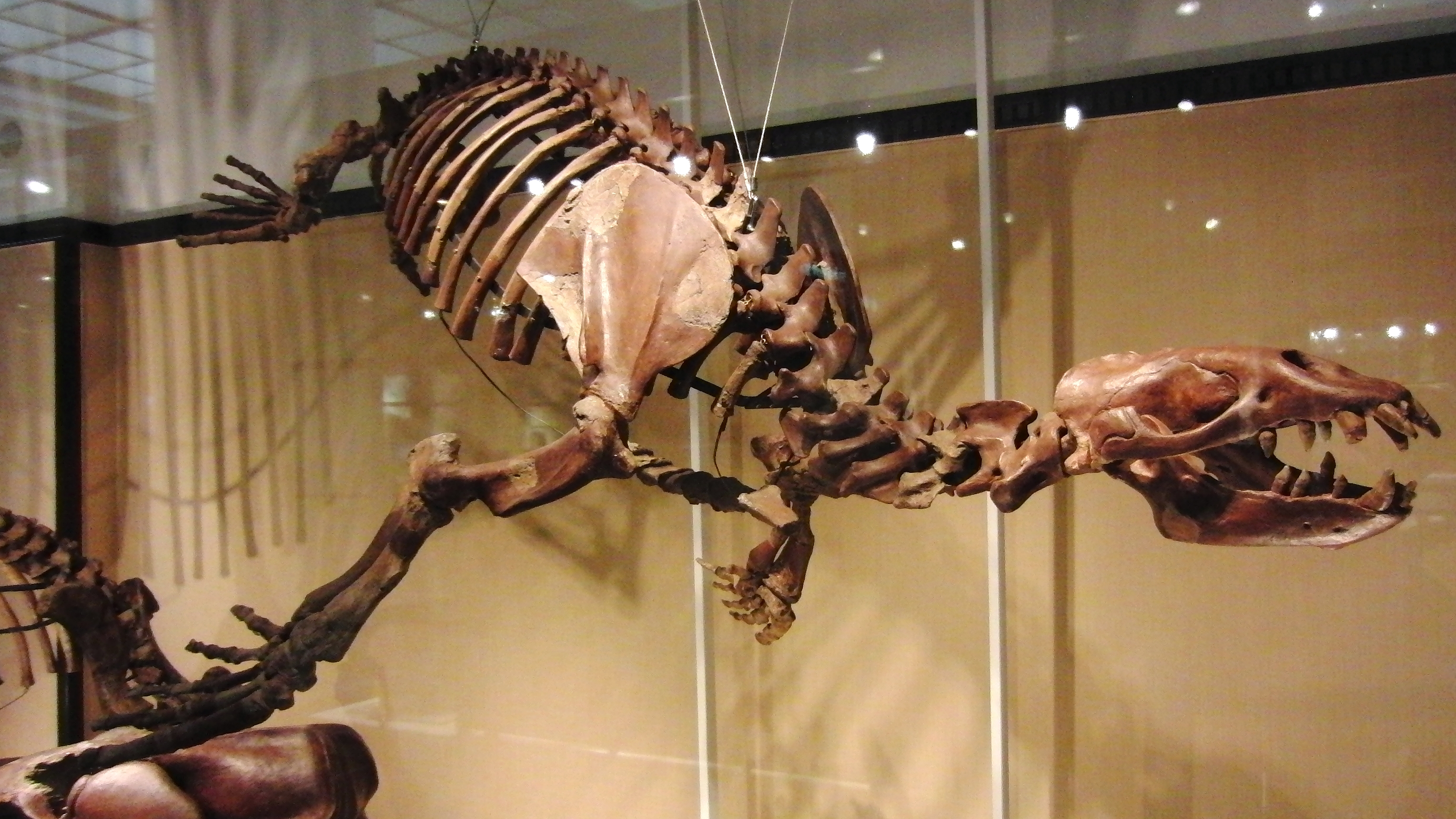
- Fossilized skeleton of the Miocene seal Allodesmus
  †Allodesmus
  - †Allodesmus gracilis – type locality for species
  - †Allodesmus kelloggi – type locality for species
  - †Allodesmus kernensis
- †Alluvisorex
  - †Alluvisorex chasseae – type locality for species
- Alnus
  - †Alnus corrallina
  - †Alnus operia
- †Alopecocyon – type locality for genus
  - †Alopecocyon leardi – type locality for species
- Alopias
  - †Alopias exigua – or unidentified comparable form
  - †Alopias latidens
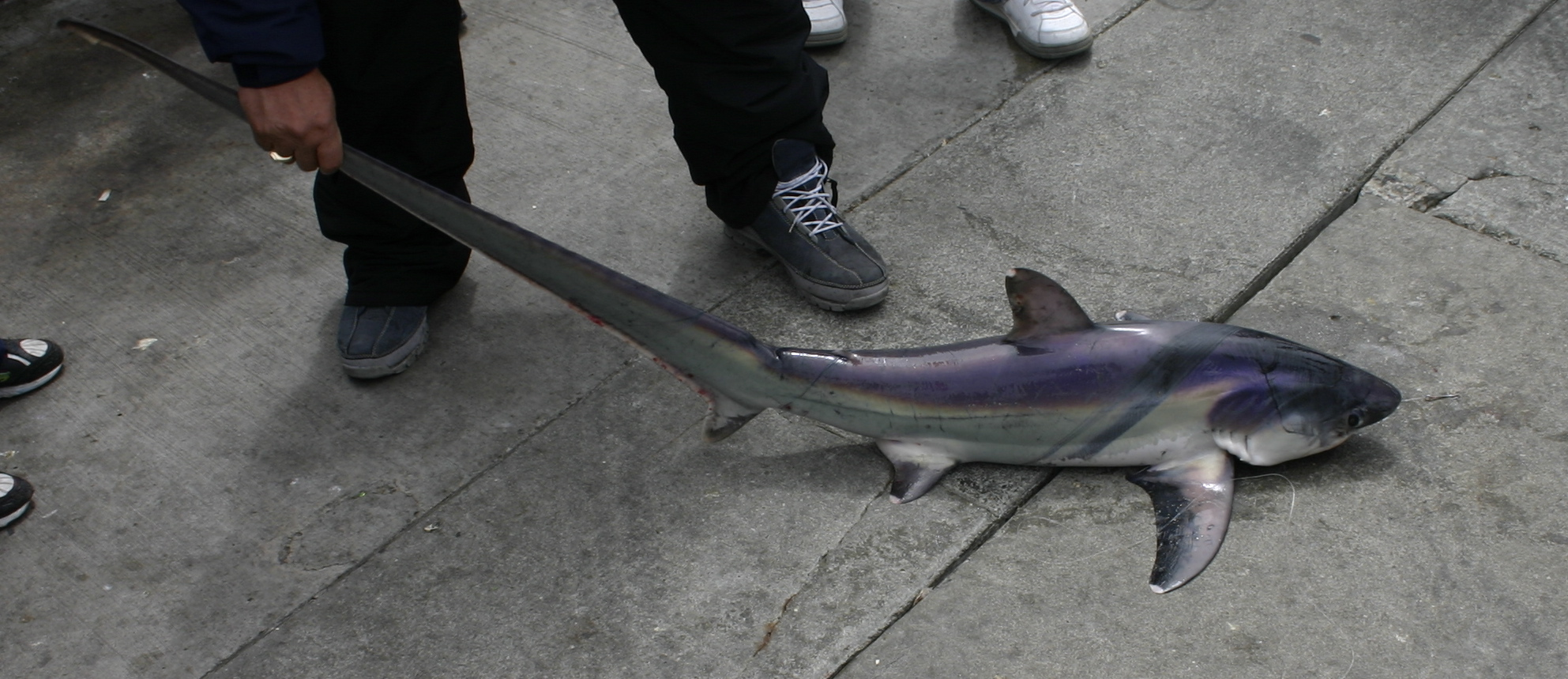
  - Caught Alopias vulpinus, or common thresher
    †Alopias vulpinus – or unidentified comparable form
- Alvania
  - †Alvania acutelirata
  - †Alvania compacta
  - †Alvania iliuliukensis – or unidentified related form
- †Alveojunctus
  - †Alveojunctus bowni – type locality for species
- Amaea
- Amara
  - †Amara insignis
- †Amaurellina
  - †Amaurellina caleocia
  - †Amaurellina martinezensis
  - †Amaurellina moragai
- Amauropsis
  - †Amauropsis alveata
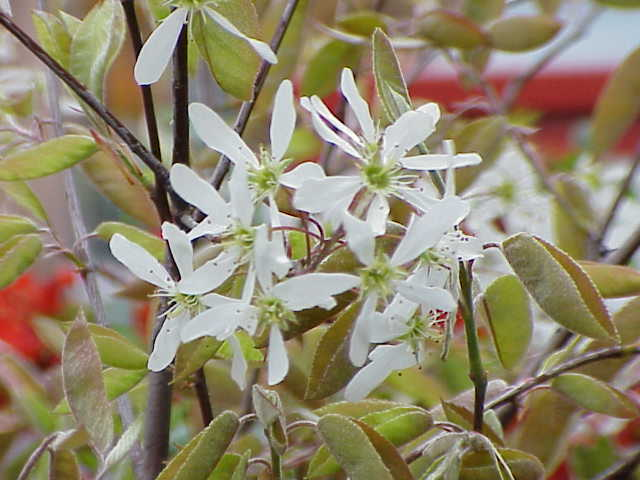
- Flowers and foliage of Amelanchier, or shadbush
  Amelanchier
- Amiantis
  - †Amiantis – type locality for species informal
  - †Amiantis callosa
  - †Amiantis diabloensis
  - †Amiantis mathewsoni
- Ammobaculites
  - †Ammobaculites cubensis
  - †Ammobaculites strathearnensis – type locality for species
- Ammospermophilus
  - †Ammospermophilus fossilis
- †Amorpha
  - †Amorpha condonii
  - †Amorpha oklahomensis
- †Amphicyon
  - †Amphicyon ingens
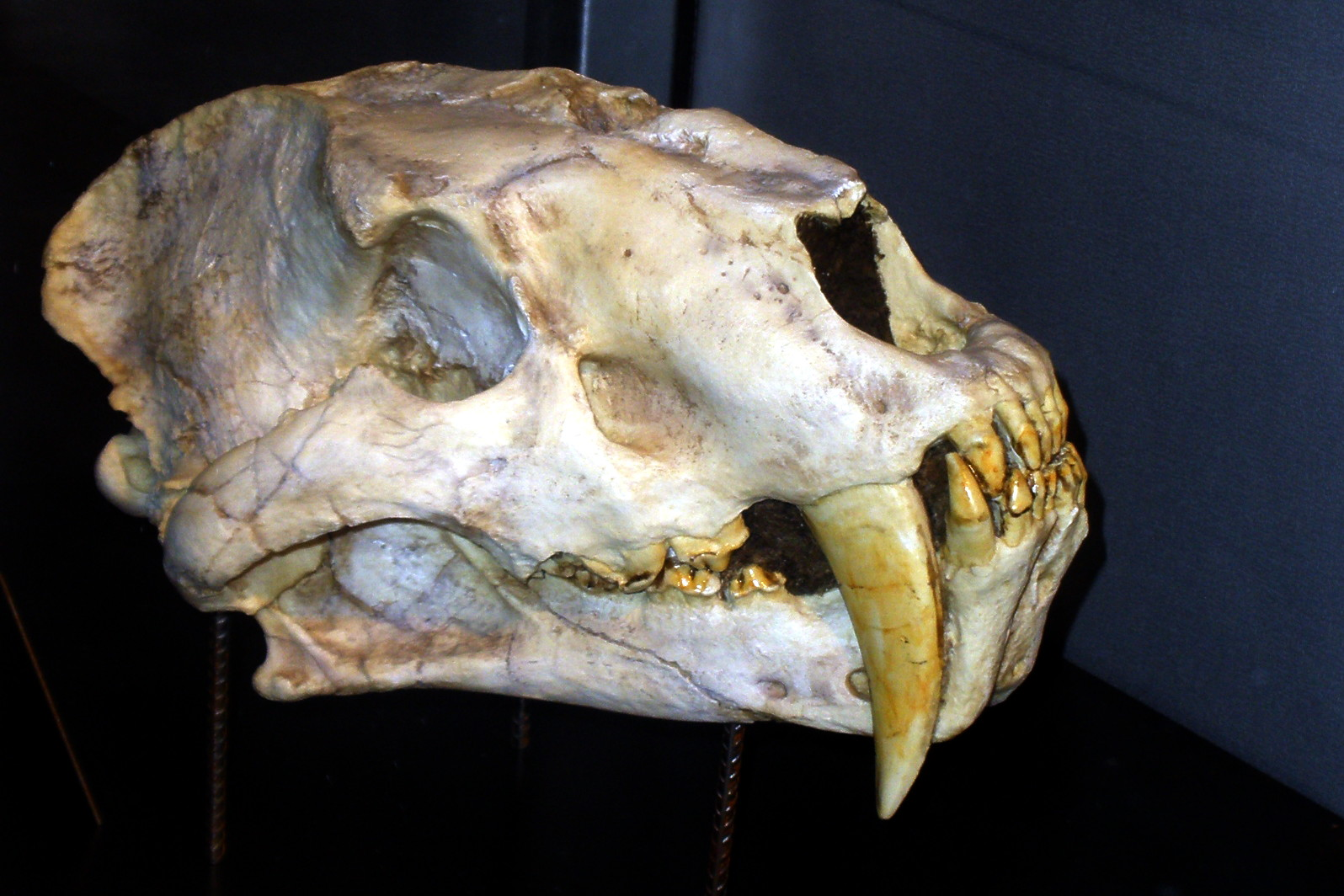
- Fossilized skull of the Miocene saber-toothed cat Amphimachairodus
  †Amphimachairodus
  - †Amphimachairodus coloradensis – or unidentified comparable form
- Amphimorphina
  - †Amphimorphina ignota
- Amphissa
  - †Amphissa columbiana
  - †Amphissa reticulata
  - †Amphissa ventricosa
  - †Amphissa versicolor
- Amphiura
  - †Amphiura santaecrucis
- †Amphora
  - †Amphora ovalis
  - †Amphora perpusilla
- †Ampullina
  - †Ampullina schencki – or unidentified comparable form
- Amusium
  - †Amusium lompocensis
- †Amussiopecten
  - †Amussiopecten vanvlecki
- †Amynodon
  - †Amynodon advenus – or unidentified comparable form
  - †Amynodon reedi
- †Amynodontopsis
  - †Amynodontopsis bodei – type locality for species
- Anachis
  - †Anachis coronata
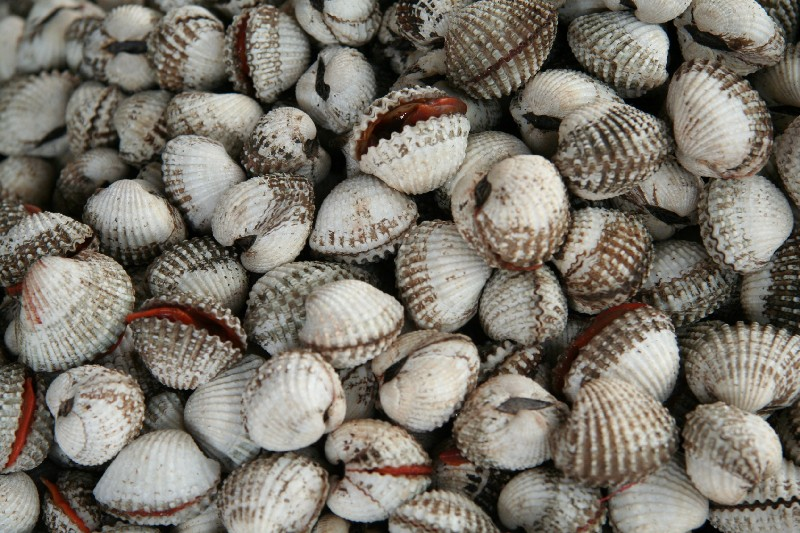
- Collection of Anadara marine ark clams
  Anadara
  - †Anadara devincta
  - †Anadara obispoana
  - †Anadara osmonti
  - †Anadara perlabiata
  - †Anadara reinharti
  - †Anadara rivulata
  - †Anadara santana – type locality for species
  - †Anadara submontereyana
  - †Anadara trilineata
- Anaphothrips
  - †Anaphothrips vitreus – type locality for species
- Anas
  - †Anas americana
  - †Anas carolinense
  - †Anas clypeata
  - †Anas platyrhynchos
- †Anchitheriomys – or unidentified comparable form
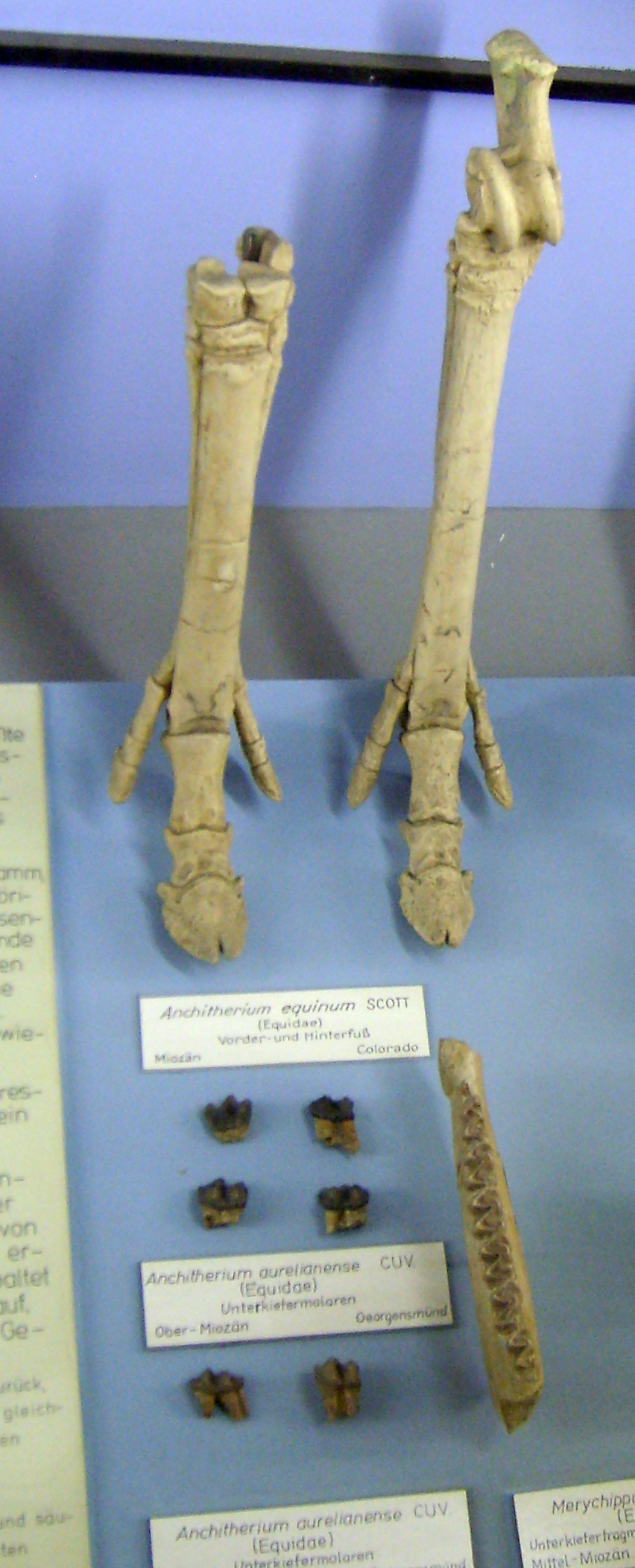
- Fossilized limb bones, and teeth of the Miocene three-toed horse Anchitherium (left)
  †Anchitherium
  - †Anchitherium clarencei
- †Anchura
  - †Anchura baptos
- Ancilla
  - †Ancilla fishii
  - †Ancilla gabbi – tentative report
- †Angelosquilla
  - †Angelosquilla altamirensis
- Angulogerina
- Angulus
  - †Angulus buttoni
  - †Angulus castacana
  - †Angulus joaquinensis
  - †Angulus jollaensis – or unidentified comparable form
  - †Angulus longa
  - †Angulus lutea – or unidentified comparable form
- Anniella
- Anodontia
  - †Anodontia edentuloides
  - †Anodontia inflata
- †Anomalina
  - †Anomalina californiensis
  - †Anomalina garzaensis
- Anomalinoides
  - †Anomalinoides globosa – or unidentified comparable form
- Anomia
  - †Anomia mcgoniglensis
  - †Anomia peruviana
  - †Anomia vaquerosensis – type locality for species
- †Ansen
  - †Ansen albifrons
- Anser
  - †Anser albifrons
- †Antecalomys
  - †Antecalomys valensis
  - †Antecalomys vasquezi
- †Antiacodon
  - †Antiacodon venustus
- Antigona
  - †Antigona undosa
- †Antilla
  - †Antilla batequensis
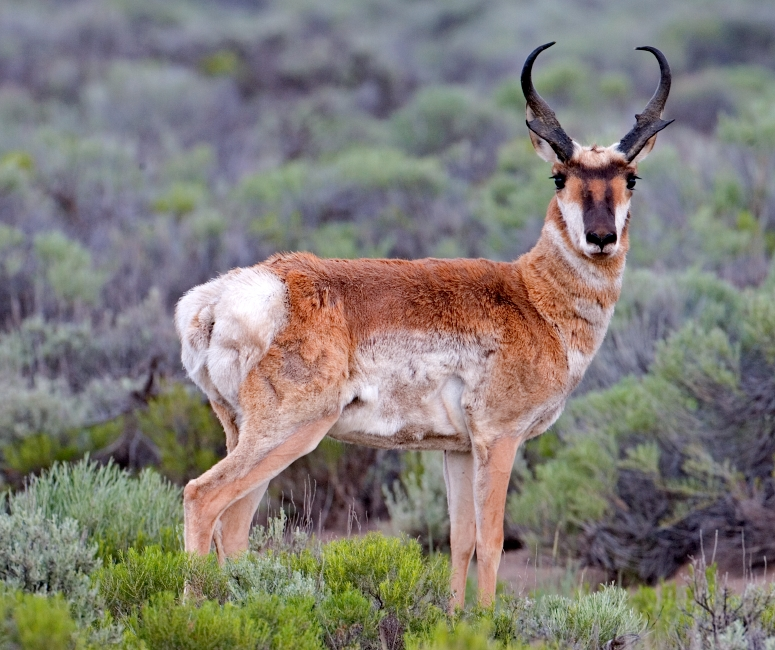
- A living Antilocapra, or pronghorn
  Antilocapra
- Antrozous
  - †Antrozous pallidus
- †Anzanycteris
  - †Anzanycteris anzensis
- †Apataelurus – or unidentified comparable form
- †Apatemys
  - †Apatemys bellus
  - †Apatemys downsi – type locality for species
  - †Apatemys uintensis
- Aphelocoma
  - †Aphelocoma californica
- †Aphelophlebodes – type locality for genus
  - †Aphelophlebodes stocki – type locality for species
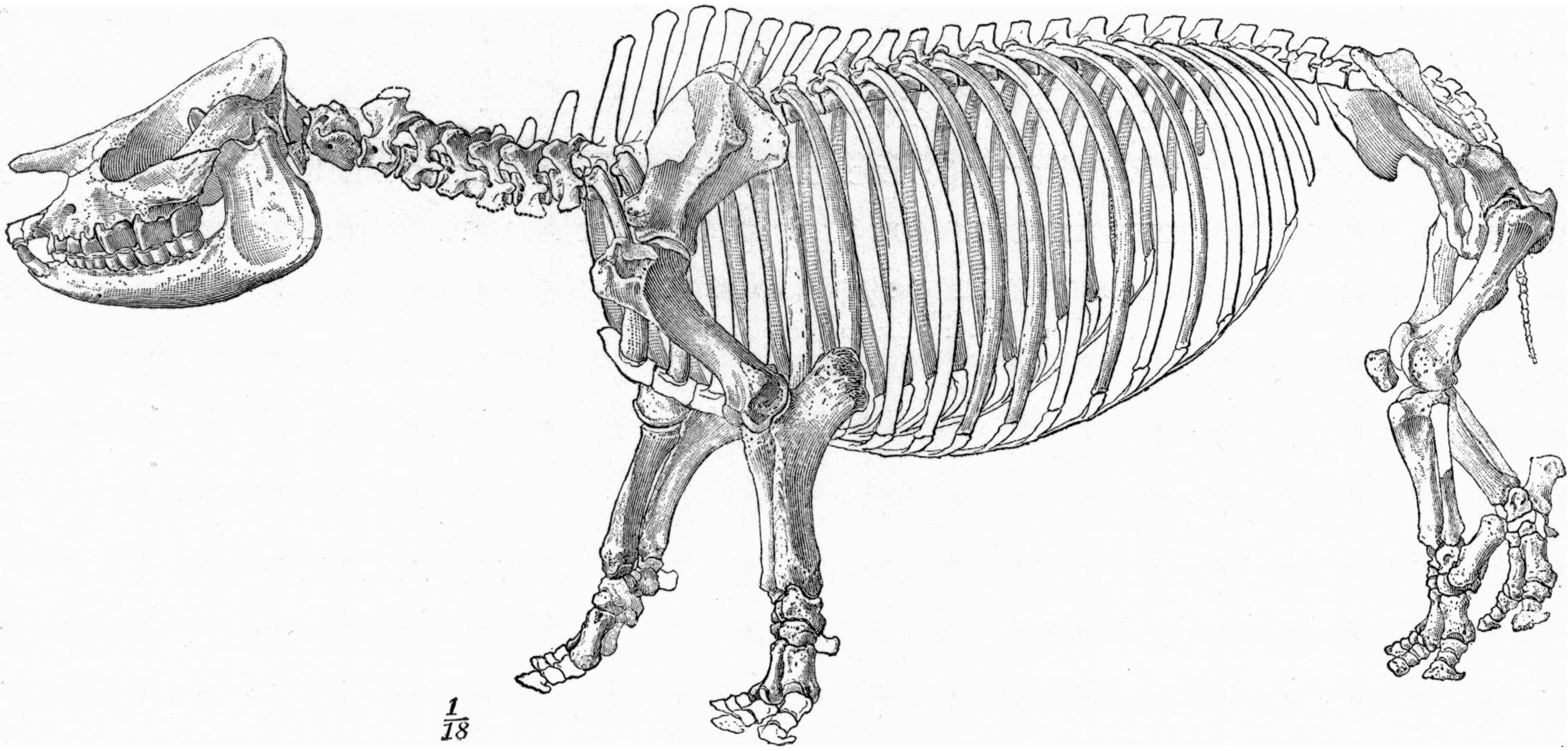
- Reconstructive illustration of the skeleton of the Miocene-Pleistocene hornless rhinoceros Aphelops
  †Aphelops
  - †Aphelops megalodus
- Apiotoma
  - †Apiotoma californiana
- Aplodontia
  - †Aplodontia rufa
- Aprionodon
- Apsena
  - †Apsena laticornis – type locality for species
  - †Apsena pubescens
  - †Apsena rufipes
- Aquila
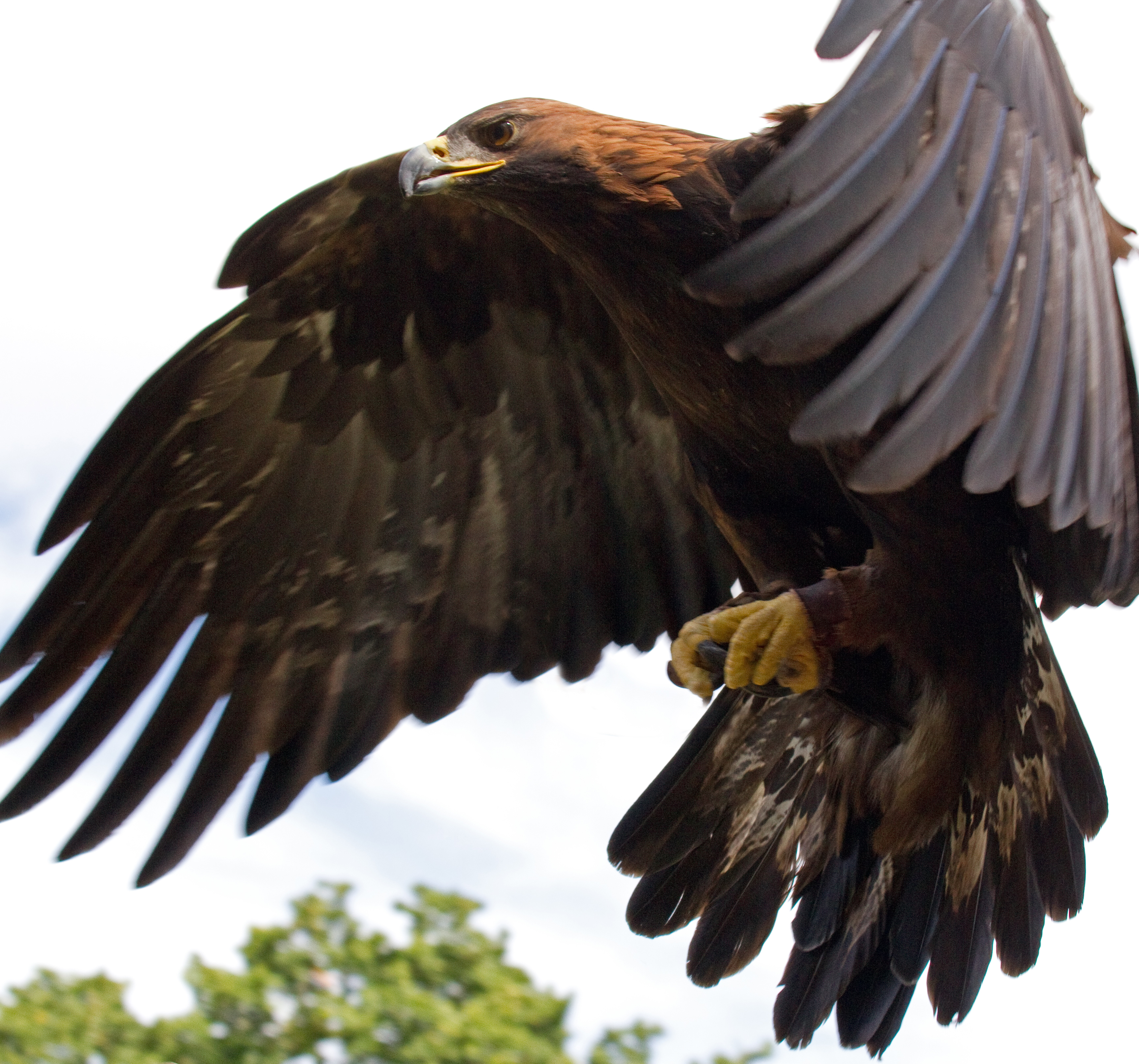
  - A living Aquila chrysaetos, or golden eagle
    Aquila chrysaetos
- †Araeosteus
  - †Araeosteus rothi
- Arbutus
  - †Arbutus matthesii
- Arca
  - †Arca hornii – type locality for species
  - †Arca montereyana
  - †Arca pacifica – or unidentified comparable form
  - †Arca santaclarana
  - †Arca sisquocensis
  - †Arca terminumbonis
- †Arceuthobium
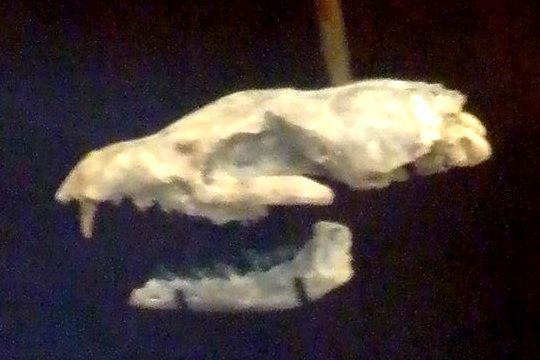
- Fossilized skull of the Oligocene bone-crushing dog Archaeocyon
  †Archaeocyon
  - †Archaeocyon pavidus
- †Archaeohippus
  - †Archaeohippus mourningi
  - †Archaeohippus ultimus
- †Archaeolagus
  - †Archaeolagus acaricolus – type locality for species
- †Archaeolithothamnion
  - †Archaeolithothamnion keenanii – or unidentified related form
- Archaeolithothamnium
  - †Archaeolithothamnium keenani – type locality for species
- †Archaeoparadoxia
  - †Archaeoparadoxia weltoni – type locality for species
- †Archibuteo
  - †Archibuteo ferrugineus
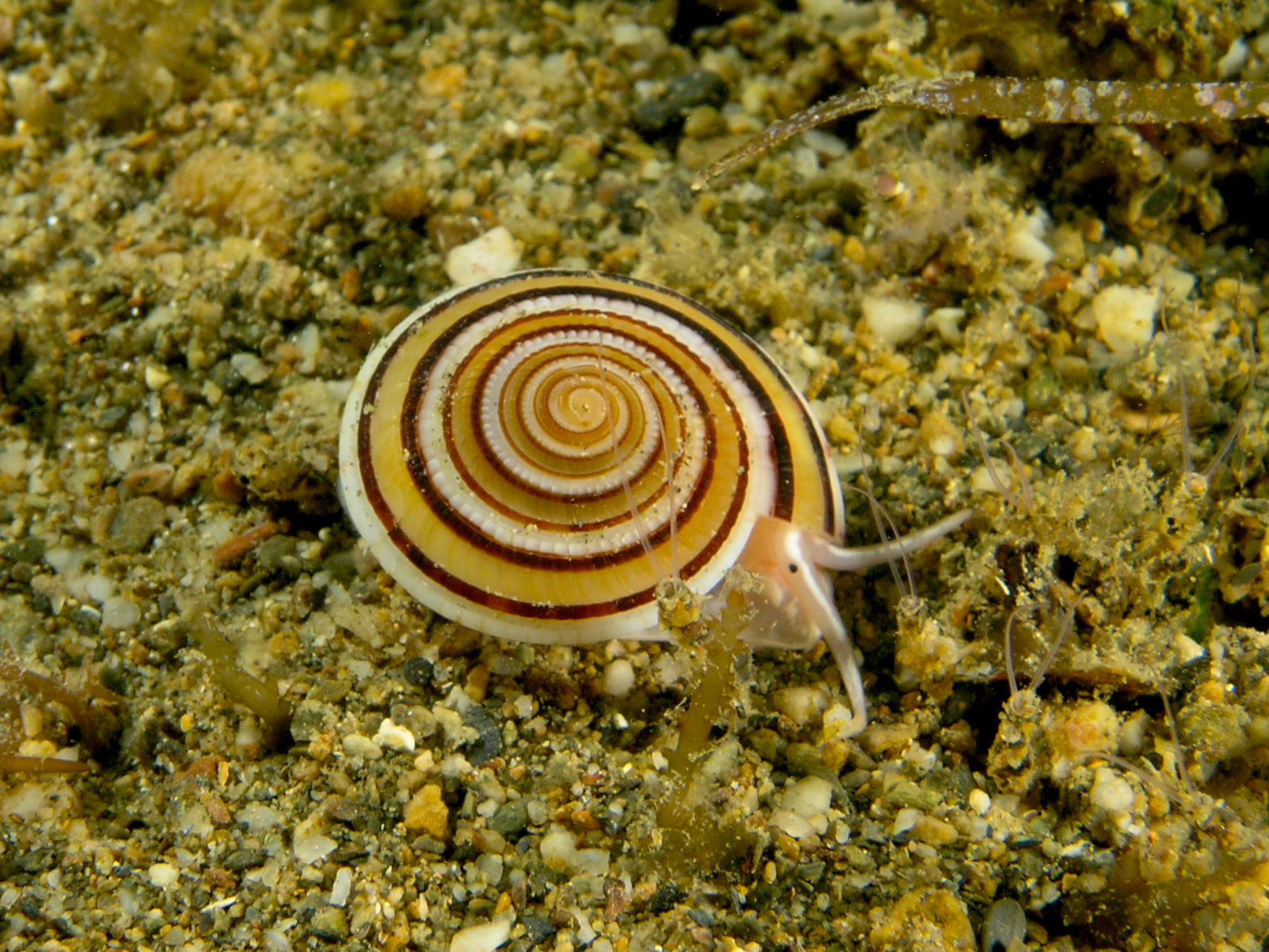
- A living Architectonica staircase shell sea snail
  Architectonica
  - †Architectonica cognata
  - †Architectonica llajasensis – type locality for species
  - †Architectonica nobilis
  - †Architectonica tuberculata
  - †Architectonica ullreyana – or unidentified comparable form
- †Archoheia – tentative report
- Archoplites
  - †Archoplites interruptus
- Arcinella
  - †Arcinella californica
- Arctica – tentative report
  - †Arctica weaveri
- Arctocephalus
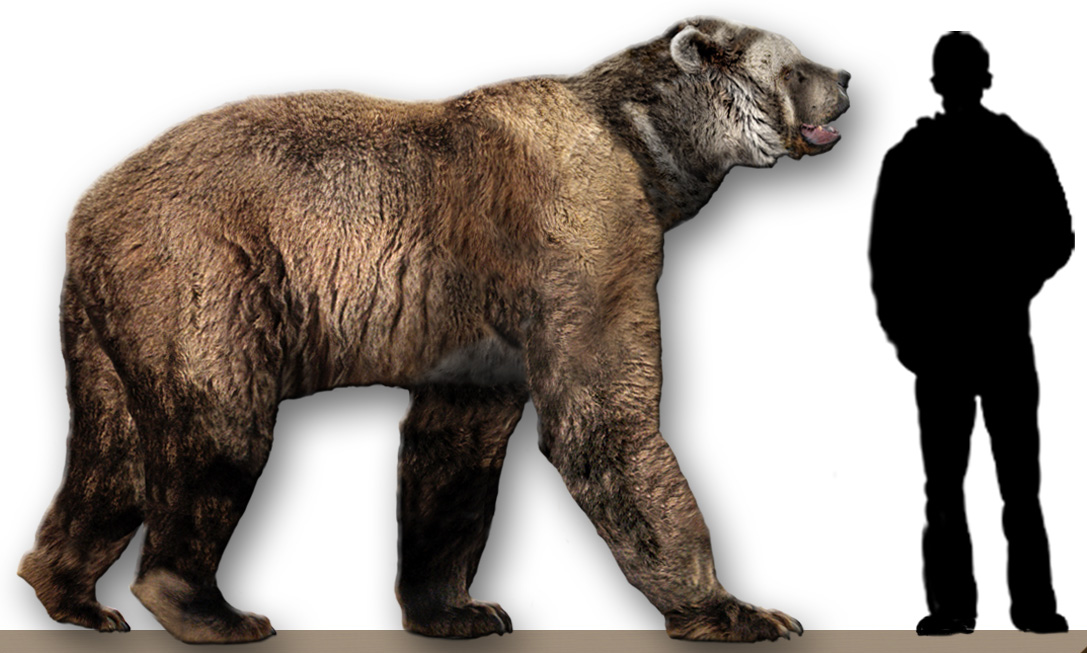
- Restoration of an Arctodus, or short-faced bear, with a human to scale
  †Arctodus
  - †Arctodus simus – type locality for species
- †Arctostaphylos
- Ardea
  - †Ardea herodias
- Arenaria
  - †Arenaria melanocephala
- Arene
  - †Arene mcleani – type locality for species
- †Argenna
  - †Argenna fossilis – type locality for species
- Argobuccinum
  - †Argobuccinum katherineae – type locality for species
  - †Argobuccinum oregonensis
- Argopecten
  - †Argopecten deserti
  - †Argopecten gibbus
  - †Argopecten mendenhalli
  - †Argopecten purpuratus
  - †Argopecten ventricosus
- †Argyrocetus – type locality for genus
  - †Argyrocetus bakersfieldensis – type locality for species
  - †Argyrocetus joaquinensis – type locality for species
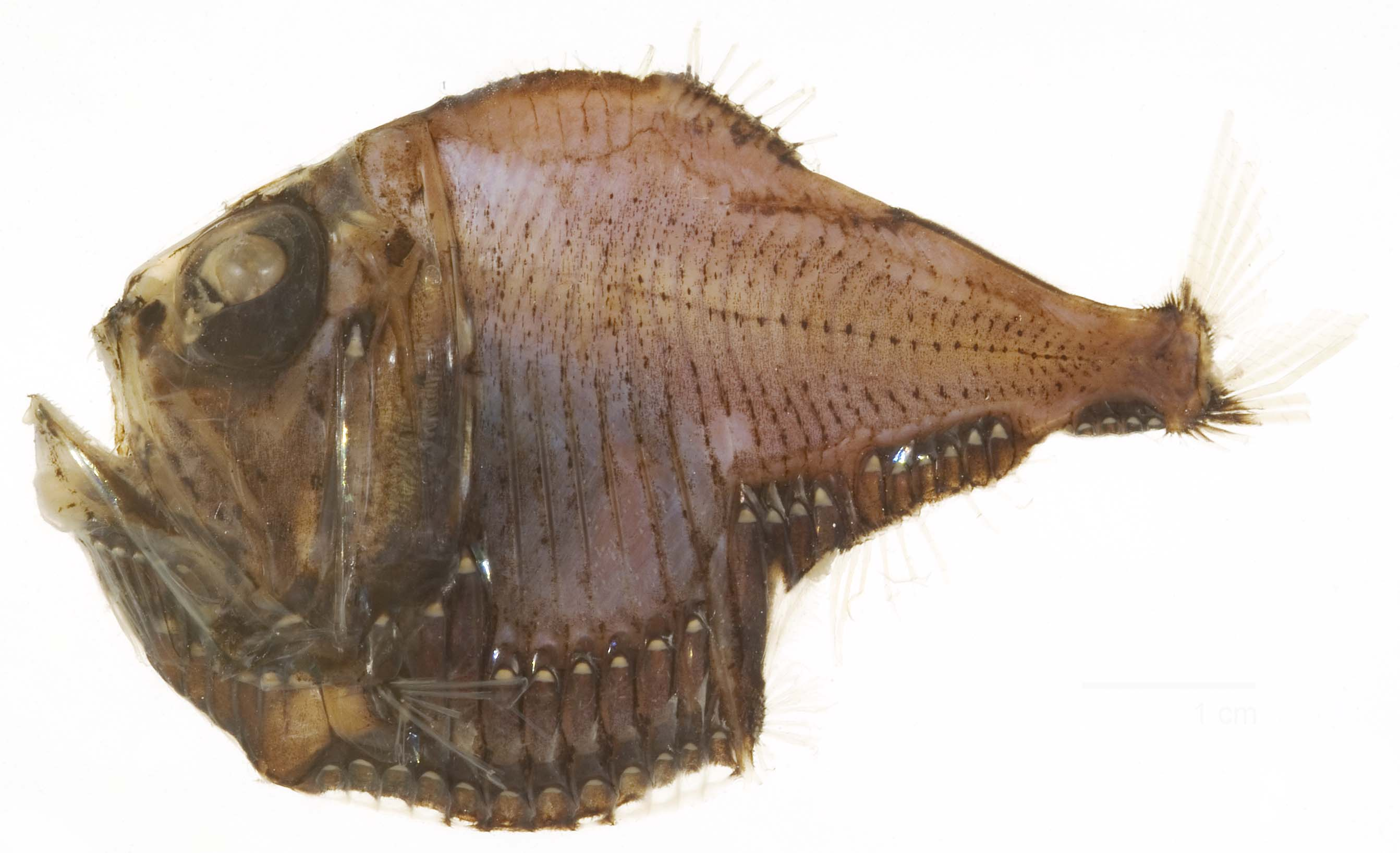
- A modern Argyropelecus silver hatchetfish
  Argyropelecus
  - †Argyropelecus bullocki – type locality for species
  - †Argyropelecus bullockii
- †Arnoldina – type locality for genus
  - †Arnoldina iniistia – type locality for species
- Arossia
- †Artocarpus
  - †Artocarpus lessigiana
- †Asclepiadites
  - †Asclepiadites laterita – type locality for species
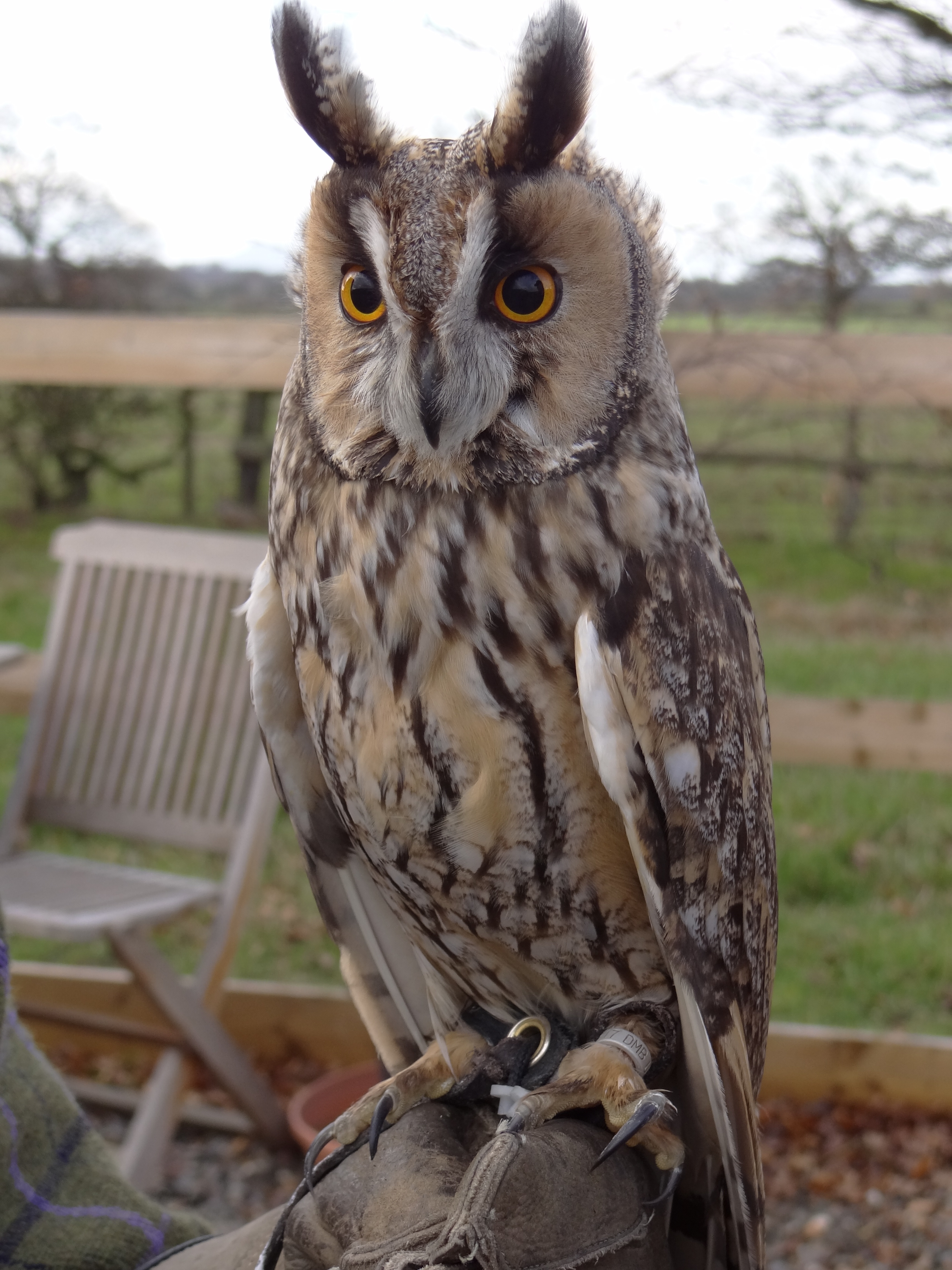
- A living Asio otus, or long-eared owl
  Asio
  - †Asio priscus
  - †Asio wilsonianus
- Asterigerina
  - †Asterigerina crassaformis
- Astraea
  - †Astraea biangulata – or unidentified comparable form
  - †Astraea gibbosa
  - †Astraea gradata
  - †Astraea morani – type locality for species
  - †Astraea undosa
- Astrangia
  - †Astrangia grandis – type locality for species
  - †Astrangia insignifica – type locality for species
- †Astrocoenia – tentative report
- †Astrocoenta
- †Astrodapsis
  - †Astrodapsis arnoldi – or unidentified comparable form
  - †Astrodapsis cuyamanus
  - †Astrodapsis fernandoensis
  - †Astrodapsis merriami – tentative report
  - †Astrodapsis spatiosus
- †Astrodaspis
  - †Astrodaspis arnoldi
- Astropecten
- Astyris
  - †Astyris gausapata
- Athene
  - †Athene cunicularia
- Athleta
  - †Athleta roddai – type locality for species
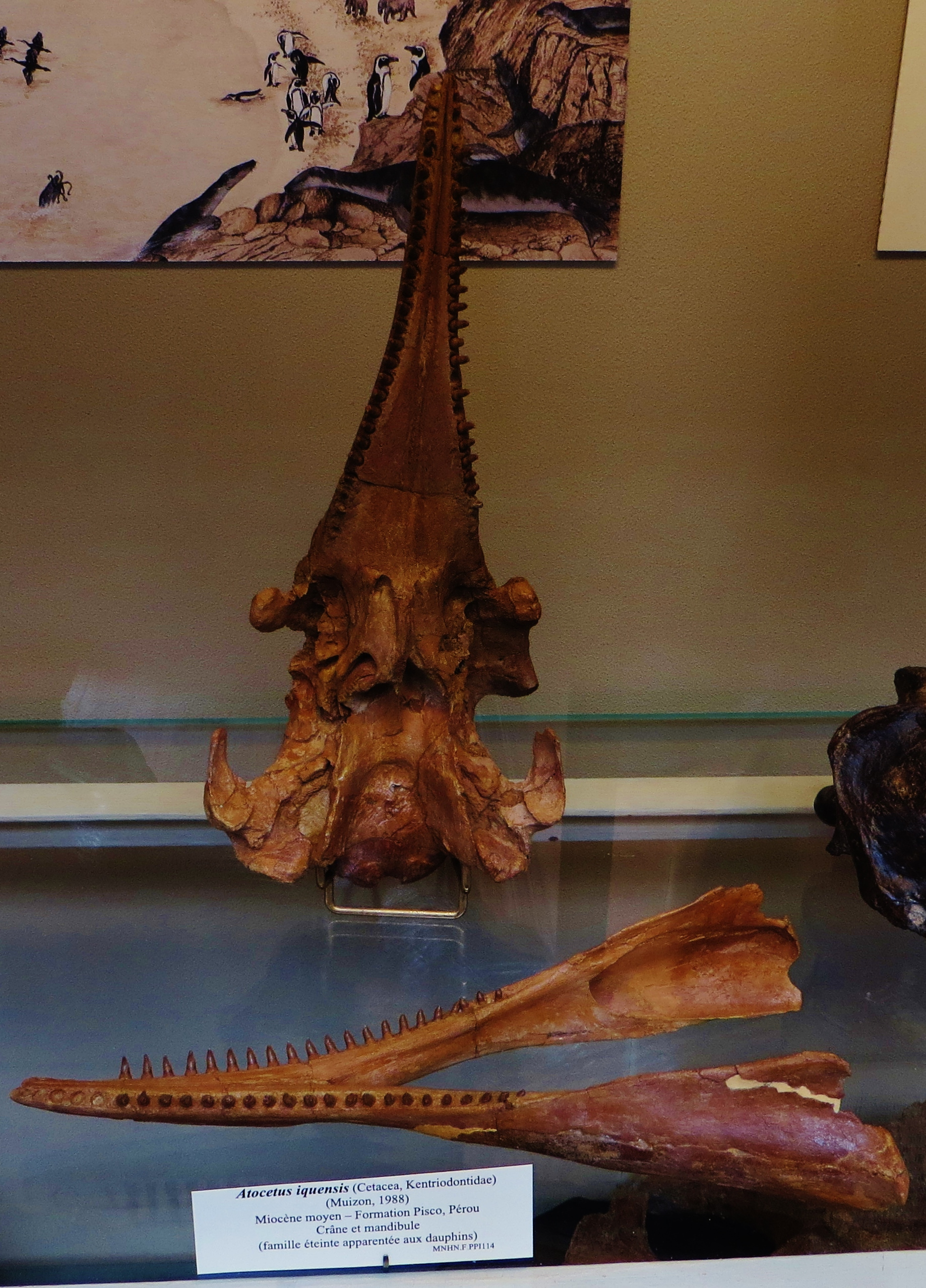
- Fossilized skull of the Miocene dolphin Atocetus
  †Atocetus
  - †Atocetus nasalis – type locality for species
- †Atopotarus – type locality for genus
  - †Atopotarus courseni – type locality for species
- Atrina
  - †Atrina alamedensis
- †Aturia
  - †Aturia angustata
  - †Aturia dickersoni – type locality for species
  - †Aturia kerniana – type locality for species
  - †Aturia myrlae – type locality for species
- †Aturoidea
  - †Aturoidea mathewsonii – type locality for species
- Atys
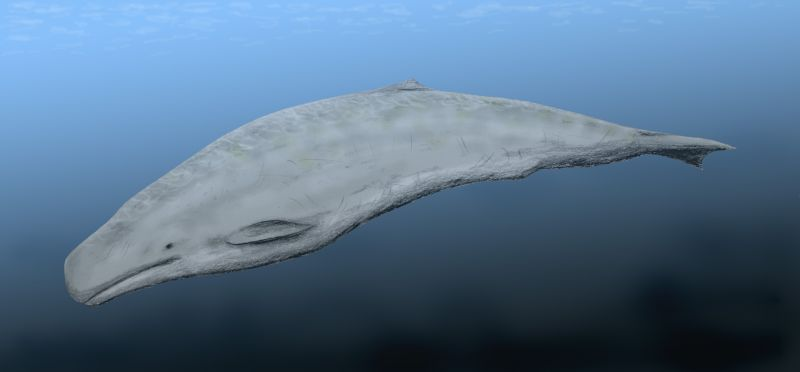
- Life restoration of the Miocene sperm whale Aulophyseter
  †Aulophyseter – type locality for genus
  - †Aulophyseter morricei – type locality for species
- Austrotrophon
- †Auxides
  - †Auxides sanctaemonicae
- †Avipeda
- Aythya
  - †Aythya affinis
  - †Aythya valisineria
- †Azalois – type locality for genus
  - †Azalois angelensis – type locality for species

== B ==
- Baiomys
  - †Baiomys mowi
- Balaenoptera
  - †Balaenoptera bertae – type locality for species
  - †Balaenoptera cortesi
  - †Balaenoptera davidsonii – type locality for species
  - †Balaenoptera physalus
  - †Balaenoptera ryani
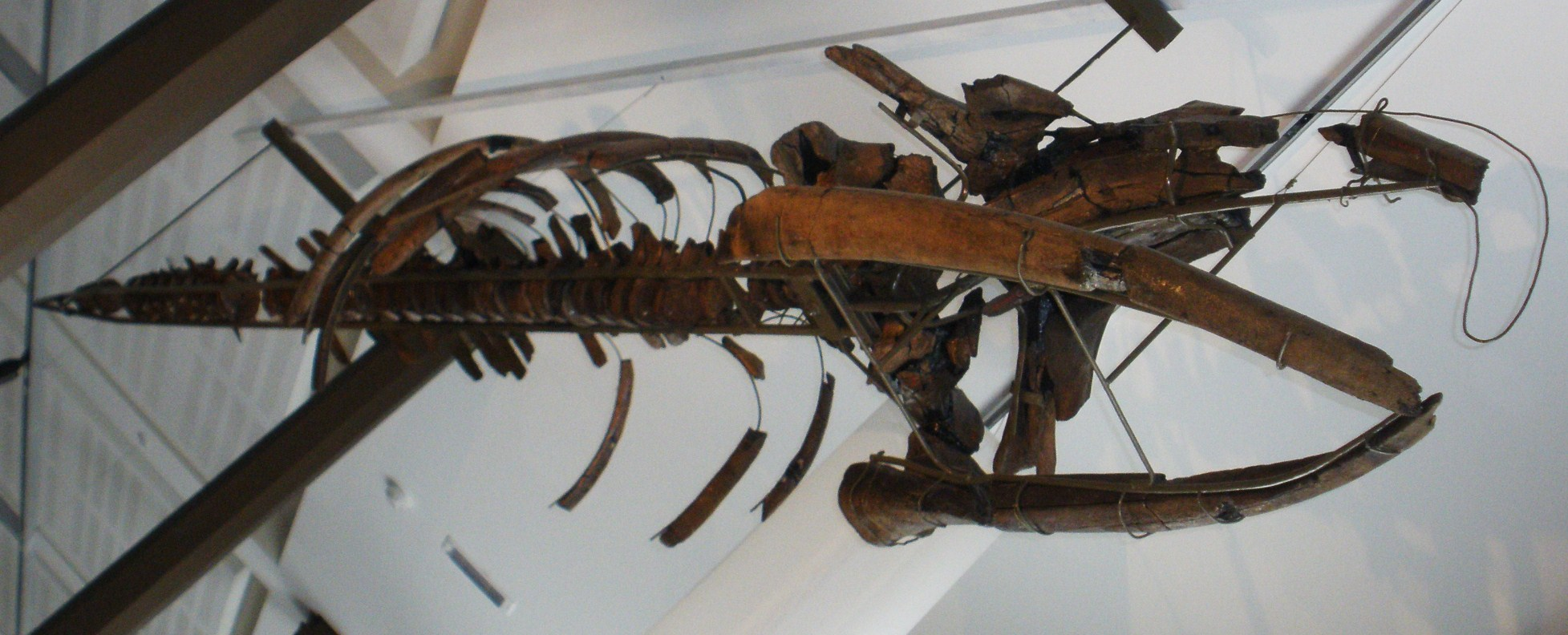
- Mounted fossilized skeleton of the Pliocene whale Balaenula
  †Balaenula
- Balanophyllia
  - †Balanophyllia elegans
  - †Balanophyllia variabilis – type locality for species
- Balanus
  - †Balanus crenatus
  - †Balanus gregarius
  - †Balanus nubilus – or unidentified comparable form
  - †Balanus rostratus
- Balcis
  - †Balcis micans
  - †Balcis monicensis
  - †Balcis oldroydi
  - †Balcis rutila
  - †Balcis thersites
- Bankia
  - †Bankia setacea – or unidentified comparable form
- Barbarofusus
  - †Barbarofusus barbarensis
- Barbatia
  - †Barbatia cliffensis
  - †Barbatia landesi – or unidentified related form
  - †Barbatia strongi – type locality for species
  - †Barbatia suzzalloi – or unidentified comparable form
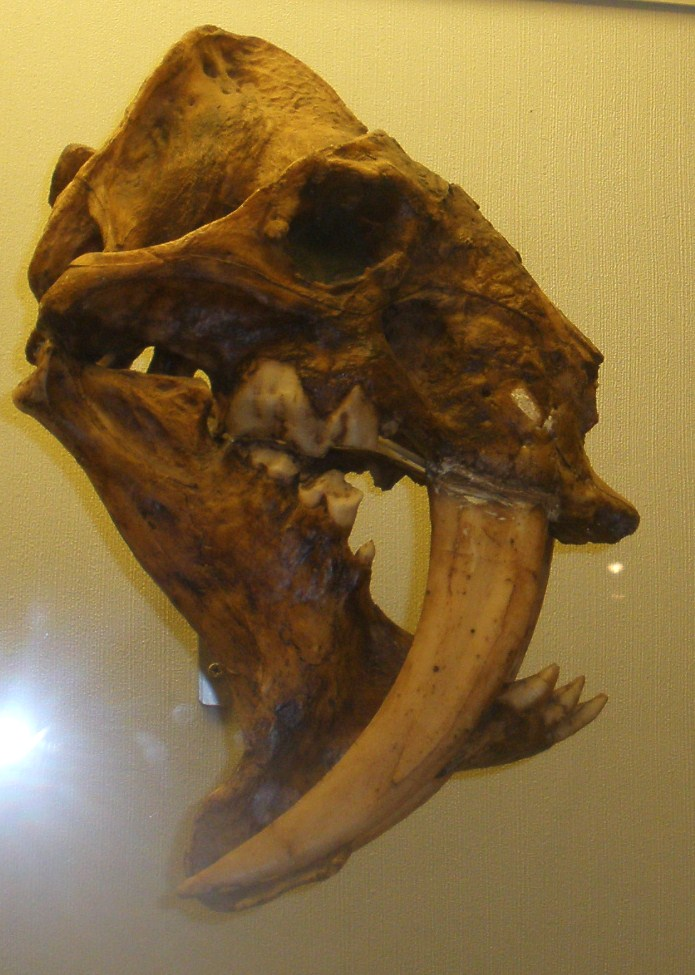
- Fossilized skull of the Miocene-Pliocene false saber-toothed cat Barbourofelis
  †Barbourofelis
  - †Barbourofelis loveorum
  - †Barbourofelis whitfordi
- Barleeia
  - †Barleeia marmorea
- Barnea
  - †Barnea costata
- †Basirepomys
  - †Basirepomys pliocenicus – type locality for species
- Bassariscus
  - †Bassariscus antiquus
  - †Bassariscus astutus – or unidentified comparable form
  - †Bassariscus casei
  - †Bassariscus raptor
- †Bathylagus – type locality for genus
  - †Bathylagus quiescens – type locality for species
  - †Bathylagus quisquilia – type locality for species
- †Bathysiphon
  - †Bathysiphon eocenica
  - †Bathysiphon sanctaecrucis
- Bathytoma
  - †Bathytoma pacifica
- †Batodonoides
  - †Batodonoides powayensis
  - †Batodonoides walshi – type locality for species
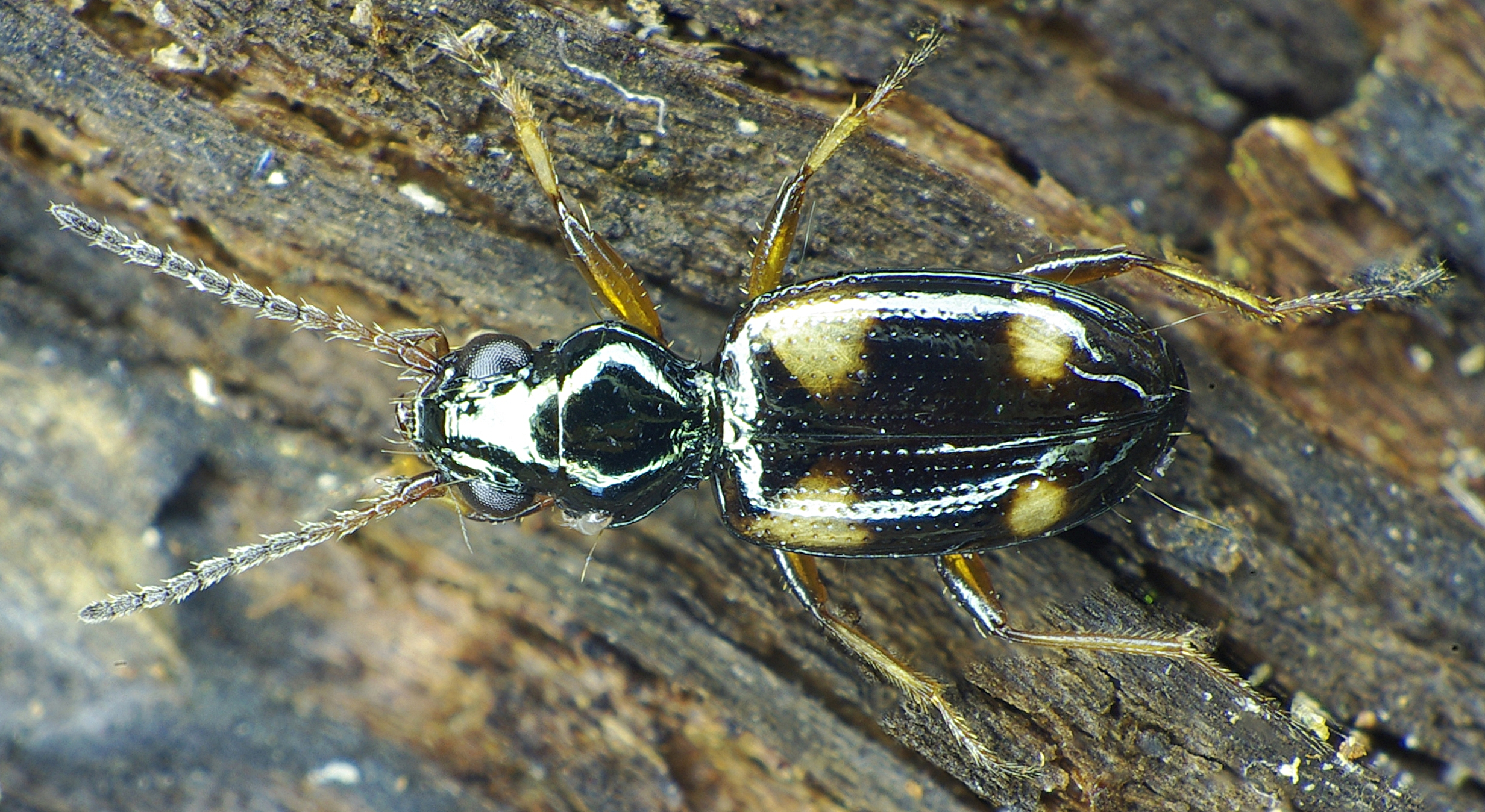
- A living Bembidion ground beetle
  Bembidion
  - †Bembidion davidae – type locality for species
  - †Bembidion everestae – type locality for species
- †Benoistia
  - †Benoistia cantonensis
- †Bensonomys
  - †Bensonomys arizonae
  - †Bensonomys gidleyi
  - †Bensonomys meadensis
- Beringraja
  - †Beringraja binoculata – or unidentified comparable form
- †Bestiopeda
- Betula
  - †Betula ashleyii
- †Bifarina
  - †Bifarina eleganta
- Bison
  - †Bison antiquus
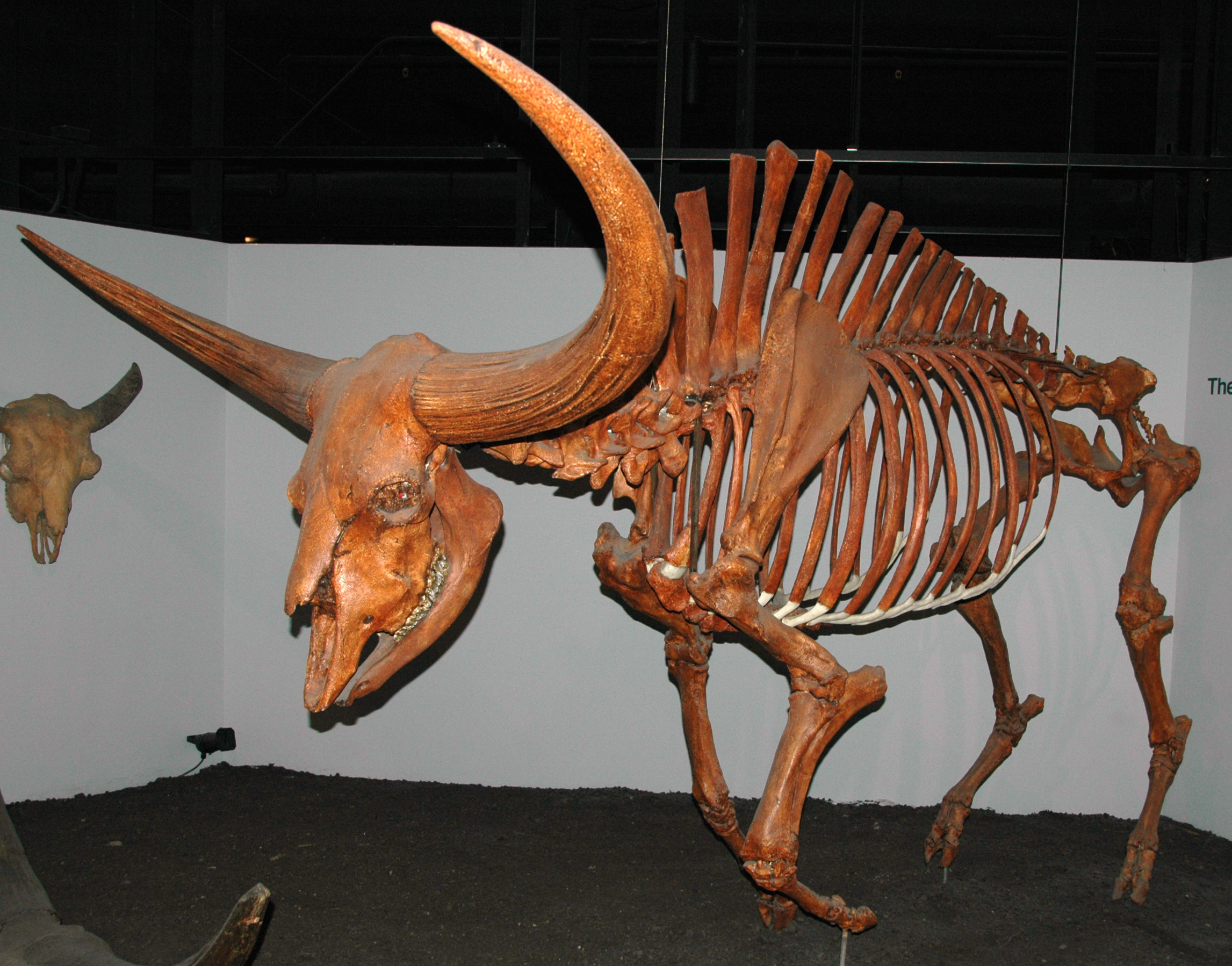
  - Mounted fossilized skeleton of the Pleistocene Bison latifrons, or long-horned bison
    †Bison latifrons
- Bittium
  - †Bittium alternatum – or unidentified comparable form
  - †Bittium asperum
  - †Bittium casmaliense
  - †Bittium catalinense
  - †Bittium dumblei
  - †Bittium eschrichti
  - †Bittium eschrichtii
  - †Bittium inerfossa
  - †Bittium interfossa
  - †Bittium latum
  - †Bittium ornatissimum
  - †Bittium rugatum
  - †Bittium topangensis
- Bivetopsia
  - †Bivetopsia bullata
- †Boavus
  - †Boavus affinis – type locality for species
- Boetica
  - †Boetica hertleini
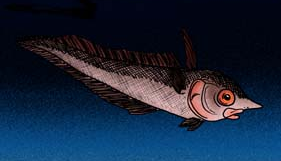
- Life restoration of the Miocene grenadier fish Bolbocara (bottom)
  †Bolbocara
  - †Bolbocara gyrinus
- Bolinichthys
- Bolivina
  - †Bolivina gracilis
- Bonasa
  - †Bonasa umbellus
- †Bonellitia
  - †Bonellitia paucivaricata
  - †Bonellitia stantoni
- Bornia
  - †Bornia retifera
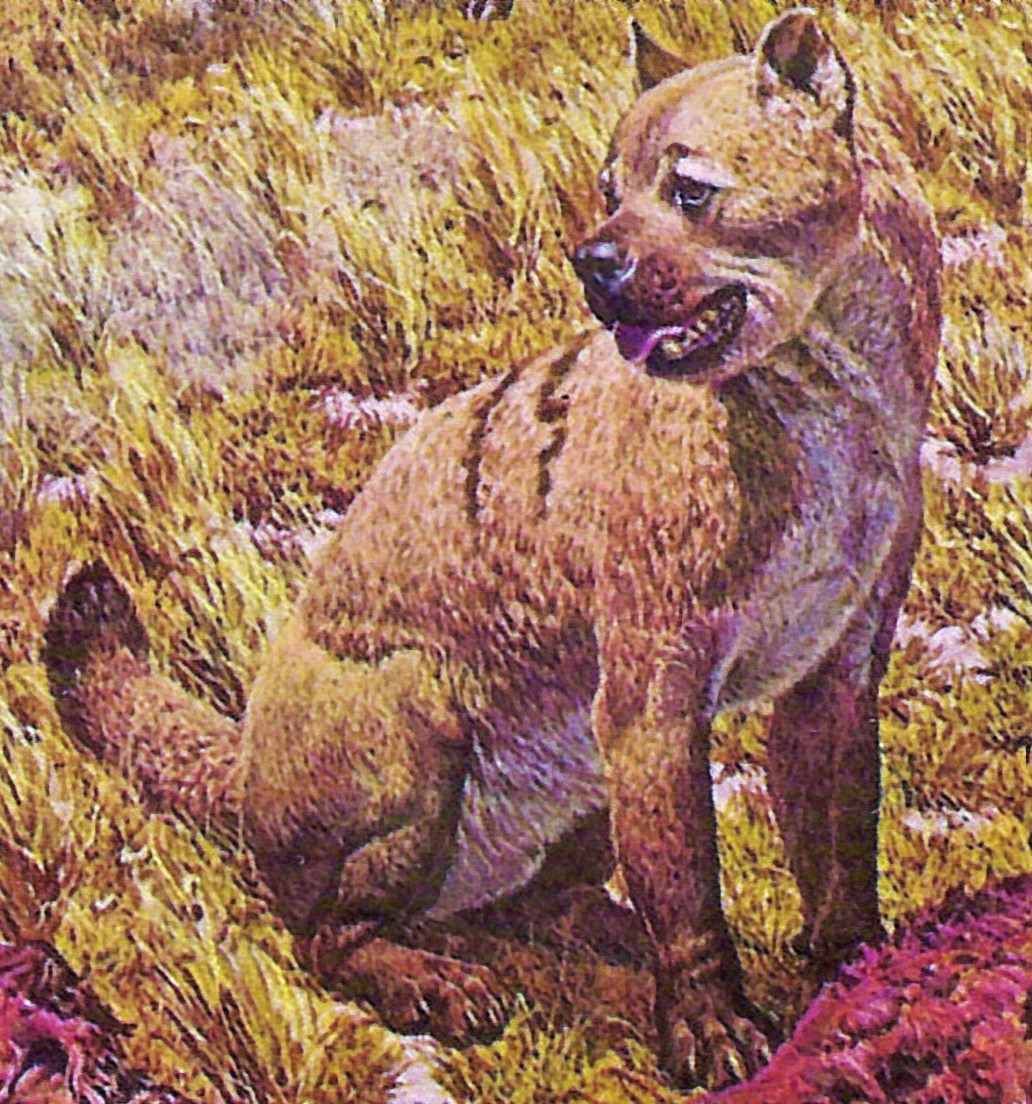
- Restoration of two of the Miocene-Pliocene bone-crushing dog genus Borophagus preying on a camel. Jay Matternes (1964).
  †Borophagus
  - †Borophagus diversidens
  - †Borophagus littoralis – type locality for species
  - †Borophagus parvus
  - †Borophagus secundus
- †Borophryne
  - †Borophryne apogon
- †Bouromeryx
  - †Bouromeryx americanus
  - †Bouromeryx submilleri – or unidentified comparable form
- Brachidontes
  - †Brachidontes cowlitzensis
  - †Brachidontes dichotomus
  - †Brachidontes lawsoni – or unidentified comparable form
  - †Brachidontes ornatus
- Brachiodontes
  - †Brachiodontes lawsoni
- †Brachisphingus
  - †Brachisphingus gabbi
- †Brachyallodesmus – type locality for genus
  - †Brachyallodesmus packardi
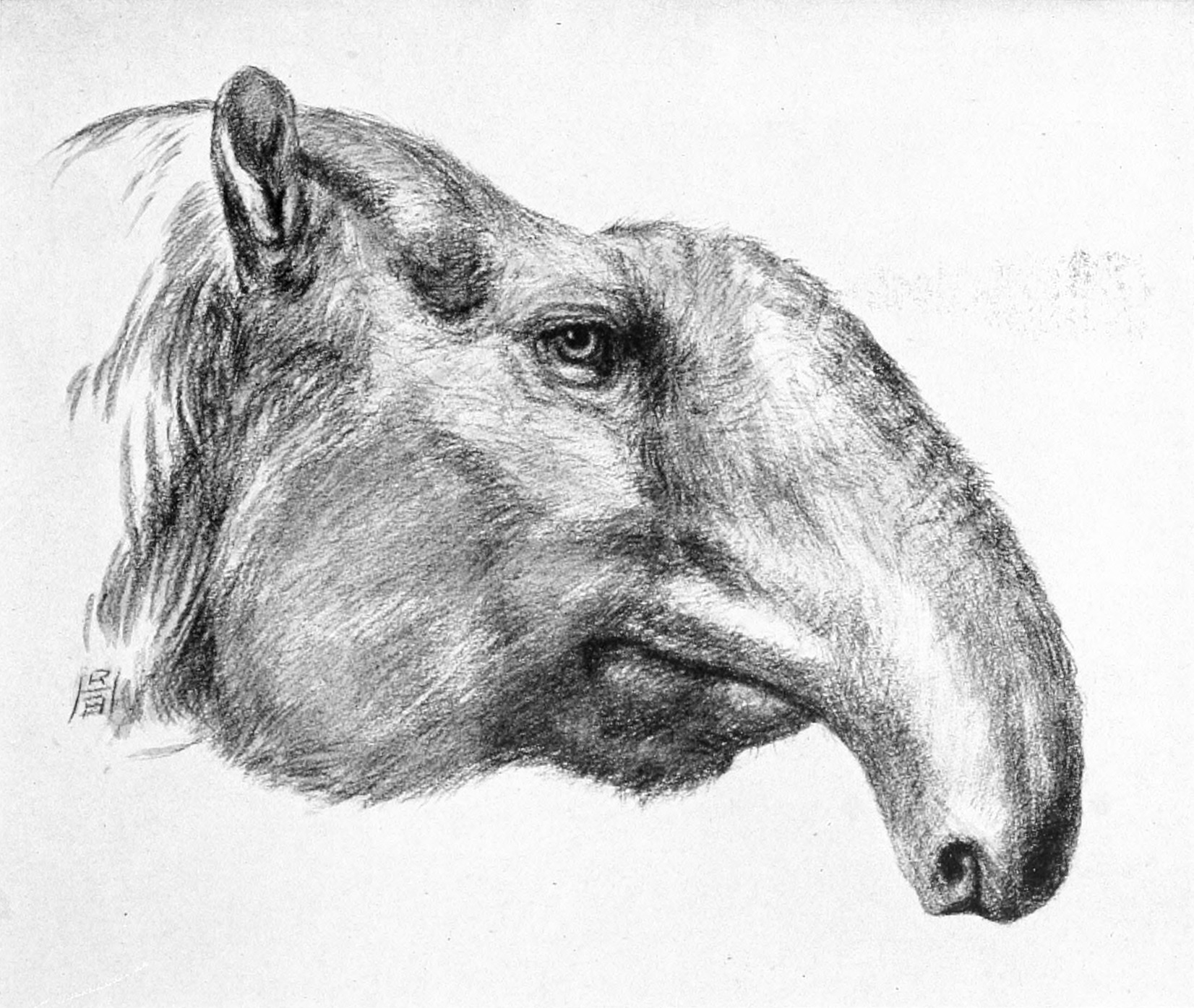
- Restorative portrait of the Miocene oreodont mammal Brachycrus
  †Brachycrus
  - †Brachycrus buwaldi
  - †Brachycrus laticeps
- †Brachyerix
  - †Brachyerix incertis
- †Brachypsalis
  - †Brachypsalis obliquidens
  - †Brachypsalis pachycephalus – or unidentified comparable form
- Brachyramphus
  - †Brachyramphus dunkeli – type locality for species
  - †Brachyramphus pliocenum – type locality for species
- †Brachysphingus
  - †Brachysphingus liratus
  - †Brachysphingus mammilatus – type locality for species
  - †Brachysphingus sinuatus
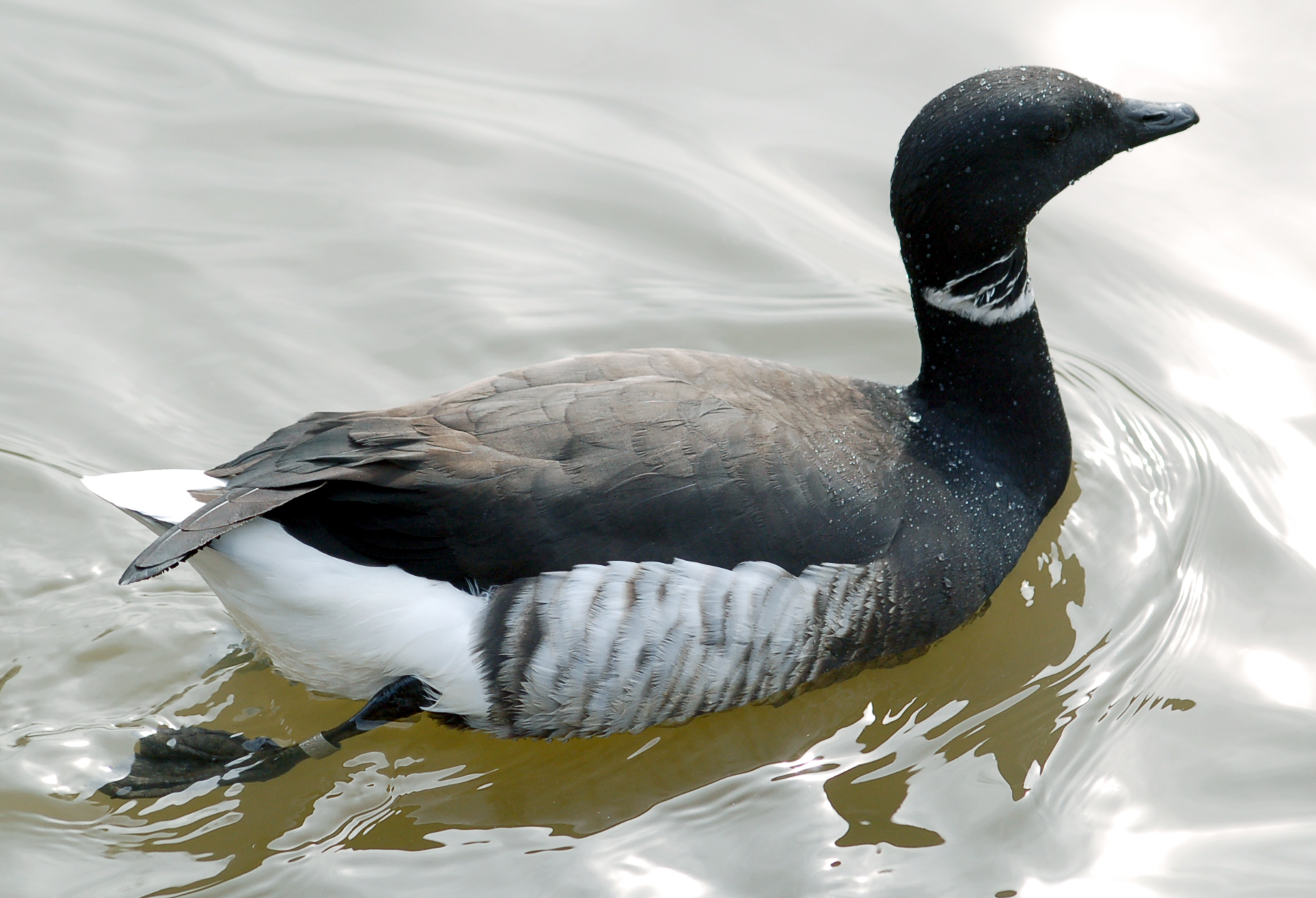
- A living Branta bernicla, or black brant
  Branta
  - †Branta canadensis
  - †Branta nigricans – tentative report
  - †Branta woolfendeni – or unidentified comparable form
- †Bretzia
- †Brevirostrodelphis – Type locality for genus
  - †Brevirostrodelphis dividum - Type locality for species (synonym Delphinodon dividum)
- †Brochopleurus – tentative report
- †Bruclarkia
  - †Bruclarkia barkerianum
  - †Bruclarkia barkerium
  - †Bruclarkia columbiana
  - †Bruclarkia gravida
  - †Bruclarkia oregonensis – or unidentified comparable form
  - †Bruclarkia santacruzana
  - †Bruclarkia seattlensis
- Bubo
  - †Bubo sinclairi – type locality for species
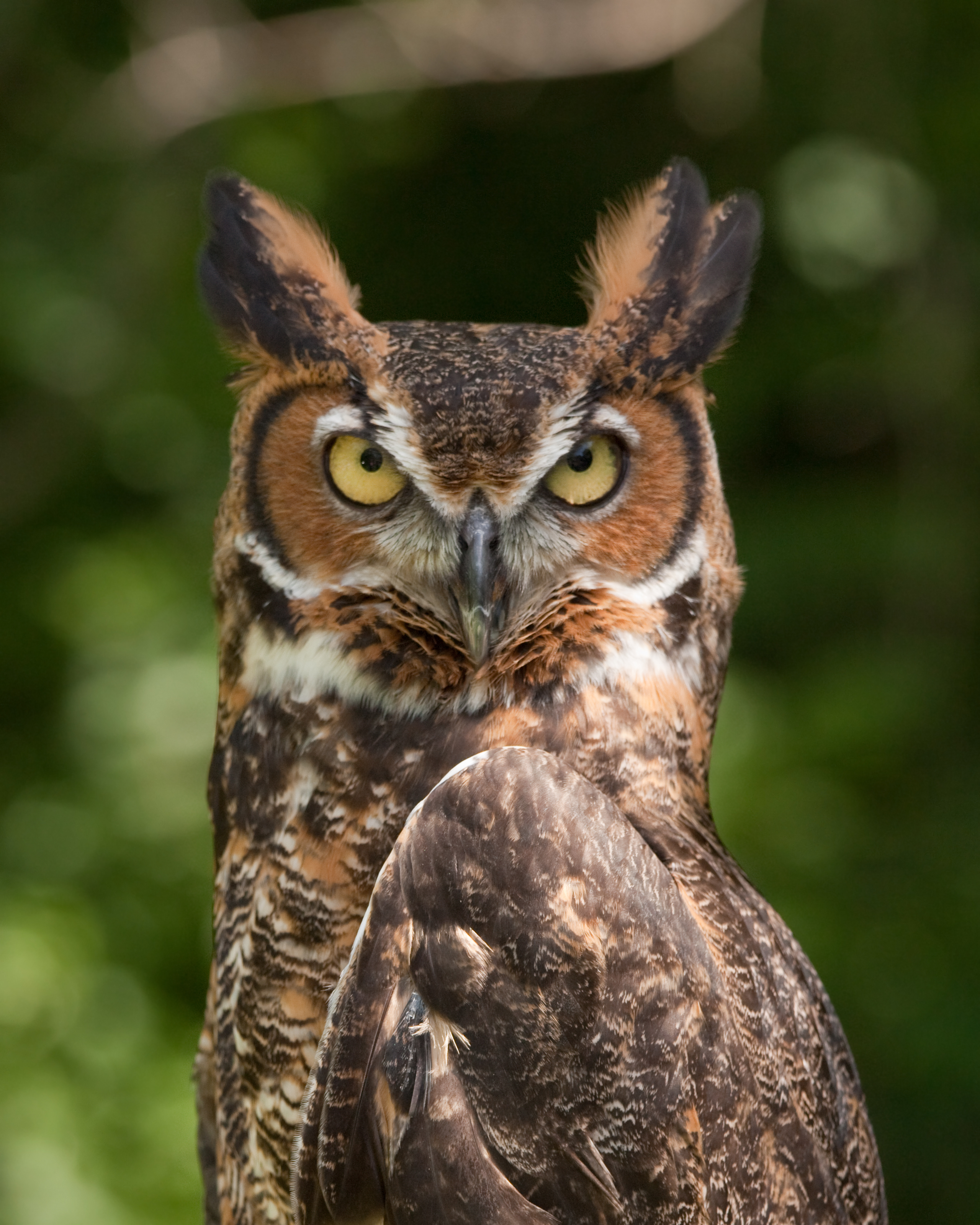
  - A living Bubo virginianus, or great horned owl
    †Bubo virginianus
- Buccinum
  - †Buccinum strigillatum
- Bucephala
  - †Bucephala albeola
- †Bucida
  - †Bucida eocenica
- Bufo
- †Bulbiceps
  - †Bulbiceps raninus
- †Bulbifusus
  - †Bulbifusus californicus – type locality for species
- Bulimina
  - †Bulimina chirana
  - †Bulimina debilis
  - †Bulimina jacksonensis
  - †Bulimina ovata
  - †Bulimina ovula
  - †Bulimina rinconensis
  - †Bulimina socialis – or unidentified comparable form
- Buliminella
  - †Buliminella curta
  - †Buliminella subfusiformis
- Bulla
  - †Bulla clarki
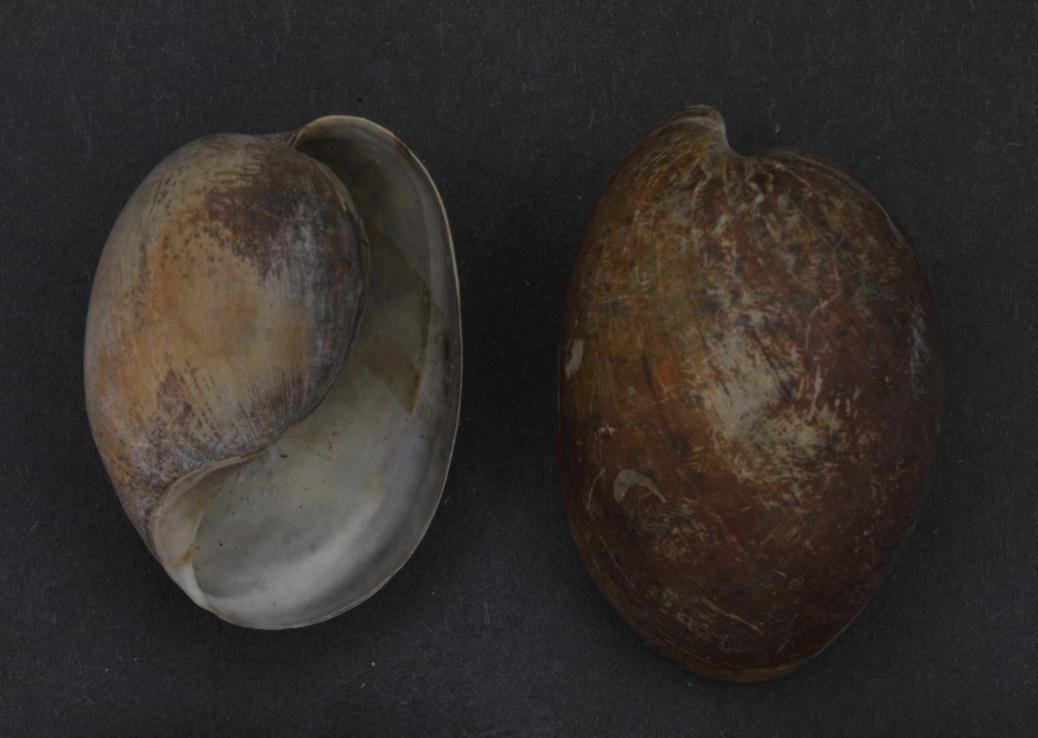
  - Shells in multiple views of Bulla gouldiana, or the California bubble sea snail
    †Bulla gouldiana
  - †Bulla punctulata – or unidentified comparable form
  - †Bulla punctulatus
  - †Bulla striata
- Bullia
  - †Bullia clarki
- †Bullinula
  - †Bullinula subglobosa
- †Bumelia
  - †Bumelia florissanti
- Bursa
  - †Bursa califomica
- Buteo
  - †Buteo borealis
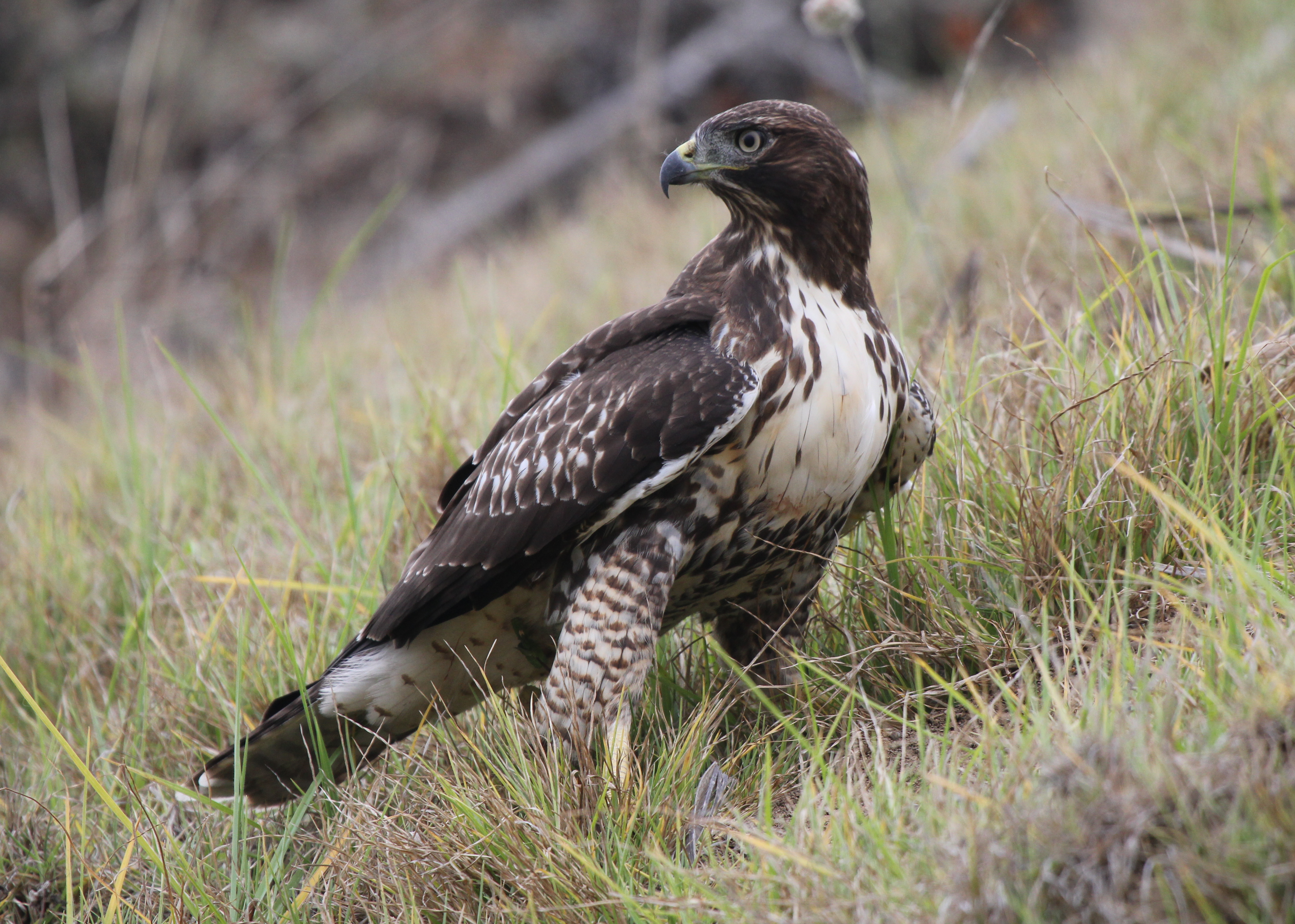
  - A living Buteo jamaicensis, or red-tailed hawk
    †Buteo jamaicensis
  - †Buteo swainsoni

== C ==
- Cadulus
  - †Cadulus fusiformis
- Caecum
  - †Caecum californicum
- Calicantharus
  - †Calicantharus dalli
  - †Calicantharus fortis
  - †Calicantharus humerosus
  - †Calicantharus portolaensis – or unidentified comparable form
- †Calicovatellus – type locality for genus
  - †Calicovatellus petrodytes – type locality for species
- Calidris
  - †Calidris alba
- Californiconus
  - †Californiconus californicus
- †Calilampas
  - †Calilampas californiensis
- †Calipepla
  - †Calipepla californica
- Calliostoma
  - †Calliostoma annulata
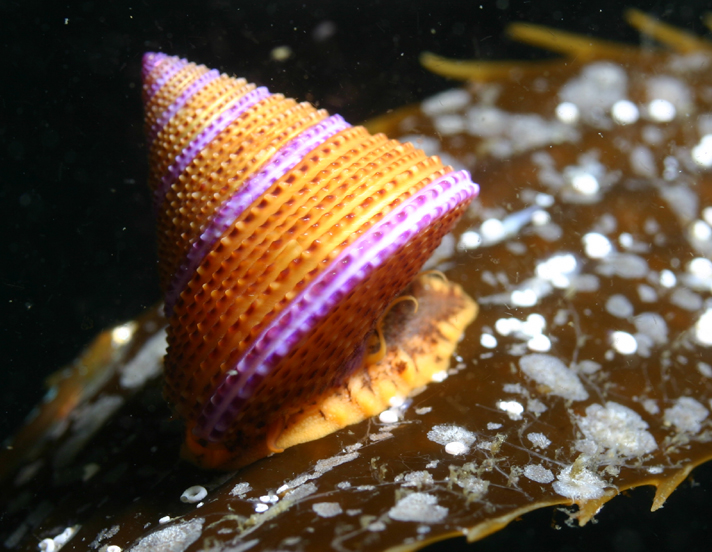
  - A living Calliostoma annulatum, or purple-ring top sea snail
    †Calliostoma annulatum
  - †Calliostoma augustinensis
  - †Calliostoma canaliculatum
  - †Calliostoma costatum
  - †Calliostoma crassicostatus
  - †Calliostoma doliarium
  - †Calliostoma doliarum – tentative report
  - †Calliostoma gemmulatum
  - †Calliostoma ligatum
  - †Calliostoma nuttalli
  - †Calliostoma supragranosum
  - †Calliostoma tricolor
- Callista
  - †Callista domenginica
  - †Callista vokesi
- Callistochiton
  - †Callistochiton palmulatus
- Callithaca
  - †Callithaca tenerrima
- Callorhinus
  - †Callorhinus gilmorei – type locality for species
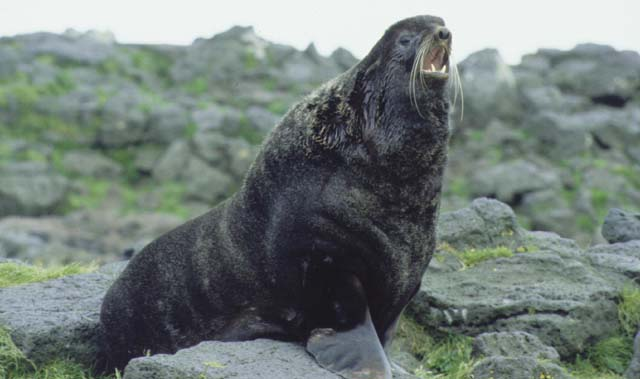
  - A living Callorhinus ursinus, or northern fur seal
    †Callorhinus ursinus
- Calopsectra
- †Calorebama
  - †Calorebama inornata
- †Calorhadia – tentative report
- Calosoma
  - †Calosoma semilaeve
- †Calycites
  - †Calycites mikanoides
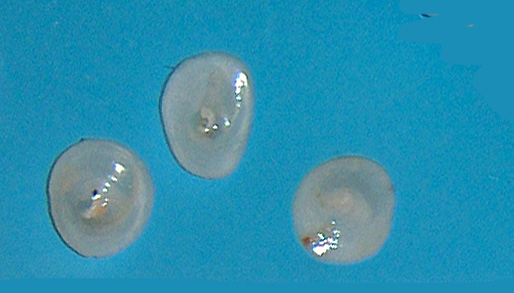
- Three modern shells of Calyptraea, or Chinese hat snails
  Calyptraea
  - †Calyptraea calabasasensis
  - †Calyptraea contorta
  - †Calyptraea costellata
  - †Calyptraea dalliana
  - †Calyptraea diegoana
  - †Calyptraea excentrica
  - †Calyptraea fastigiata
  - †Calyptraea filosa
  - †Calyptraea inornata
  - †Calyptraea mamillaris
  - †Calyptraea mammilaris – or unidentified comparable form
- †Calyptranthes
  - †Calyptranthes myrtifolia – type locality for species
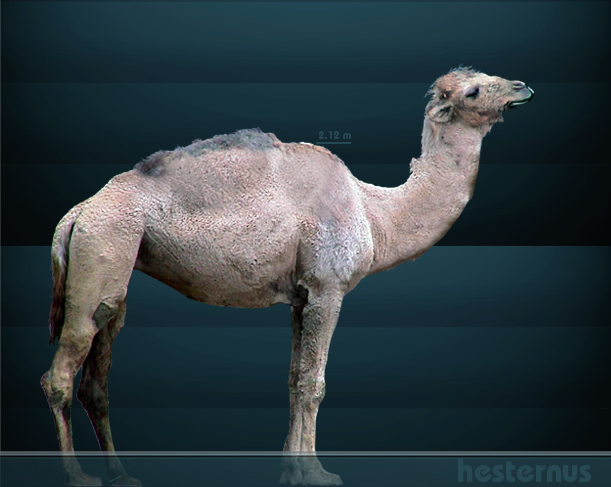
- Life restoration of the Pliocene-Holocene camel Camelops
  †Camelops
  - †Camelops hesternus
  - †Camelops minidokae
- †Cammackacetus – Type locality for genus
  - †Cammackacetus hazenorum - Type locality for species
- Campanile
  - †Campanile dilloni
- Camponotus – type locality for genus
  - †Camponotus festinatus – type locality for species
- †Canarium
  - †Canarium californicum
- Cancellaria
  - †Cancellaria arnoldi
  - †Cancellaria dalliana
  - †Cancellaria fernandoensis
  - †Cancellaria obesa
  - †Cancellaria planospira
  - †Cancellaria posunculensis
  - †Cancellaria subtuberosa
  - †Cancellaria tritonidea
- Cancer
- Cancris
  - †Cancris mexicanus
- Canis
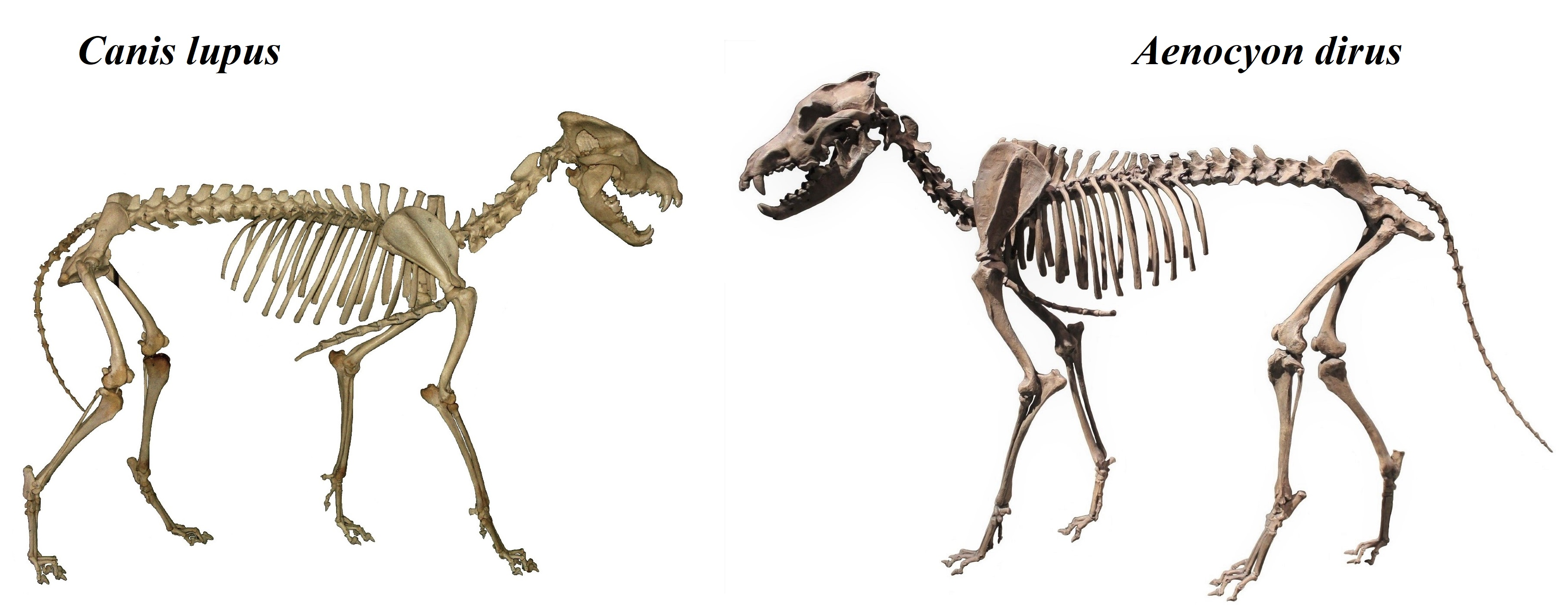
  - Modern mounted skeleton of Canis lupus, the grey wolf, to scale with a fossilized skeleton of the Pleistocene wolf Canis dirus, or dire wolf
    †Canis dirus
  - †Canis edwardii
  - †Canis latrans
  - †Canis lepophagus
  - †Canis lupus
  - †Canis rufus
- Canthon
  - †Canthon praticola
  - †Canthon simplex
- †Cantius
  - †Cantius actius
- †Capricamelus – type locality for genus
  - †Capricamelus gettyi – type locality for species
- †Capromeryx
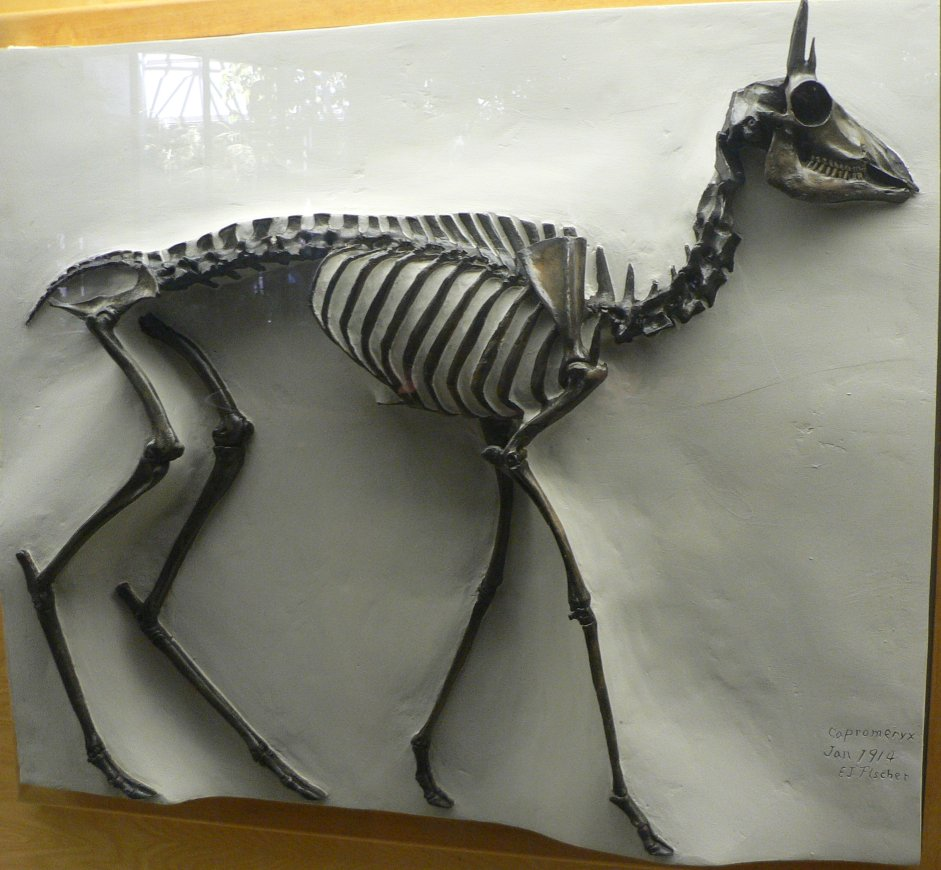
  - Fossilized skeleton of the Pleistocene dwarf pronghorn Capromeryx
    †Capromeryx minor
- Caracara
  - †Caracara cheriway
  - †Caracara plancus
- Carcharhinus
- Carcharias
  - †Carcharias clavatus
- †Carcharinus
- Carcharodon
  - †Carcharodon arnoldi
  - †Carcharodon carcharias
  - †Carcharodon hastalis
  - †Carcharodon leviathan
  - †Carcharodon morricei
  - †Carcharodon sulcidens
  - †Carcharodon tembloris – type locality for species
- Cardium
  - †Cardium brewerii, alternative of Acanthocardia brewerii (see List of the Cenozoic life of California § A)
- Carpelimus
- †Carpites
  - †Carpites egregia
- †Carpocyon
  - †Carpocyon robustus
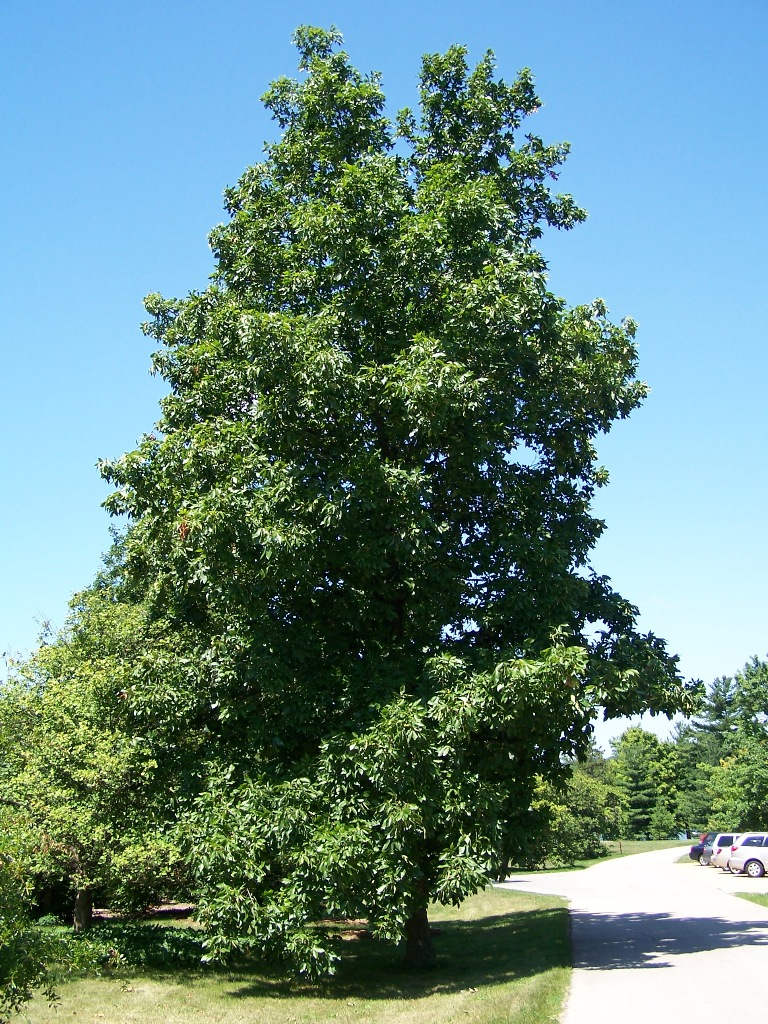
- A living Carya, or hickory tree
  Carya
  - †Carya bendirei
  - †Carya sessilis
- Caryophyllia
  - †Caryophyllia arnoldi
  - †Caryophyllia californica – type locality for species
  - †Caryophyllia capayensis – type locality for species
  - †Caryophyllia pedroensis – type locality for species
- Cassidulina
  - †Cassidulina crassipunctata
  - †Cassidulina diversa – or unidentified comparable form
  - †Cassidulina globosa
- Castanea
  - †Castanea spokanensis
- Castanopsis
  - †Castanopsis longipetiolatum
- Castor
  - †Castor californicus – or unidentified comparable form
- †Catharista
  - †Catharista shastensis – type locality for species
- Cathartes
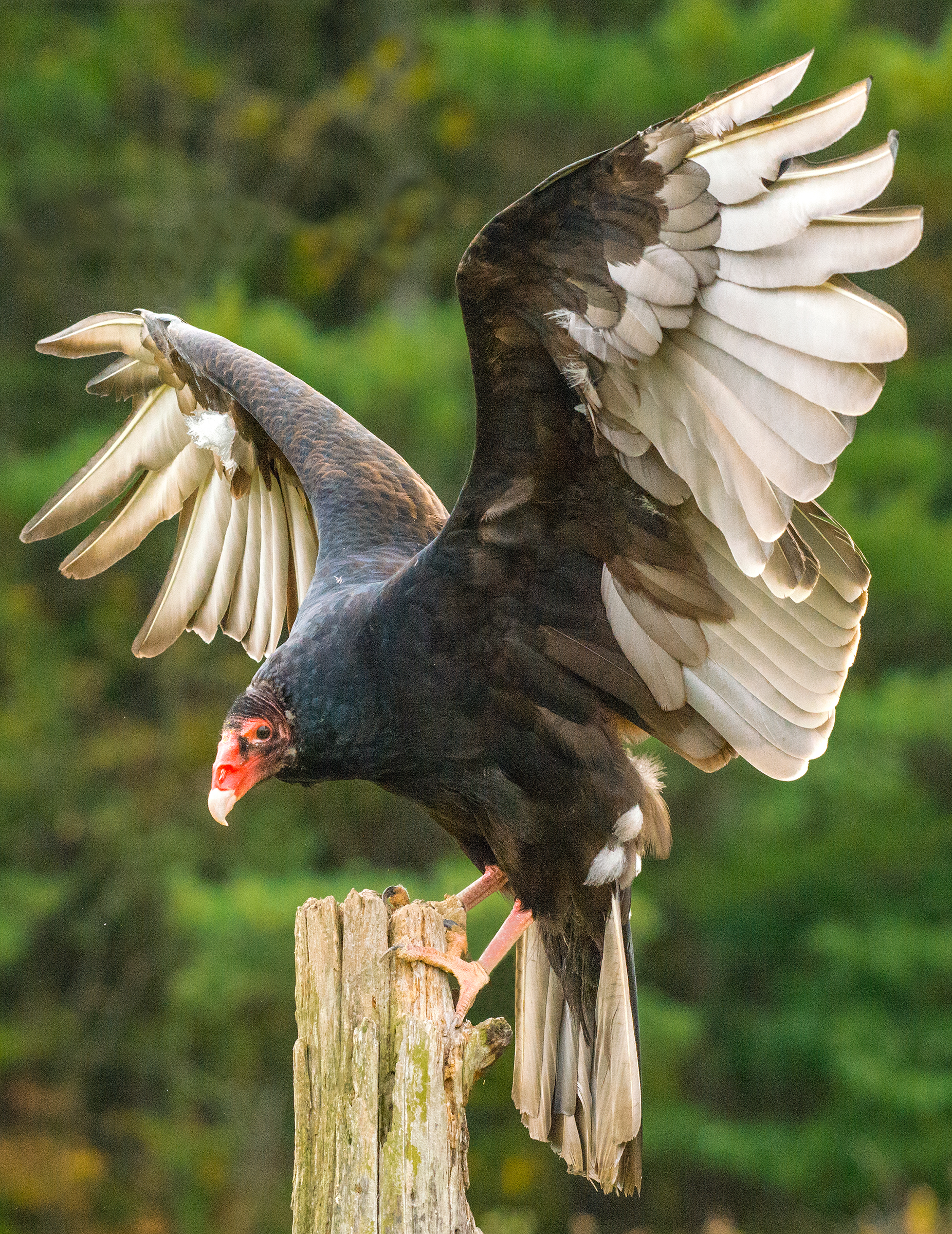
  - A living Cathartes aura, or turkey vulture
    †Cathartes aura
- Catoptrophorus
  - †Catoptrophorus semipalmatus
- †Catoptrophus
  - †Catoptrophus inornatus
- †Catostomus
  - †Catostomus occidentalis
- Ceanothus
  - †Ceanothus tuolumnensis
  - †Ceanothus turlockensis
- Cedrela
  - †Cedrela eolancifolia – type locality for species
  - †Cedrela trainii
- †Celastrus
  - †Celastrus preangulata – type locality for species
- Celtis
  - †Celtis kansana
- †Centetodon
  - †Centetodon aztecus
  - †Centetodon bembicophagus – or unidentified comparable form
  - †Centetodon magnus – or unidentified comparable form
- Centrifuga
  - †Centrifuga leeana
- Cepphus
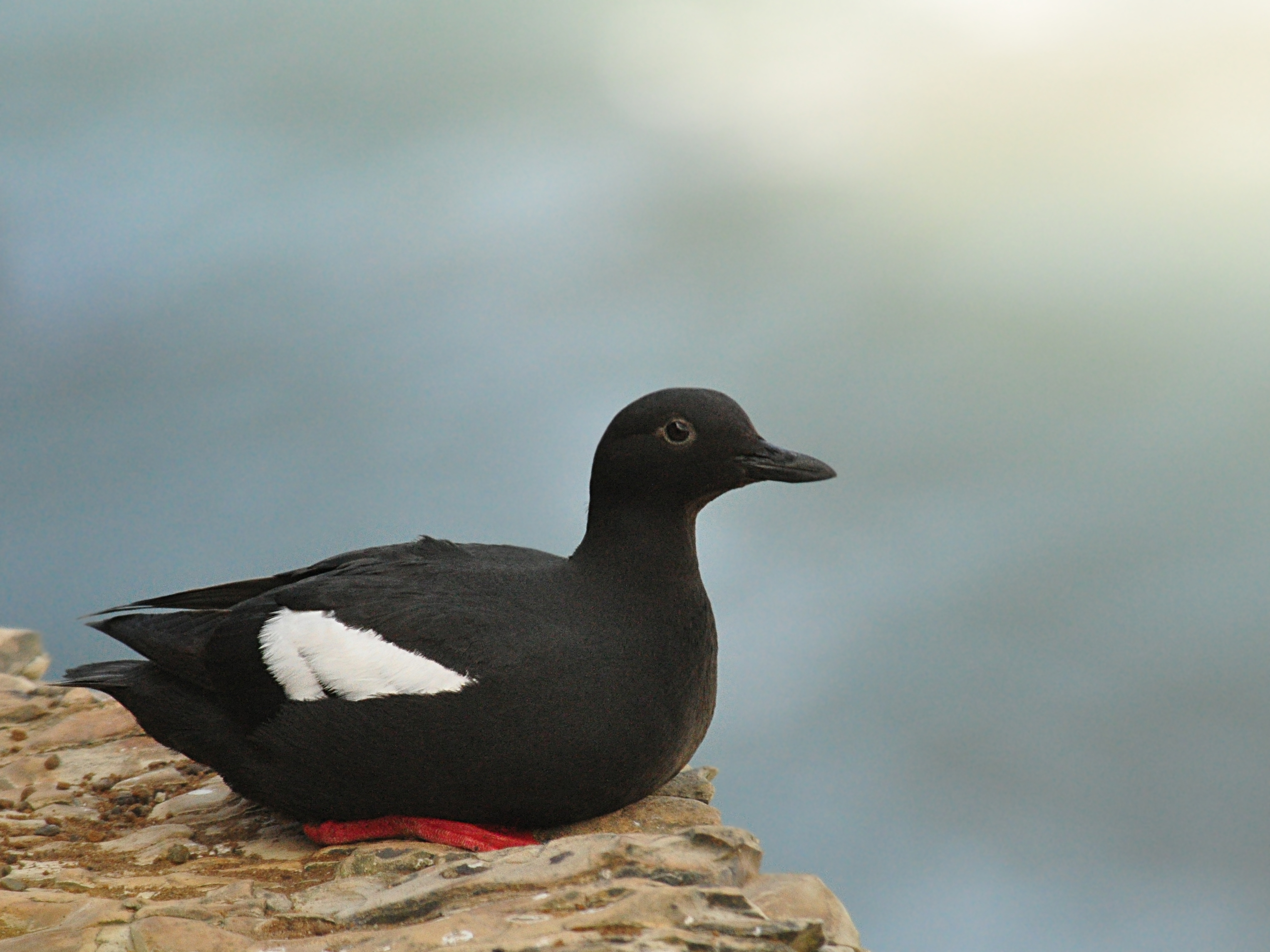
  - A living Cepphus columba, or pigeon guillemot
    †Cepphus columba
  - †Cepphus olsoni – type locality for species
- Cercidiphyllum
  - †Cercidiphyllum elongatum
- †Cercocarpus
  - †Cercocarpus nevadensis
- Cerithidea
  - †Cerithidea californica
- Cerithiopsis
  - †Cerithiopsis antefilosa
  - †Cerithiopsis carpenteri
  - †Cerithiopsis columna – or unidentified comparable form
  - †Cerithiopsis cosmia
  - †Cerithiopsis halia – or unidentified related form
  - †Cerithiopsis paramoea
  - †Cerithiopsis pedroana
  - †Cerithiopsis rowelli
  - †Cerithiopsis stejnegeri – or unidentified comparable form
- Cerithium
  - †Cerithium incisum
  - †Cerithium topangensis
- †Cernictis
  - †Cernictis hesperus – type locality for species
- †Cernina
  - †Cernina hannibali
- †Cerorhinca
  - †Cerorhinca dubia – type locality for species
  - †Cerorhinca reai – type locality for species
- Cervus
  - †Cervus elaphus
- Cetorhinus
  - †Cetorhinus maximus
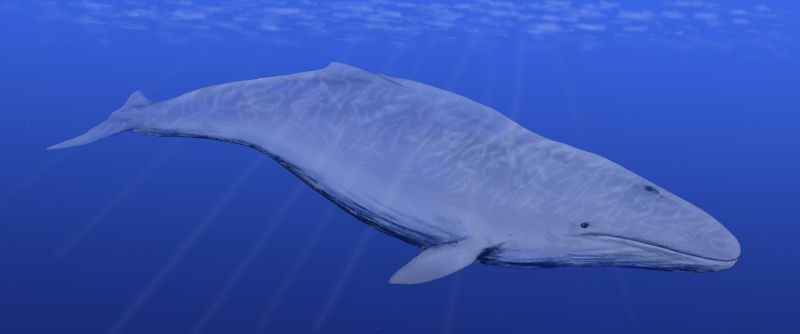
- Life restoration of the Miocene-Pliocene whale Cetotherium
  †Cetotherium
  - †Cetotherium furlongi – type locality for species
- †Chaceia
  - †Chaceia fulcherae – type locality for species
- †Chaenophryne
  - †Chaenophryne melanorhabdus
- Chaetodipus
  - †Chaetodipus formosus – or unidentified comparable form
- †Chaetoptelea
  - †Chaetoptelea pseudofulva
- †Chalcidichthys – type locality for genus
  - †Chalcidichthys malacopterygius – type locality for species
- Chama
  - †Chama arcana
  - †Chama frondosa
  - †Chama grunski
- †Chamaecyparis
  - †Chamaecyparis cordillerae
- Charadrius
  - †Charadrius semipalmatus
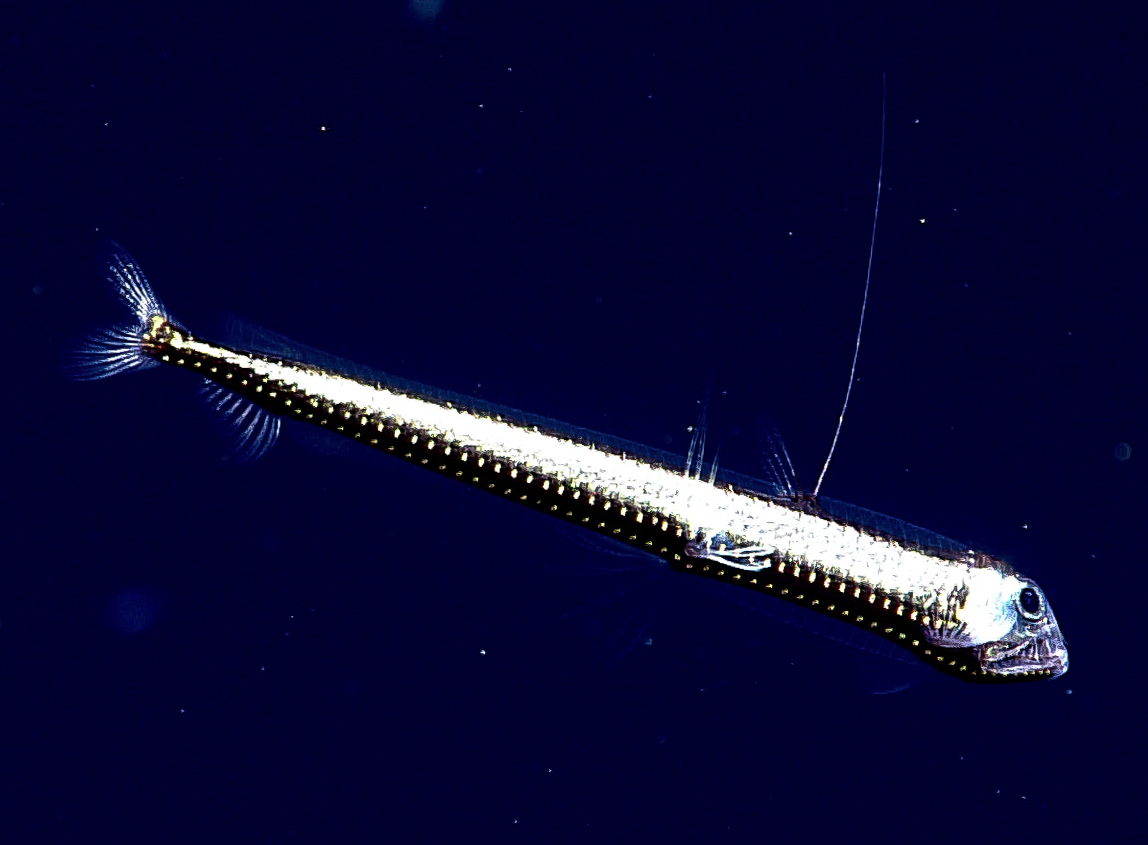
- Side profile of a Chauliodus, or viperfish
  Chauliodus – type locality for genus
  - †Chauliodus eximias
  - †Chauliodus eximius – type locality for species
- †Chedevillia
  - †Chedevillia saltonensis – type locality for species
  - †Chedevillia stewarti – type locality for species
- Chelonia
  - †Chelonia californiensis – type locality for species
- Chen
  - †Chen caerulescens
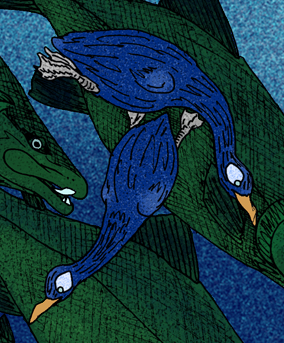
- Life restoration of the Pleistocene-Holocene Chendytes, or Law's diving-goose
  †Chendytes – type locality for genus
  - †Chendytes lawi – type locality for species
- Chilostomella
  - †Chilostomella hadleyi
- †Chilostomelloides
  - †Chilostomelloides ovicula
  - †Chilostomelloides oviformis
- Chione
  - †Chione californiensis
  - †Chione cryptolineata – or unidentified comparable form
  - †Chione latilaminosa
  - †Chione lineolata – or unidentified comparable form
  - †Chione panzana
  - †Chione schencki
  - †Chione securis
  - †Chione undatella
- Chionista
  - †Chionista fluctifraga
- Chionopsis
  - †Chionopsis gnidia
  - †Chionopsis richthofeni
  - †Chionopsis temblorensis
- Chlamys
  - †Chlamys bartschi
  - †Chlamys branneri – or unidentified comparable form
  - †Chlamys corteziana – or unidentified comparable form
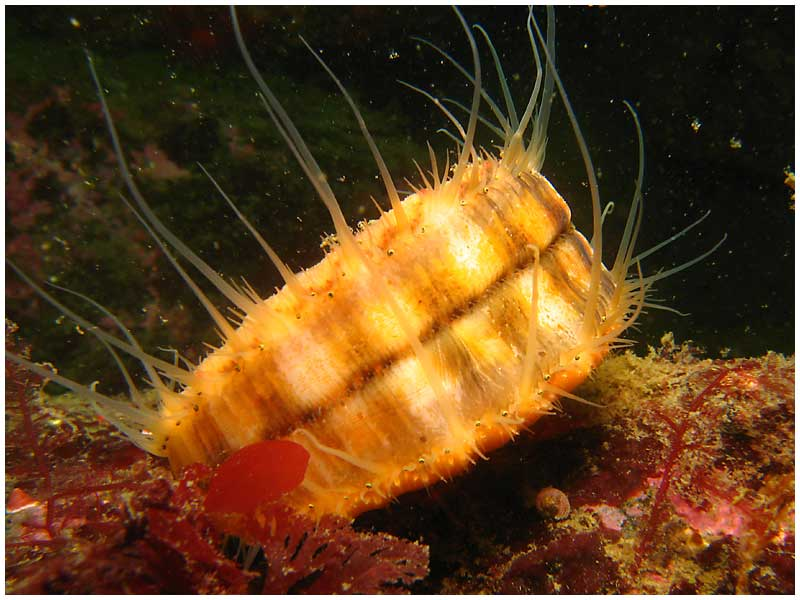
  - A living Chlamys hastata, or spear scallop
    †Chlamys hastata
  - †Chlamys hertleini
  - †Chlamys mediacostatus – type locality for species
  - †Chlamys rubida
  - †Chlamys sespeensis
  - †Chlamys swifti
- Chlorostoma
  - †Chlorostoma gallina
- †Chorizanthe
- †Chrisodomus
- †Chrysobalanus
  - †Chrysobalanus eoicaco
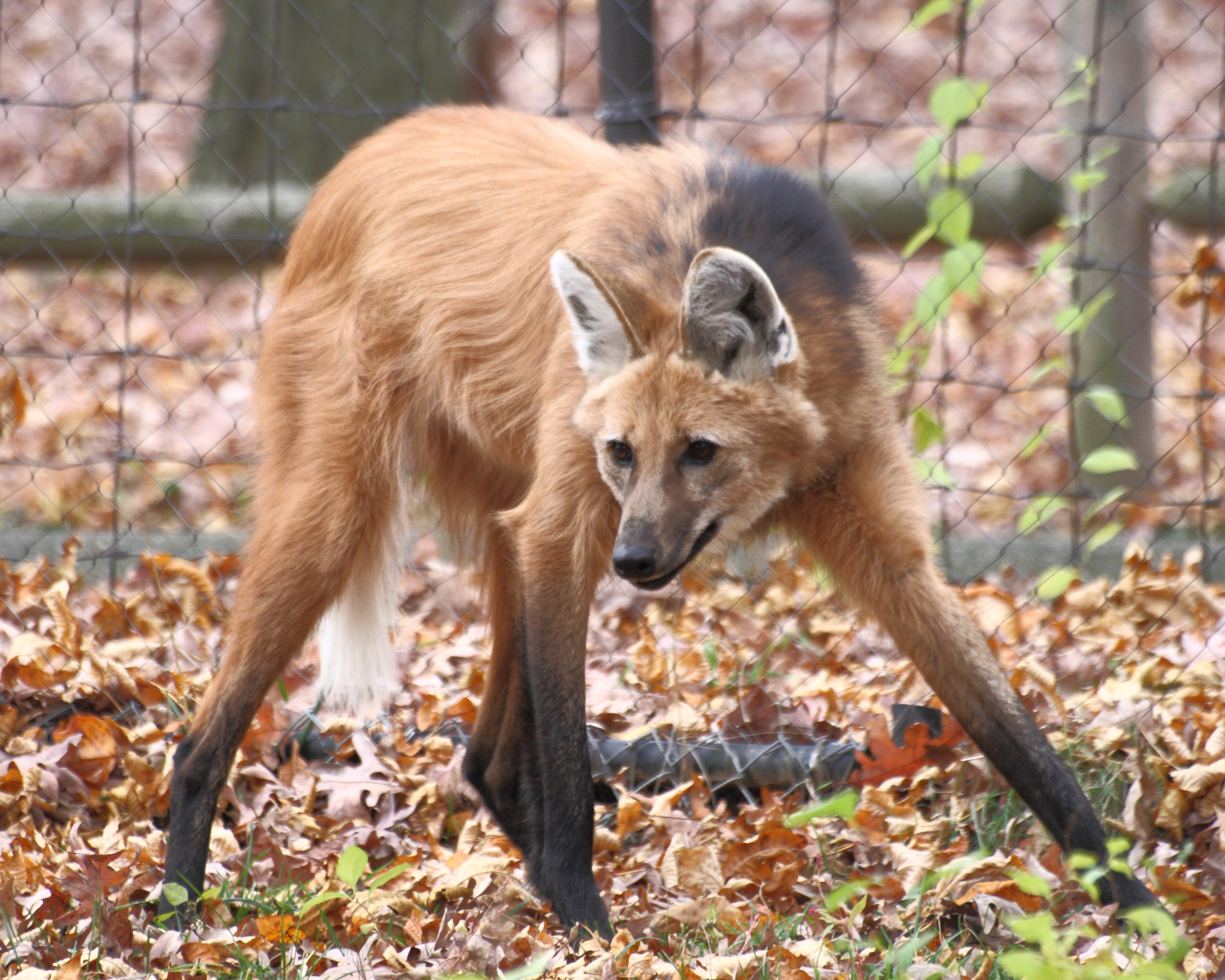
- A living Chrysocyon brachyurus, or maned wolf
  †Chrysocyon
  - †Chrysocyon nearcticus
- †Chrysodomus – report made of unidentified related form or using admittedly obsolete nomenclature
  - †Chrysodomus martini
- †Chrysolepis
  - †Chrysolepis sonomensis
- †Chumashius
  - †Chumashius balchi – type locality for species
- Cibicides
  - †Cibicides cushmani
  - †Cibicides martinezensis
  - †Cibicides pseudoungerianus
- Cibicidoides
  - †Cibicidoides midwayensis – or unidentified comparable form
- Cicindela
  - †Cicindela haemorrhagica
  - †Cicindela oregona
- Cidaris
  - †Cidaris martinezensis
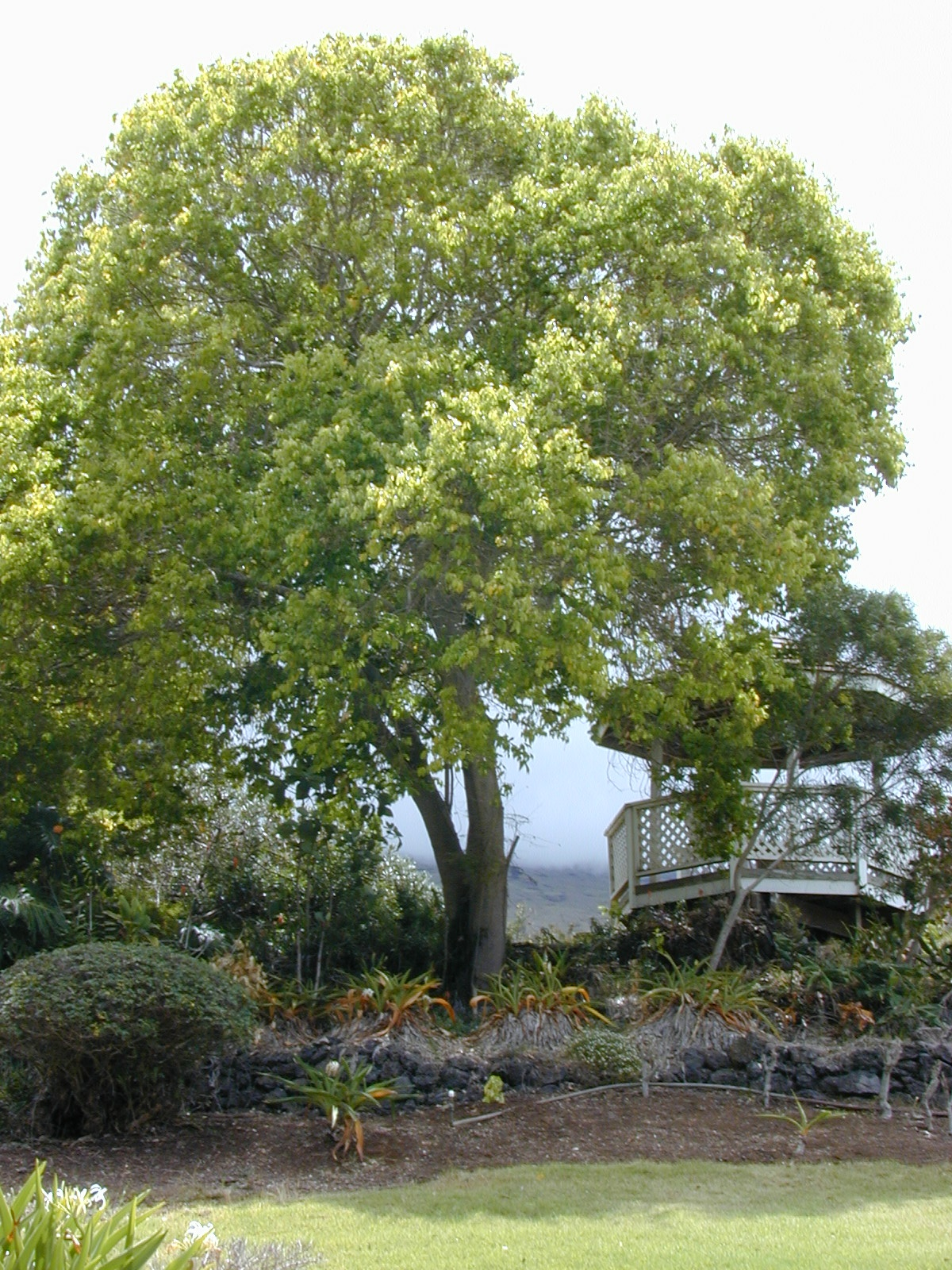
- A living Cinnamomum, or cinnamon tree
  Cinnamomum
  - †Cinnamomum acrodromum
  - †Cinnamomum dilleri
- Cissus
  - †Cissus pyriformis
- †Citellus
  - †Citellus bensoni
- Citharichthys
  - †Citharichthys stigmaeus
- †Claibornites
  - †Claibornites diegoensis
  - †Claibornites muirensis
  - †Claibornites turneri
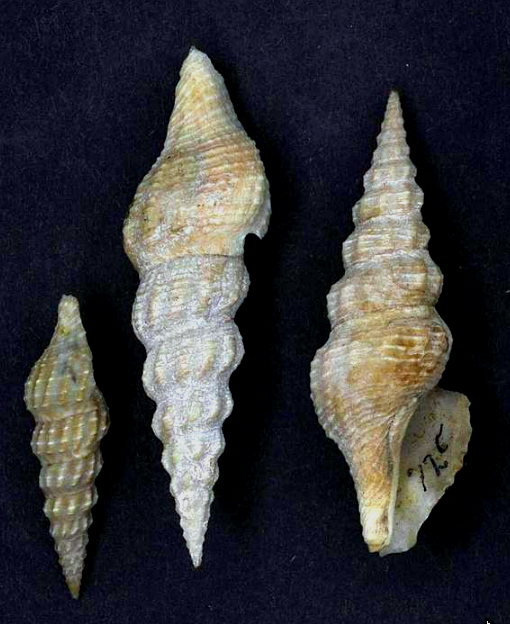
- Shells in multiple orientations of Clathrodrillia sea snails
  Clathrodrillia
  - †Clathrodrillia coalingensis
- Clathurella
  - †Clathurella conradiana
- Clavilithes
  - †Clavilithes tabulatus
- Clavus
  - †Clavus hartleyensis – type locality for species
  - †Clavus hemphilli
  - †Clavus pallidus – or unidentified related form
  - †Clavus temblorensis
- Clementia
  - †Clementia brioniana
  - †Clementia conradiana
  - †Clementia pertenius
  - †Clementia pertenuis
- Clethrionomys
- Cletocamptus
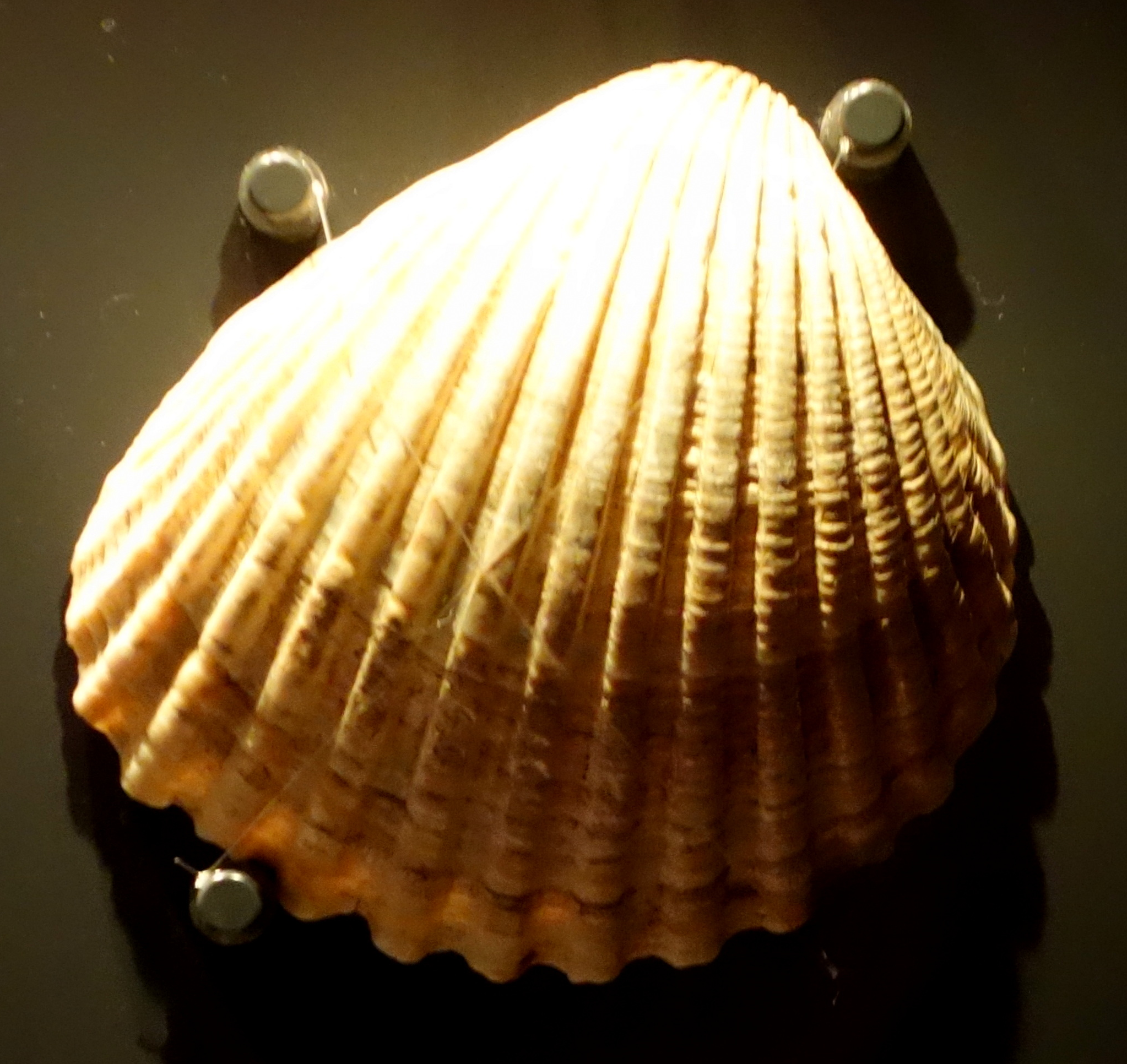
- Shell of a Clinocardium cockle
  Clinocardium
  - †Clinocardium meekianum
  - †Clinocardium nuttallii
- Cliona
- Clupea
  - †Clupea hadleyi – type locality for species
  - †Clupea tiejei – type locality for species
- Clypeaster
  - †Clypeaster bowersi
  - †Clypeaster carrizoensis – type locality for species
  - †Clypeaster deserti
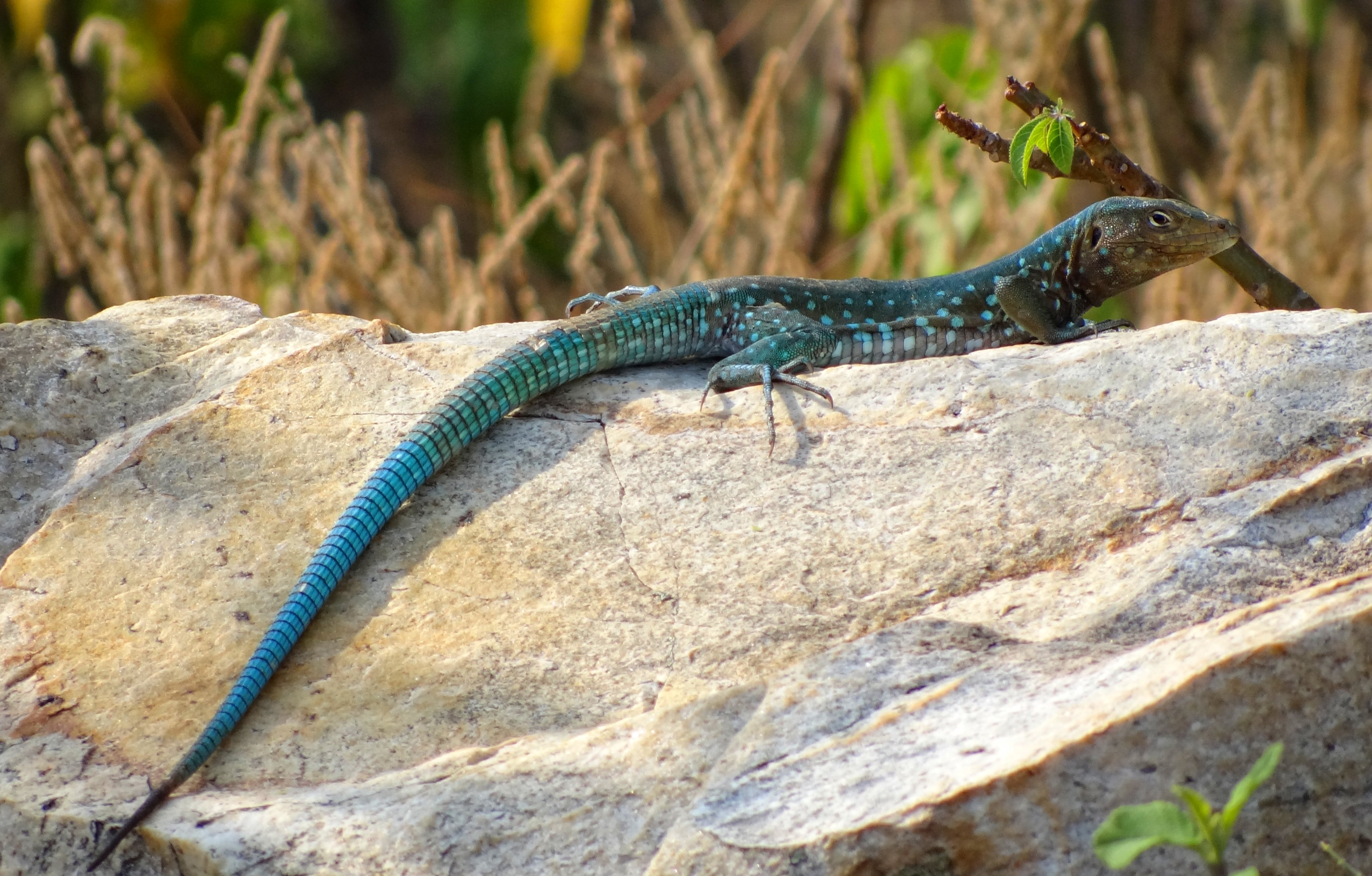
- A living Cnemidophorus, or whip-tail lizard
  Cnemidophorus
- †Coalingodea
  - †Coalingodea tuberculiformis
- Coccodentalium
  - †Coccodentalium emersoni – type locality for species
- †Cocconeis
  - †Cocconeis disculus
  - †Cocconeis placentula
- †Cochlespiropsis – tentative report
  - †Cochlespiropsis jenkinsi – type locality for species
- Cochliomyia – type locality for genus
  - †Cochliomyia macellaria – type locality for species
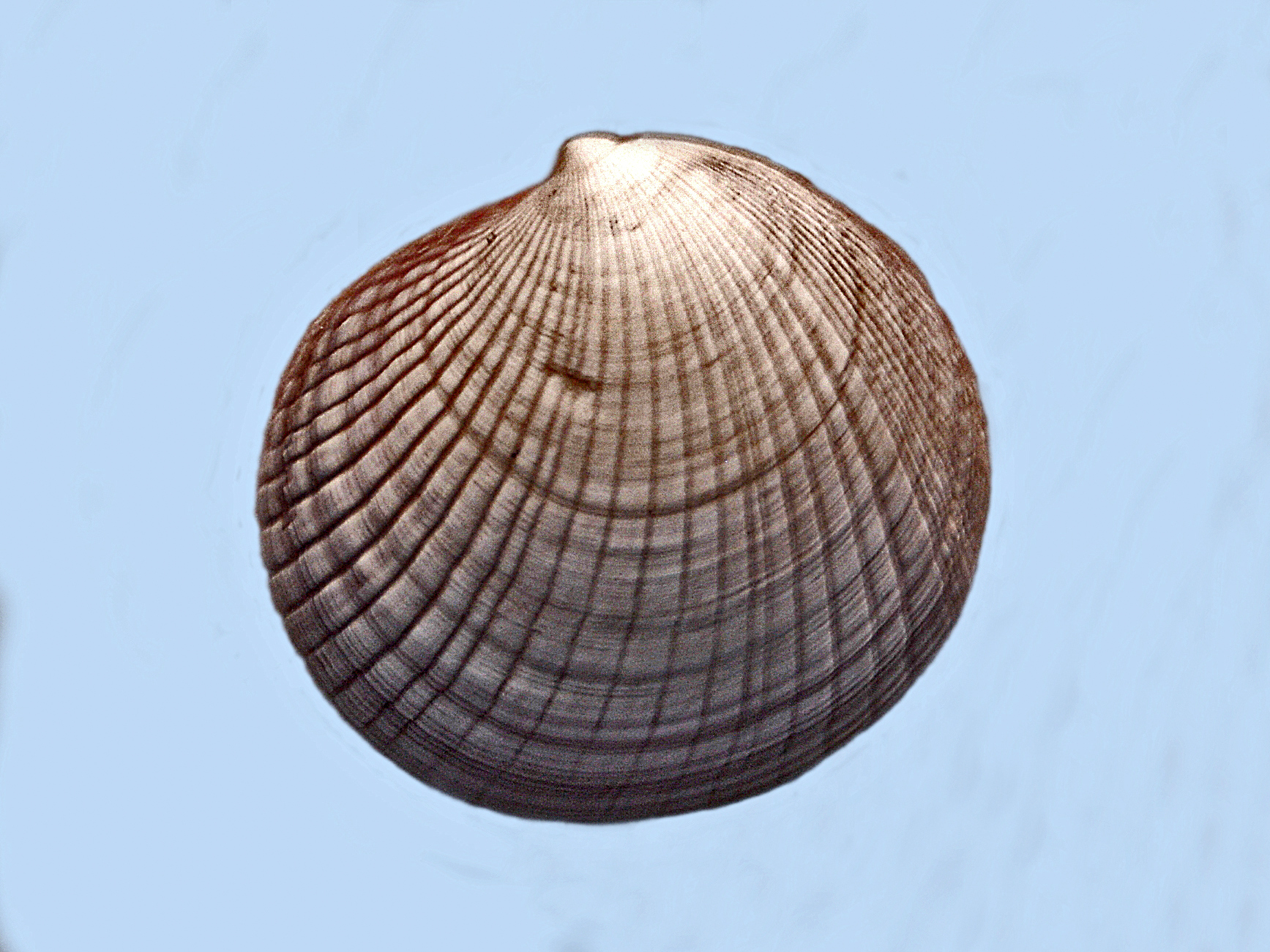
- Shell of a Codakia marine bivalve
  Codakia
  - †Codakia colpoica
  - †Codakia distinguenda
- Colaptes
  - †Colaptes cafer
- †Colodon
- Coluber
  - †Coluber constrictor
- Colubraria
- Columba – or unidentified comparable form
  - †Columba fasciata
- Columbarium
- Colymbus
  - †Colymbus nigricollis
  - †Colymbus parvus
  - †Colymbus subparvus – type locality for species
- Compsomyax
  - †Compsomyax subdiaphana
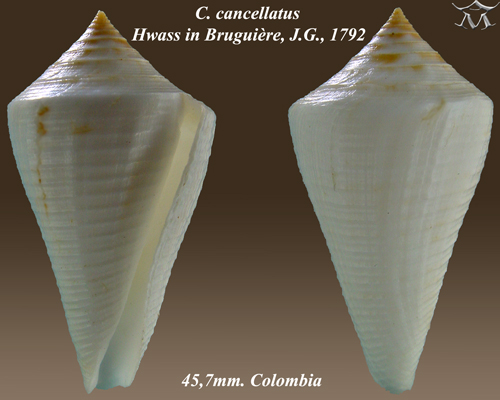
- Shell in two views of a Conasprelloides cone sea snail
  †Conasprelloides
  - †Conasprelloides planiliratus
- Concavus
  - †Concavus concavus
- †Conchocele
  - †Conchocele bisecta
- Coniontis
  - †Coniontis abdominalis – type locality for species
  - †Coniontis elliptica
  - †Coniontis lamentabilis
  - †Coniontis puncticollis
  - †Coniontis remnans – type locality for species
  - †Coniontis robusta
  - †Coniontis rugosa
- Conus
  - †Conus caleocius
  - †Conus fergusoni
  - †Conus hornii
  - †Conus owenana
  - †Conus owenianus
  - †Conus redmondii – or unidentified comparable form
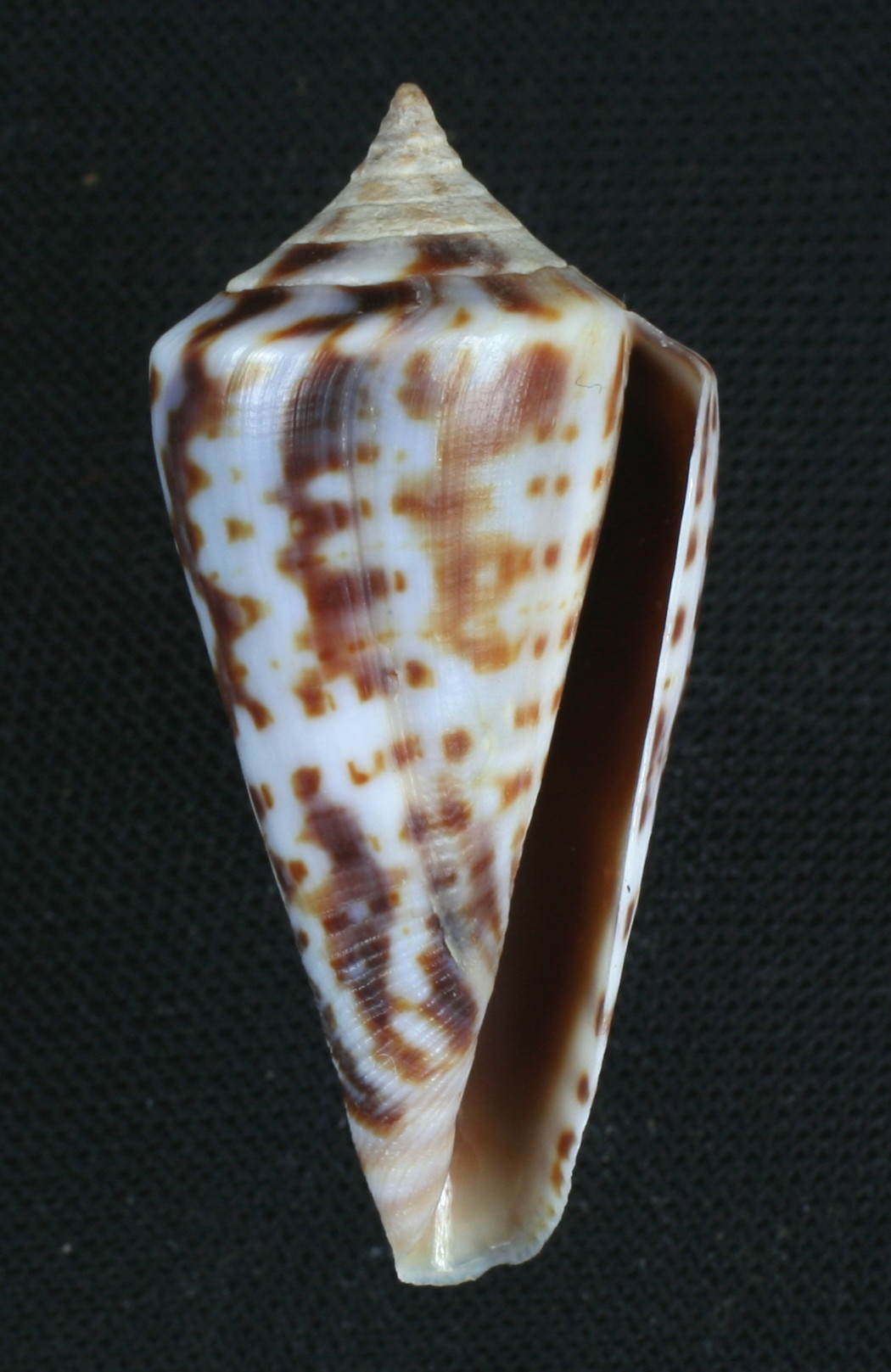
  - Shell of a Conus regularis, or regular cone sea snail
    †Conus regularis
  - †Conus remondii
  - †Conus scalaris
- Cooperella
  - †Cooperella subdiaphana
- †Copemys
  - †Copemys barstowensis – type locality for species
  - †Copemys esmeraldensis
  - †Copemys longidens – type locality for species
  - †Copemys pagei
  - †Copemys russelli
  - †Copemys tenuis – type locality for species
- †Cophocara
  - †Cophocara stantoni
- †Cophocetus – tentative report
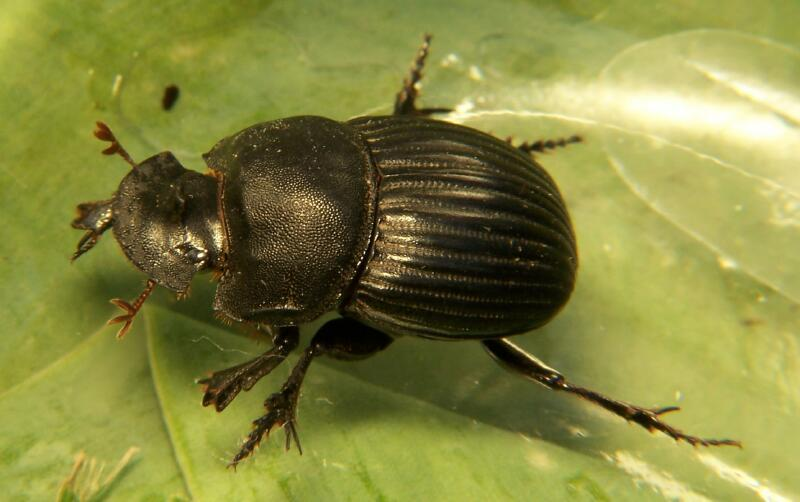
- A living Copris scarab
  Copris
  - †Copris pristinus – type locality for species
- Coragyps
- Coralliophaga
- Corbicula
  - †Corbicula dumblei
- Corbula
  - †Corbula diaboli – type locality for species
  - †Corbula dickersoni
  - †Corbula dilatata
  - †Corbula fragilis
  - †Corbula hornii – or unidentified comparable form
  - †Corbula parilis
  - †Corbula tomulata – or unidentified comparable form
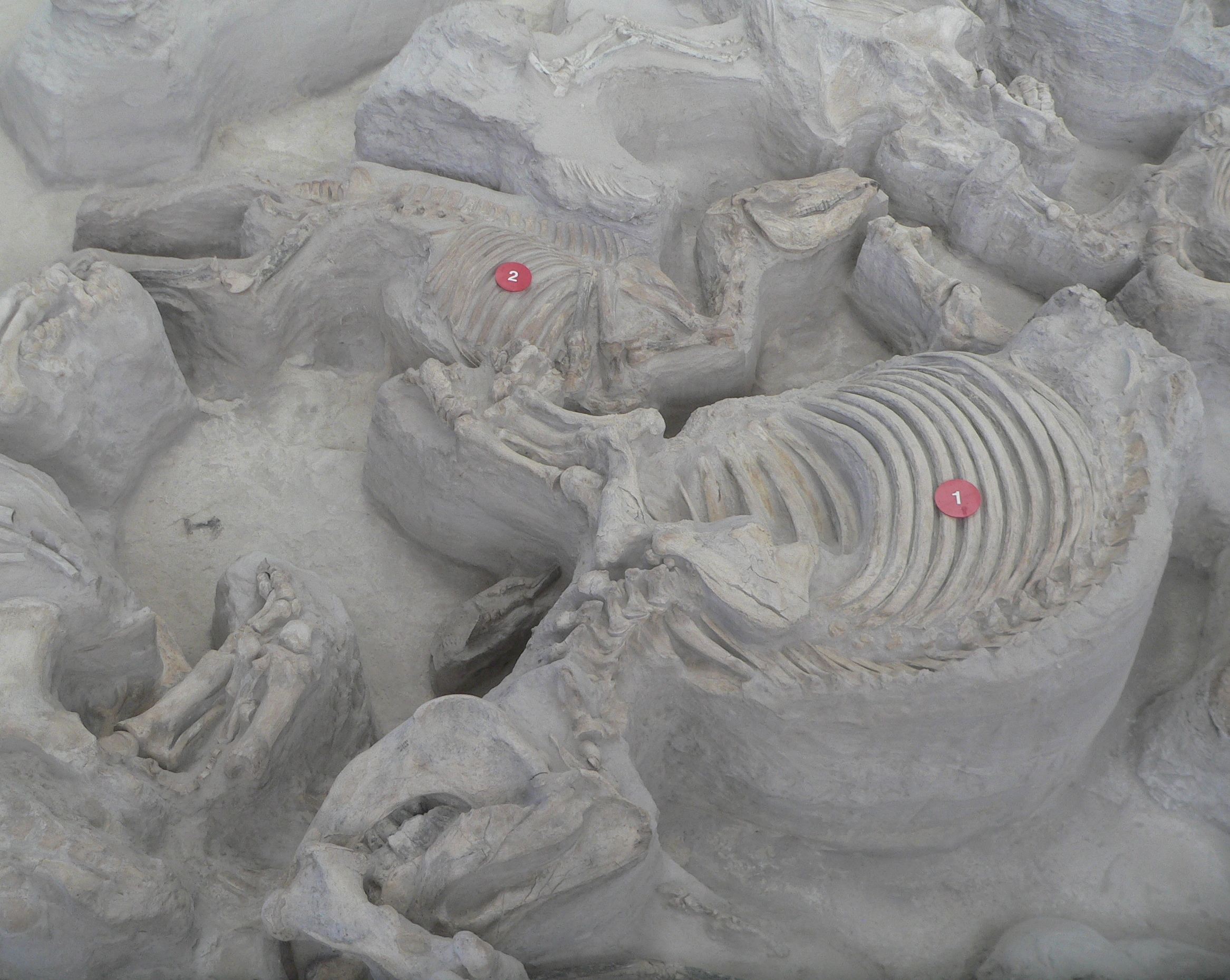
- Fossilized skeleton preserved in situ (upper left, 2) of the Miocene-Pliocene horse Cormohipparion
  †Cormohipparion
  - †Cormohipparion occidentale – or unidentified comparable form
- Cornus
  - †Cornus kelloggii
  - †Cornus ovalis – or unidentified comparable form
- †Coronadus – type locality for genus
  - †Coronadus agilis – type locality for species
- Coronula – tentative report
- Corvus
  - †Corvus brachyrhynchos
  - †Corvus corax
- †Cosomys
  - †Cosomys primus – type locality for species
- †Cosoryx
  - †Cosoryx cerroensis – or unidentified comparable form
- Costacallista
  - †Costacallista hornii – or unidentified comparable form
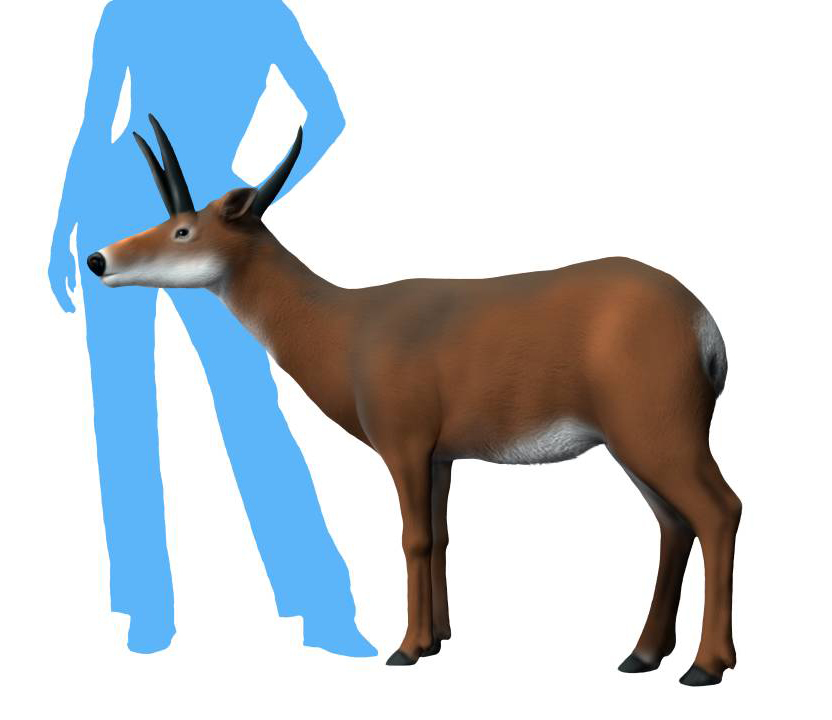
- Restoration of the Miocene palaeomerycid Cranioceras, a relative of modern deer, with anachronistic human to scale
  †Cranioceras
  - †Cranioceras teres
  - †Cranioceras unicornis – or unidentified comparable form
- †Craseops
  - †Craseops sylvestris – type locality for species
- Crassadoma
  - †Crassadoma gigantea
- Crassatella
  - †Crassatella – type locality for species A informal
  - †Crassatella claytonensis
  - †Crassatella compacta
  - †Crassatella granti
  - †Crassatella meganosensis – type locality for species
  - †Crassatella unioides
  - †Crassatella uvasana
  - †Crassatella washingtonensis
- Crassinella
  - †Crassinella nuculiformis
  - †Crassinella pacifica
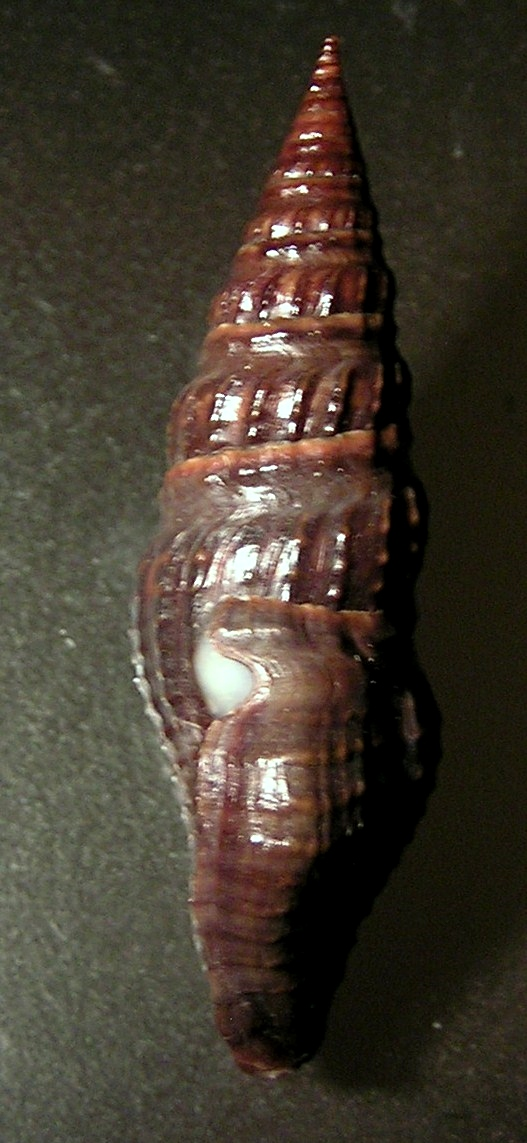
- Shell of a Crassispira sea snail
  Crassispira
  - †Crassispira montereyensis – or unidentified related form
  - †Crassispira zizyphus
- Crassostrea
  - †Crassostrea ashleyi
  - †Crassostrea titan
  - †Crassostrea vaquerosensis
- Crataegus
  - †Crataegus pacifica
- Crawfordina
  - †Crawfordina weaveri
- †Crenaturricula
  - †Crenaturricula crenatospira
- Crepidula
  - †Crepidula adunca
  - †Crepidula coei – or unidentified comparable form
  - †Crepidula diminutiva – type locality for species
  - †Crepidula excavata
  - †Crepidula lessoni
  - †Crepidula nummaria
  - †Crepidula nunimaria
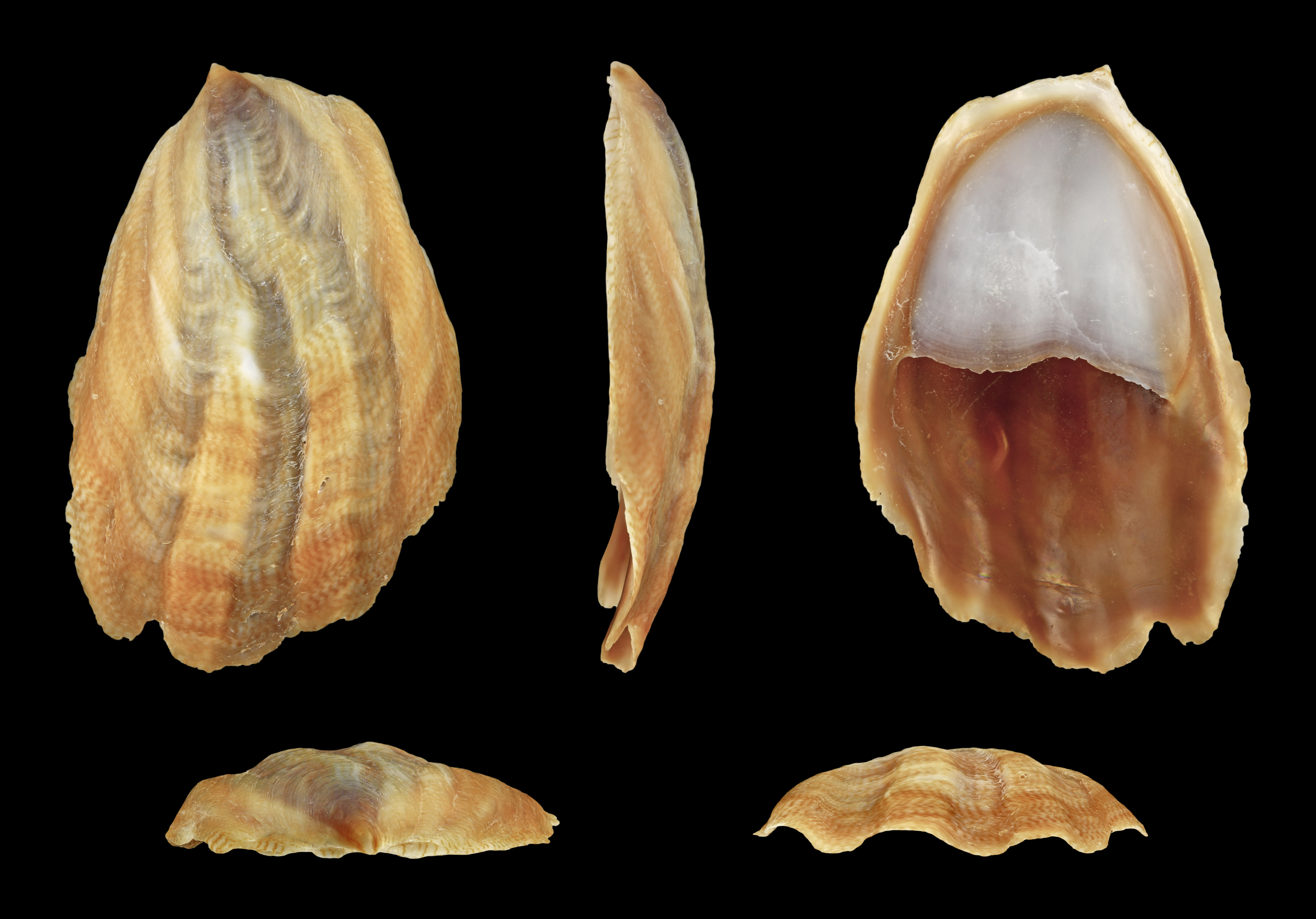
  - Shell in multiple views of a Crepidula onyx, or onyx slipper sea snail
    †Crepidula onyx
  - †Crepidula pileum – or unidentified comparable form
  - †Crepidula praerupta
  - †Crepidula princeps
  - †Crepidula ungana – or unidentified comparable form
- Crepipatella
  - †Crepipatella lingulata
- †Crommium
  - †Crommium andersoni
  - †Crommium pinyonensis
- Crossata
  - †Crossata ventricosa
- Crotalus
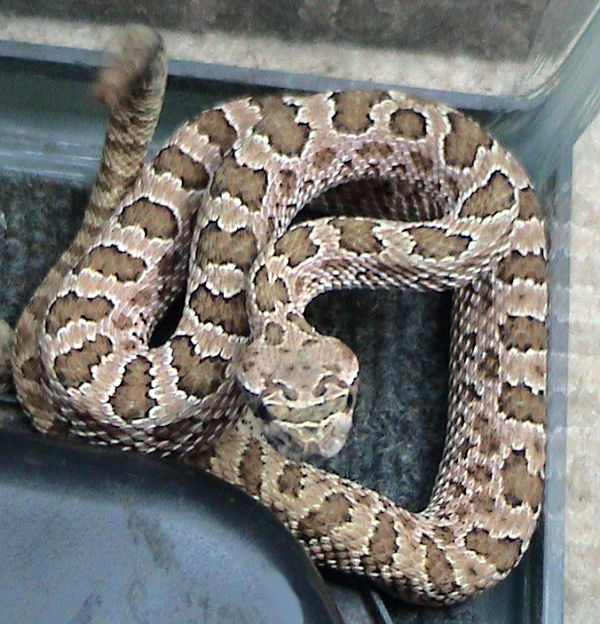
  - A living Crotalus viridis, or prairie rattlesnake
    †Crotalus viridis
- Crucibulum
  - †Crucibulum spinosum
- †Crypholestes
  - †Crypholestes vaughni
- †Cryptocarya
  - †Cryptocarya praesamarensis
- †Cryptoconus
  - †Cryptoconus cooperi
- Cryptomya
  - †Cryptomya californica
- Cryptonatica
  - †Cryptonatica affinis
  - †Cryptonatica aleutica
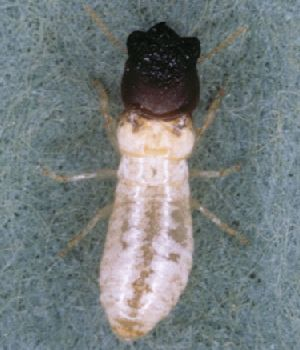
- A living Cryptotermes, or drywood termite
  Cryptotermes
  - †Cryptotermes ryshkoffi – type locality for species
- Cryptotis
- Ctenocardia
  - †Ctenocardia biangulata
- Cucullaea
  - †Cucullaea mathewsoni
  - †Cucullaea mathewsonii
- Culicoides
  - †Culicoides carri – type locality for species
  - †Culicoides fossilis – type locality for species
  - †Culicoides laurae – type locality for species
  - †Culicoides megacanthus – type locality for species
  - †Culicoides mioceneus – type locality for species
- Cumingia
  - †Cumingia lamellosa
- †Cunnolites – tentative report
- †Cupania
  - †Cupania oregona
- †Cupidinimus
  - †Cupidinimus avawatzensis
  - †Cupidinimus bidahochiensis – or unidentified comparable form
  - †Cupidinimus boronensis – type locality for species
  - †Cupidinimus halli
  - †Cupidinimus lindsayi – type locality for species
  - †Cupidinimus tertius
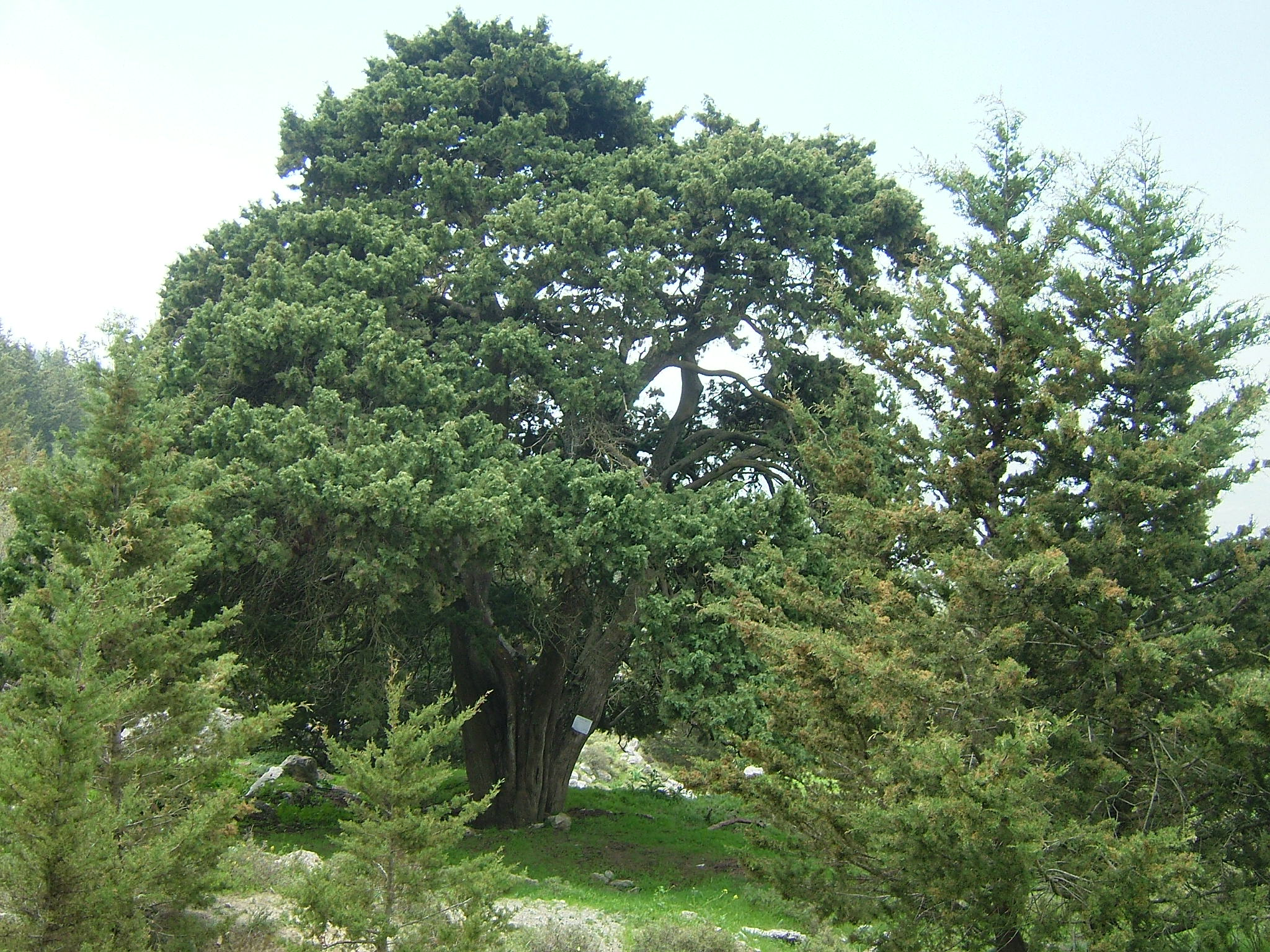
- A living Cupressus, or cypress tree
  †Cupressus
  - †Cupressus goveniana
  - †Cupressus mokelumnensis
- Cuspidaria
  - †Cuspidaria hannibali
- †Cuyamacamelus
  - †Cuyamacamelus jamesi
- †Cuyamalagus
  - †Cuyamalagus dawsoni – type locality for species
- Cyanocitta
  - †Cyanocitta stelleri
- Cybocephalus
  - †Cybocephalus californicus – or unidentified comparable form
- Cyclammina
  - †Cyclammina clarki
  - †Cyclammina incisa – or unidentified comparable form
- Cyclinella
- Cyclocardia
  - †Cyclocardia californica
  - †Cyclocardia montereyana – type locality for species
  - †Cyclocardia ventricosa
- †Cyclocorystes
  - †Cyclocorystes aldersoni – type locality for species
- †Cyclosthone – or unidentified comparable form
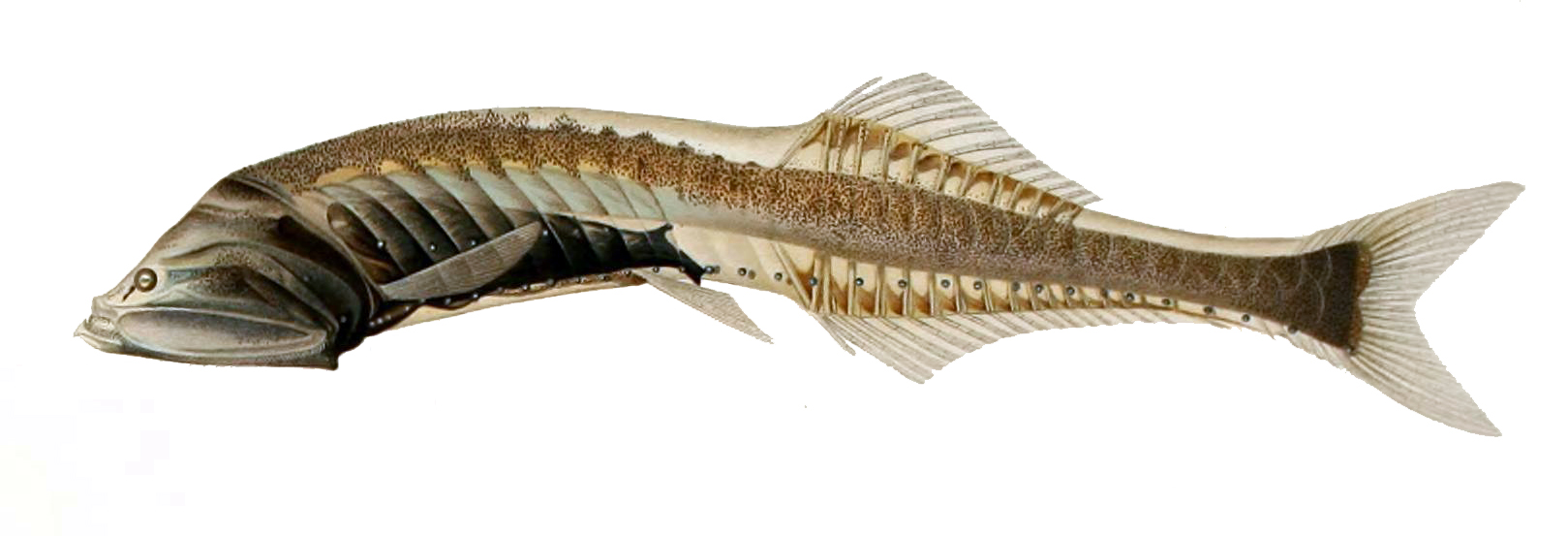
- Illustration of a living Cyclothone bristlemouth
  Cyclothone
- Cygnus
  - †Cygnus columbianus
- Cylichna
  - †Cylichna attonsa
- Cylichnella
  - †Cylichnella attonsa
  - †Cylichnella culcitella
- Cymatium
  - †Cymatium elsemerense
  - †Cymatium janetae – type locality for species
- Cymatogaster
  - †Cymatogaster aggregata
- †Cymbophora
- †Cynarctoides
  - †Cynarctoides acridens
  - †Cynarctoides whistleri – type locality for species
- †Cynarctus
  - †Cynarctus galushai – type locality for species
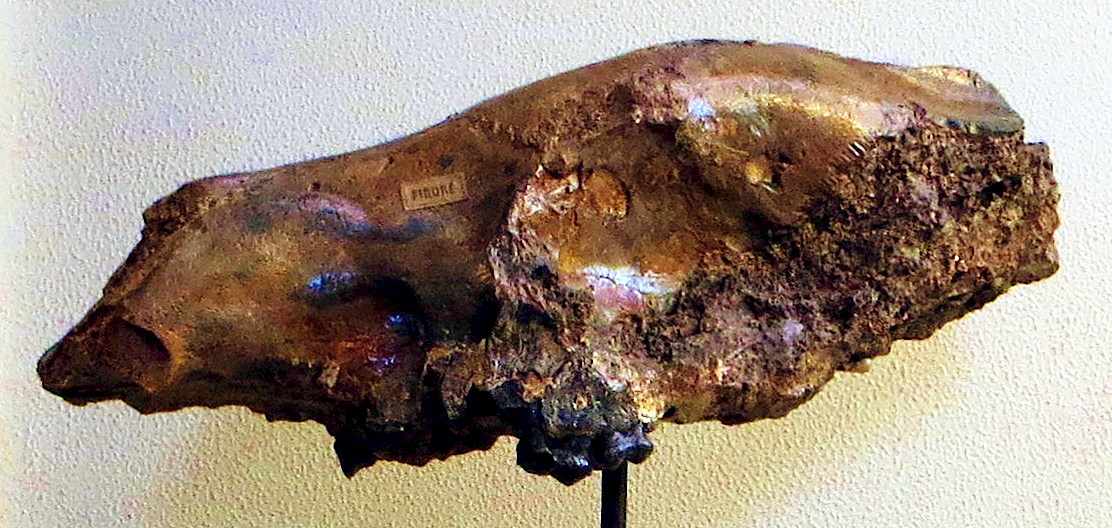
- Fossilized cranium of the Miocene bear-dog Cynelos
  †Cynelos
  - †Cynelos malasi – type locality for species
  - †Cynelos sinapius – or unidentified comparable form
- †Cynorca
  - †Cynorca occidentale
- Cynoscion
  - †Cynoscion eprepes
- Cyperus
- Cypraea
- Cyrena
  - †Cyrena dumblei
  - †Cyrena studleyi – or unidentified comparable form
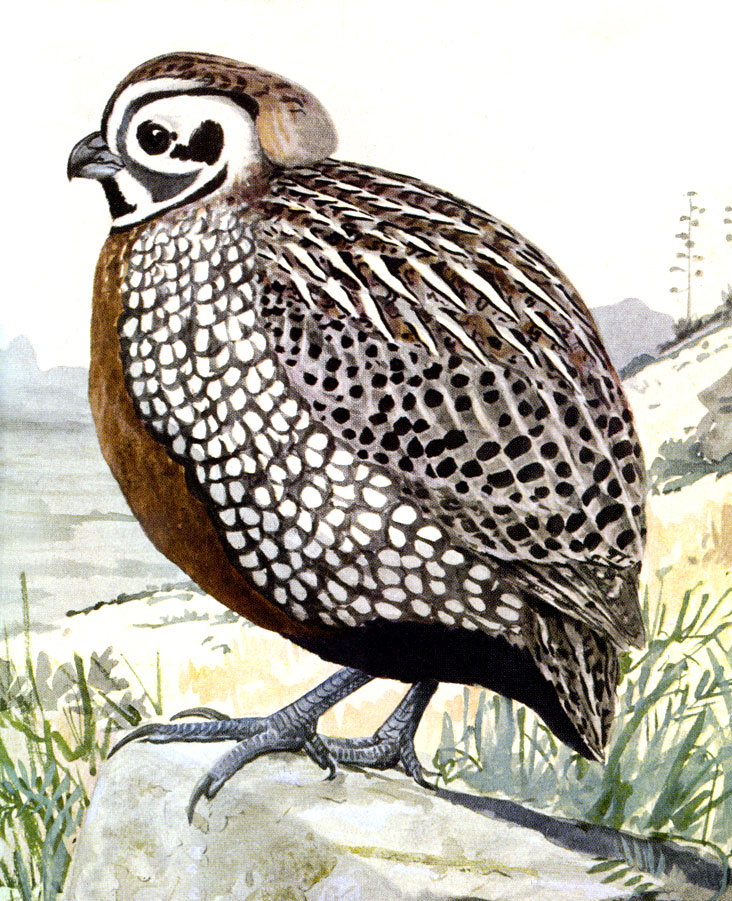
- Illustration of a living Cyrtonyx quail
  Cyrtonyx
  - †Cyrtonyx tedfordi – type locality for species
- Cystiscus
  - †Cystiscus subtrigona
- Cythara
  - †Cythara cetolaca
  - †Cythara hecetae
  - †Cythara interlirata
- Cytherea
  - †Cytherea mathewsoni

== D ==
- †Dalbergia
  - †Dalbergia rubra – type locality for species
- Dallocardia
  - †Dallocardia quadragenarium
- Damalichthys
  - †Damalichthys vacca
- †Daphoenodon – or unidentified comparable form
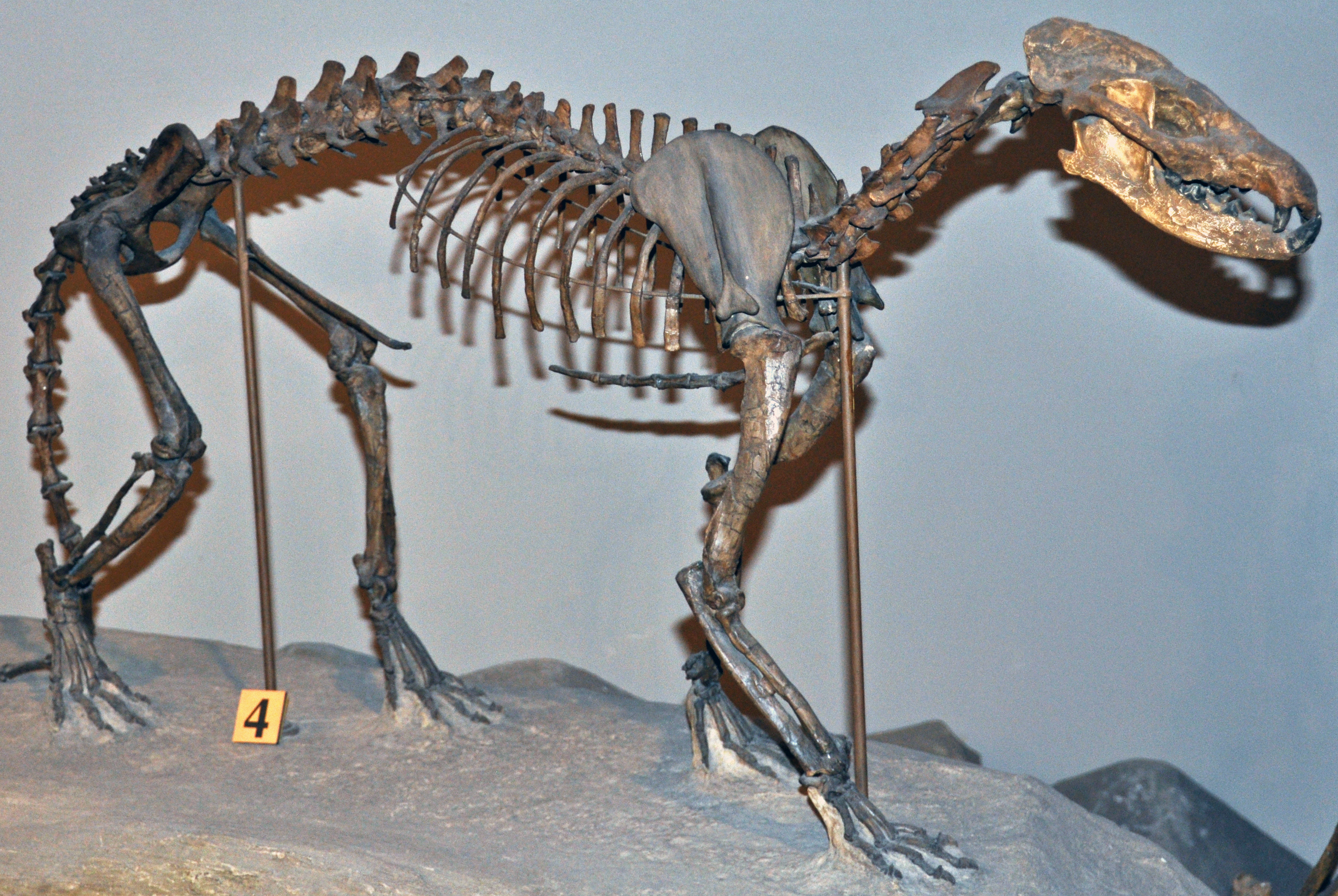
- Mounted fossilized skeleton of the Eocene-Miocene bear-dog Daphoenus
  †Daphoenus
  - †Daphoenus ruber – type locality for species
- †Darbyella
- Dardanus
  - †Dardanus arrosor
- †Dasceles – type locality for genus
  - †Dasceles dassurus – type locality for species
- Dasyatis
  - †Dasyatis dipterus
- Dasyhelea
  - †Dasyhelea antiqua
  - †Dasyhelea browneae – type locality for species
  - †Dasyhelea dara – type locality for species
  - †Dasyhelea judithae – type locality for species
  - †Dasyhelea kanakoffi – type locality for species
  - †Dasyhelea stenoceras – type locality for species
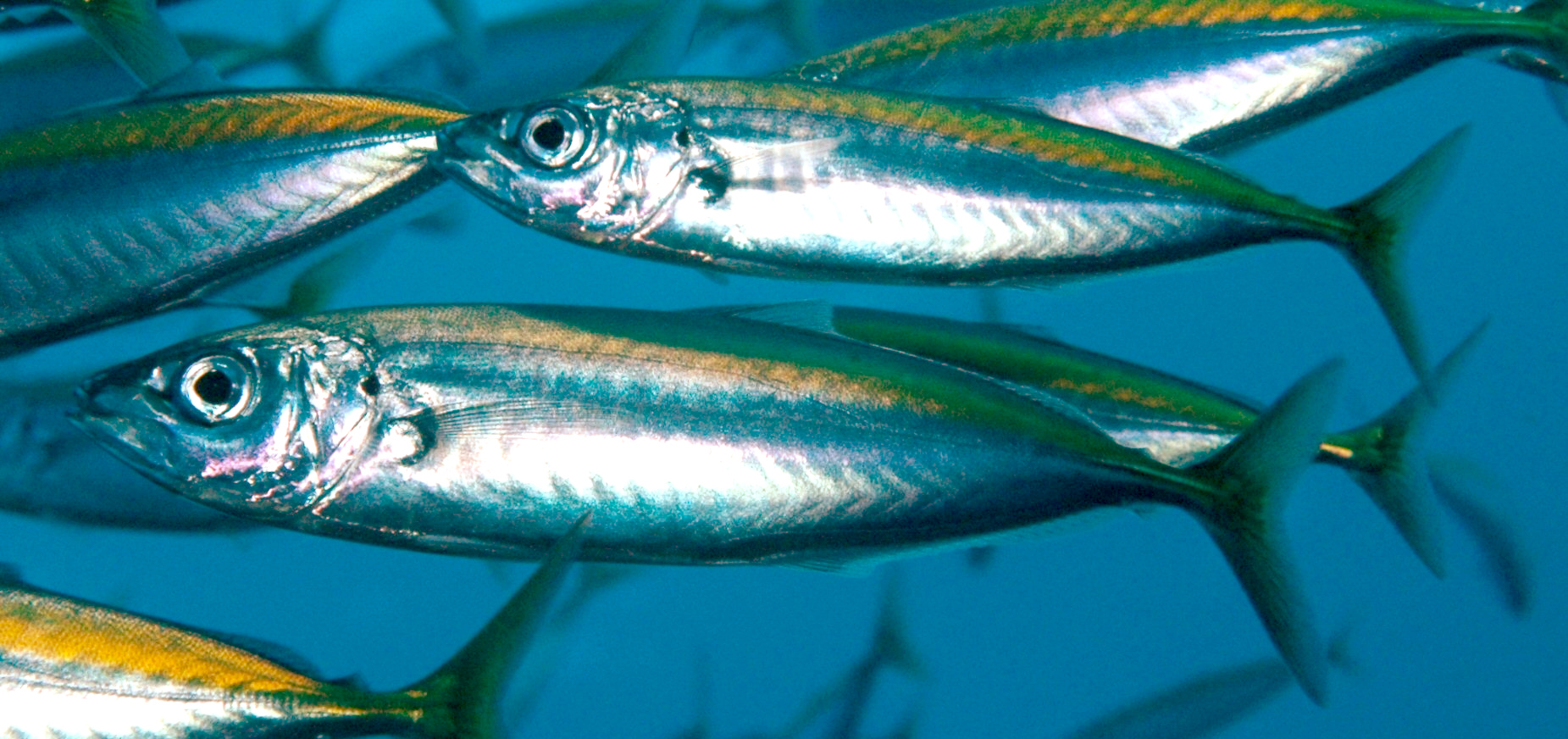
- A school of living Decapterus, or mackerel scads
  †Decapterus
  - †Decapterus hopkinsi
- Delectopecten
  - †Delectopecten lillisi
  - †Delectopecten peckhami
- †Delphinavus – type locality for genus
  - †Delphinavus newhalli – type locality for species
- Deltochilum – tentative report
- Deltocyathus
  - †Deltocyathus whitei – type locality for species
- Dendostrea
  - †Dendostrea vespertina
- Dendragapus
  - †Dendragapus fuliginosus
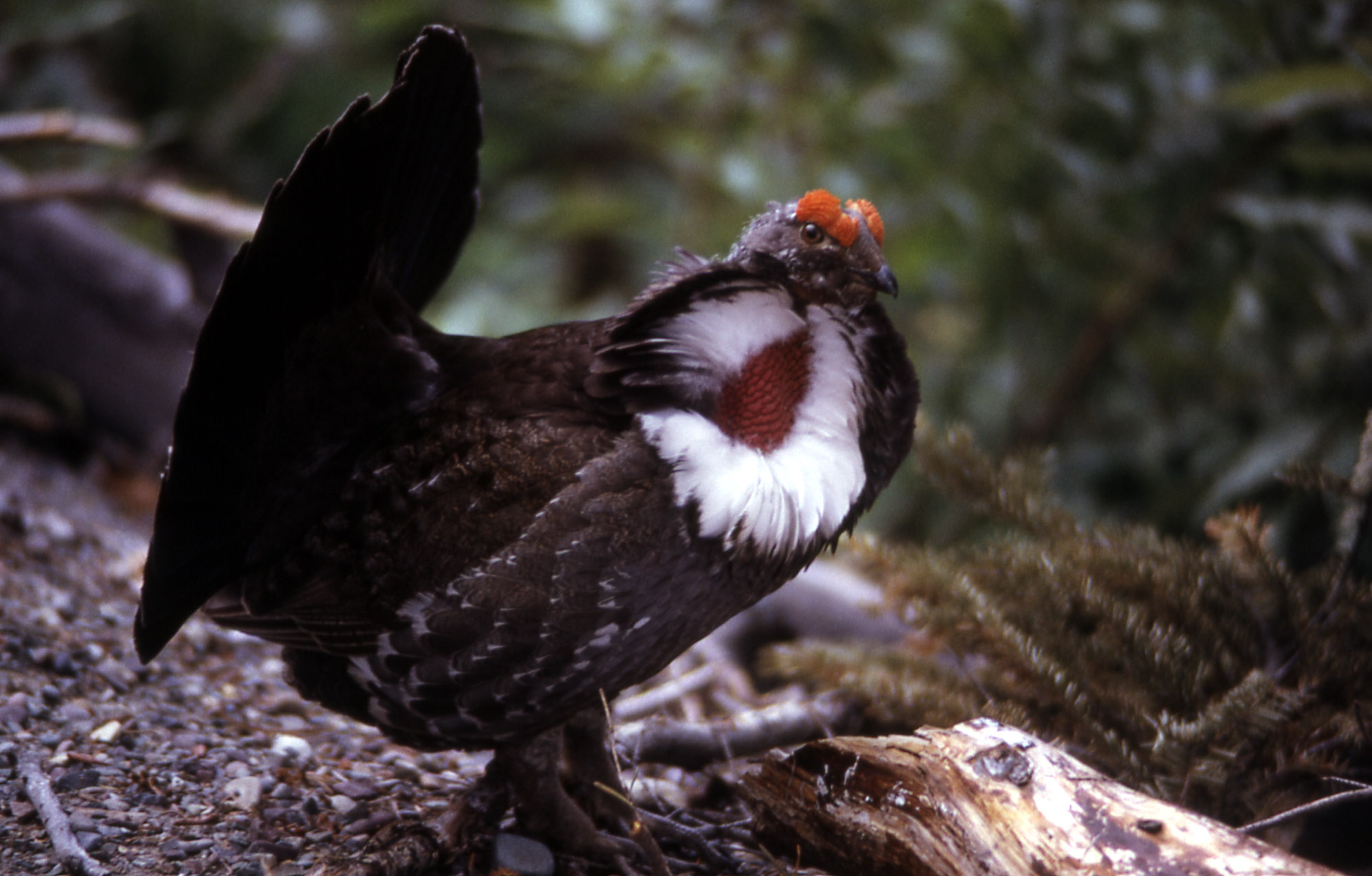
  - A living Dendragapus obscurus, or dusky grouse
    †Dendragapus obscurus
- Dendraster
  - †Dendraster coalingaensis – or unidentified comparable form
  - †Dendraster excentricus
  - †Dendraster gibbsi
- Dendrophyllia
  - †Dendrophyllia californiana – type locality for species
  - †Dendrophyllia oldroydi – tentative report
  - †Dendrophyllia tejonensis – type locality for species
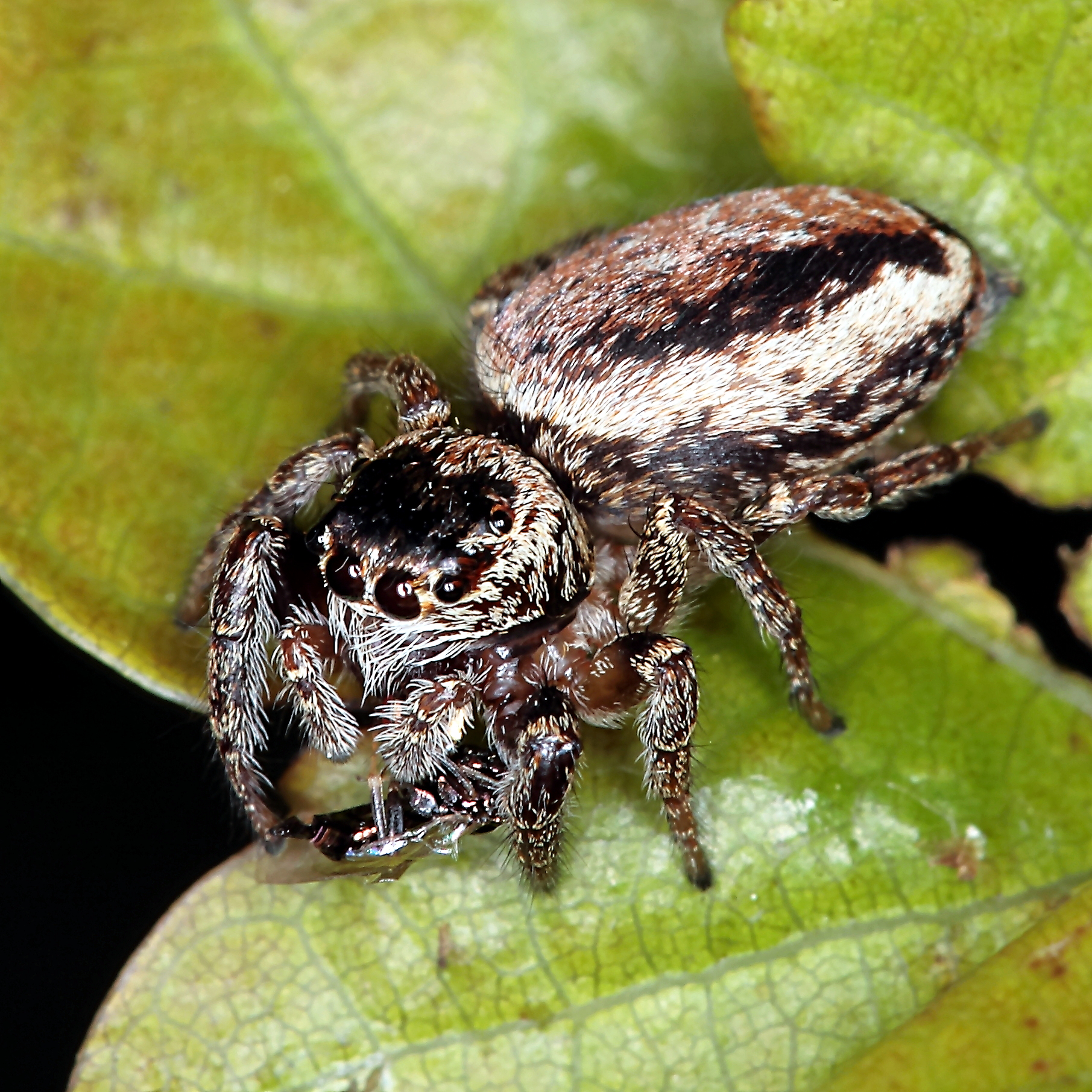
- A living Dendryphantes jumping spider
  Dendryphantes
- Dentalina
  - †Dentalina approximata
  - †Dentalina consobrina
  - †Dentalina cooperensis
  - †Dentalina jarvisi
  - †Dentalina legumen – or unidentified comparable form
  - †Dentalina nasuta
  - †Dentalina pauperata
  - †Dentalina quadrulata
  - †Dentalina spinosa
- Dentalium
  - †Dentalium conradi
  - †Dentalium cooperi
  - †Dentalium laneensis
  - †Dentalium mcganna – type locality for species
  - †Dentalium neohexagonum
  - †Dentalium radiolineata – or unidentified comparable form
  - †Dentalium rectius
  - †Dentalium stentor
  - †Dentalium stramineum
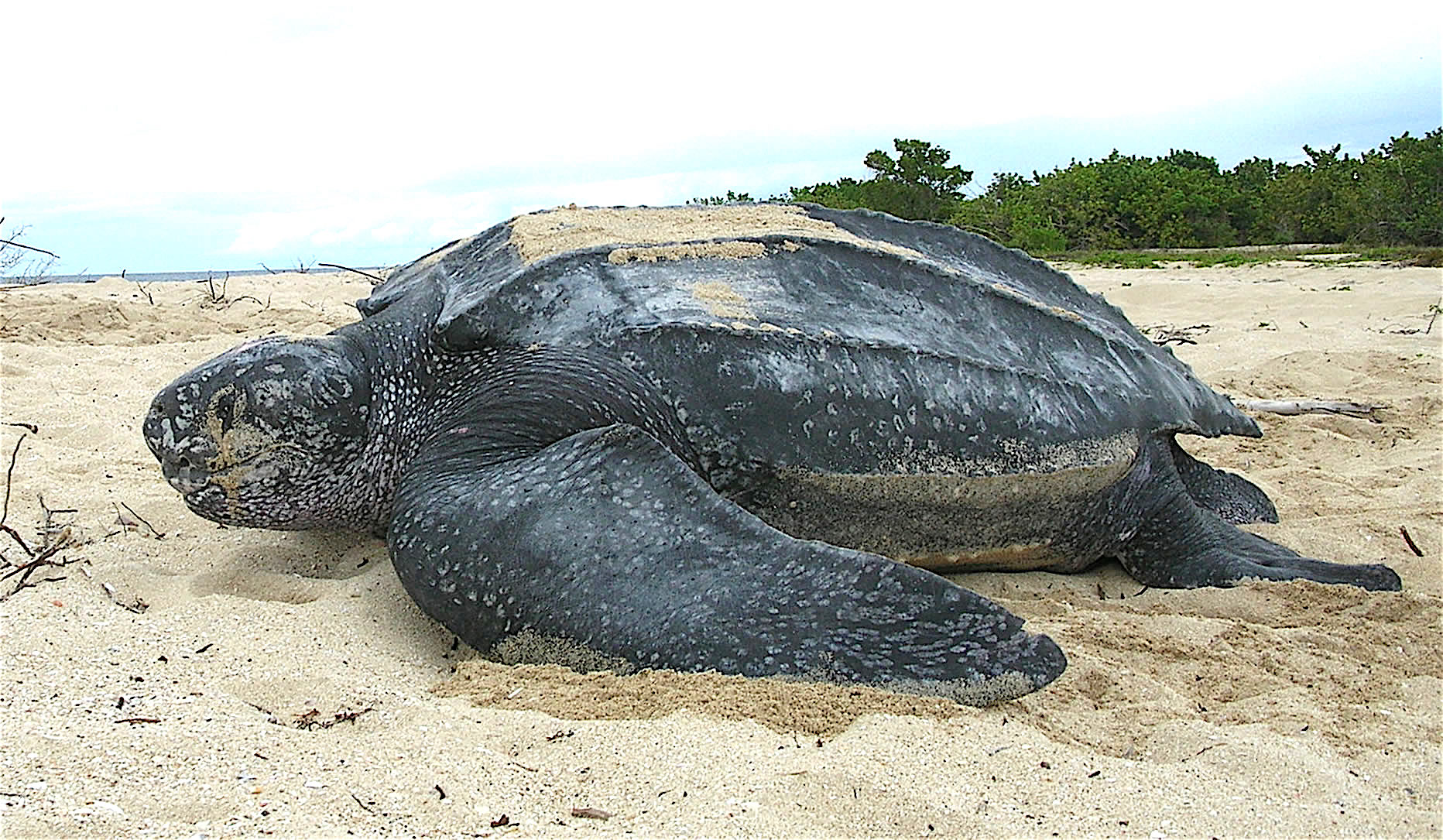
- A living Dermochelys, or leatherback sea turtle
  Dermochelys – or unidentified related form
- Deroceras
- †Derrhias – type locality for genus
  - †Derrhias enantius – type locality for species
- †Desmathyus – or unidentified related form
- †Desmatippus
  - †Desmatippus avus
- †Desmatochoerus
  - †Desmatochoerus hesperus
- †Desmocyon
  - †Desmocyon thomsoni
- †Desmodium
  - †Desmodium indentum – type locality for species
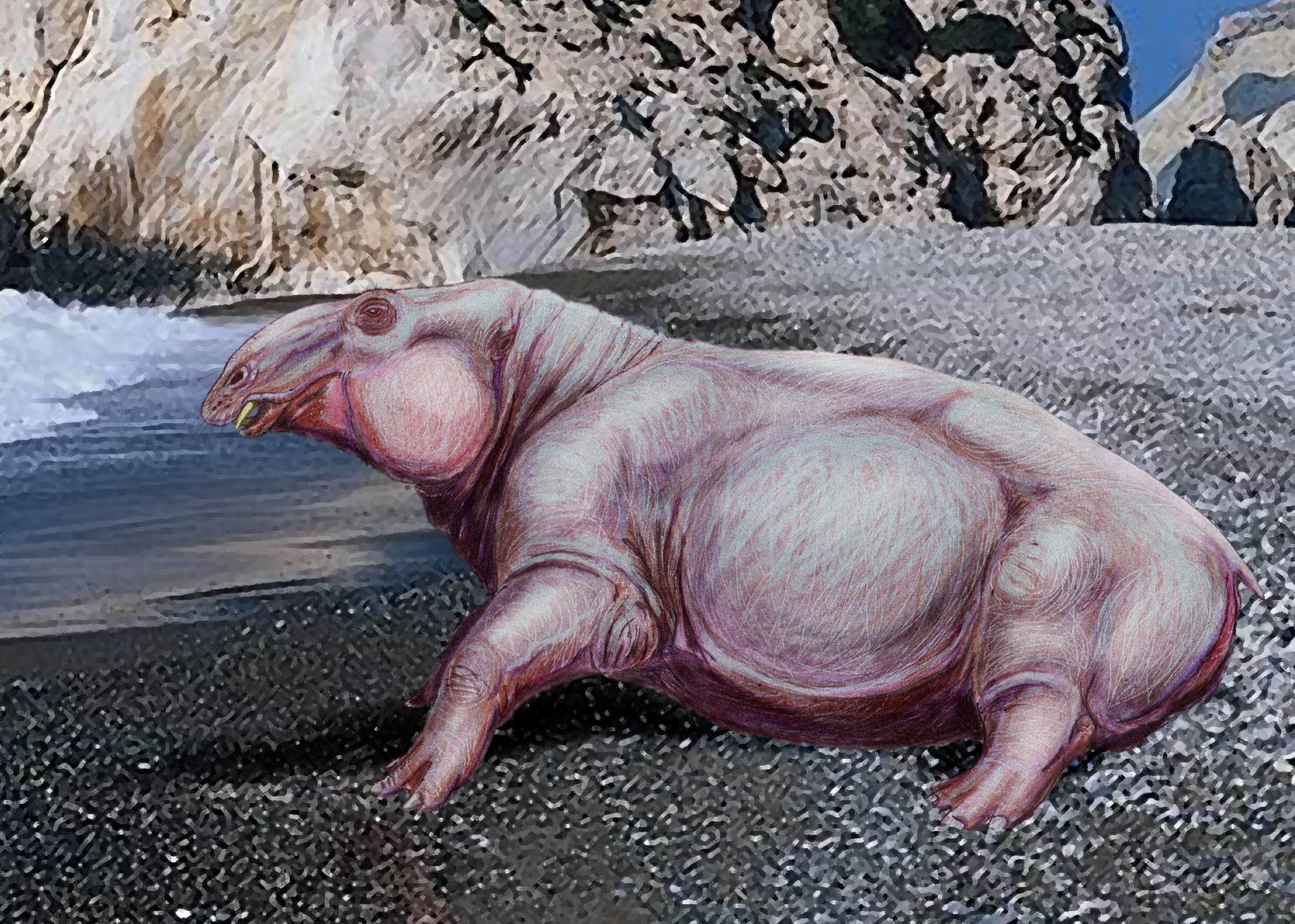
- Life restoration of the Oligocene-Miocene herbivorous marine mammal Desmostylus
  †Desmostylus
  - †Desmostylus hesperus – type locality for species
- Diacria
  - †Diacria trispinosa
- Diaphana
  - †Diaphana brunnea
- †Diceratherium
- Dichocoenia
  - †Dichocoenia merriami
- †Dinohippus
  - †Dinohippus interpolatus
  - †Dinohippus leardi
  - †Dinohippus leidyanus
  - †Dinohippus mexicanus
- †Dinohyus
  - †Dinohyus hollandi
- Diodora
  - †Diodora arnoldi
  - †Diodora aspera
  - †Diodora inaequalis
- †Diomeda
- Diomedea
  - †Diomedea milleri – type locality for species
- †Diomedia
  - †Diomedia albatrus
  - †Diomedia nigripes
- †Dioplotherium
  - †Dioplotherium allisoni
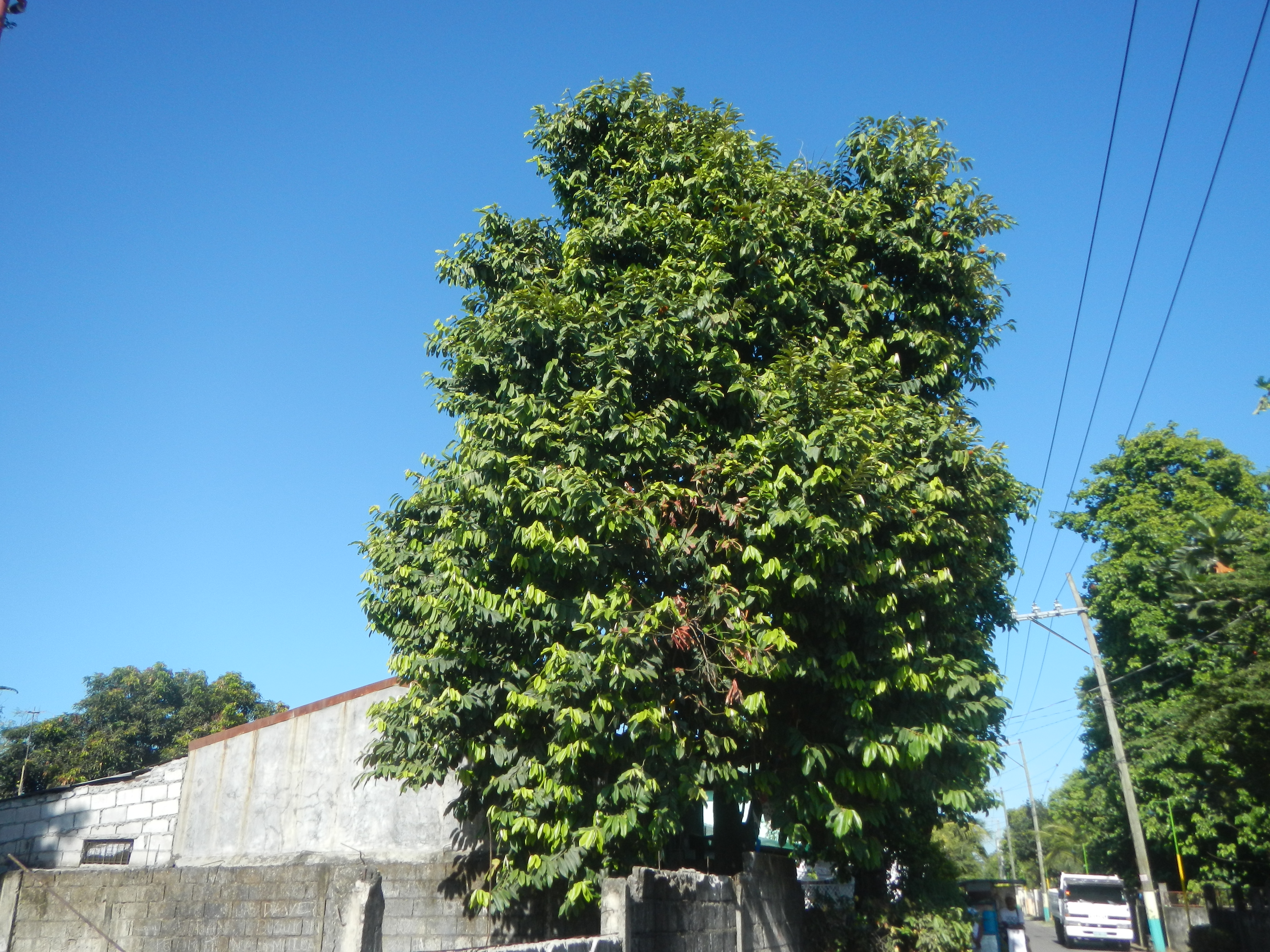
- A living member of Diospyros, the tree genus including ebonies and persimmons
  †Diospyros
  - †Diospyros oregoniana
  - †Diospyros retinervis
- Diplodonta
  - †Diplodonta buwaldana
  - †Diplodonta cretacea
  - †Diplodonta orbella
  - †Diplodonta pariiis
  - †Diplodonta parilis
  - †Diplodonta sericata
- Diploria
  - †Diploria bowersi – type locality for species
- Dipodomys
  - †Dipodomys agilis – or unidentified comparable form
  - †Dipodomys compactus
  - †Dipodomys deserti – or unidentified comparable form
  - †Dipodomys heermanni – or unidentified comparable form
  - †Dipodomys hibbardi
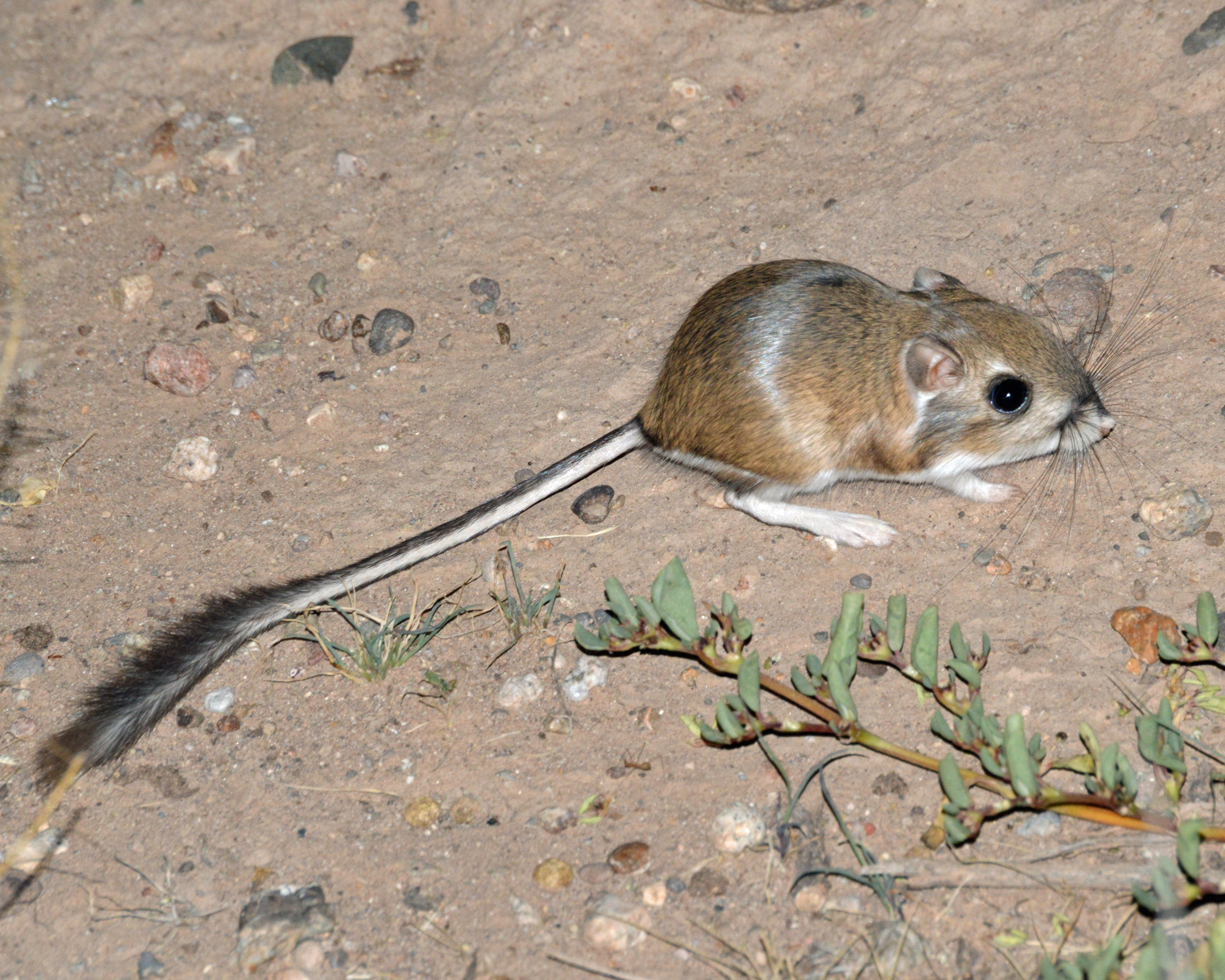
  - A living Dipodomys merriami, or Merriam's kangaroo rat
    †Dipodomys merriami
  - †Dipodomys minor
  - †Dipodomys ordii
- †Dipoides
  - †Dipoides vallicula
- †Diprionomys
  - †Diprionomys parvus – or unidentified comparable form
- Discammina – tentative report
  - †Discammina eocenica
- Discinisca
  - †Discinisca cumingi
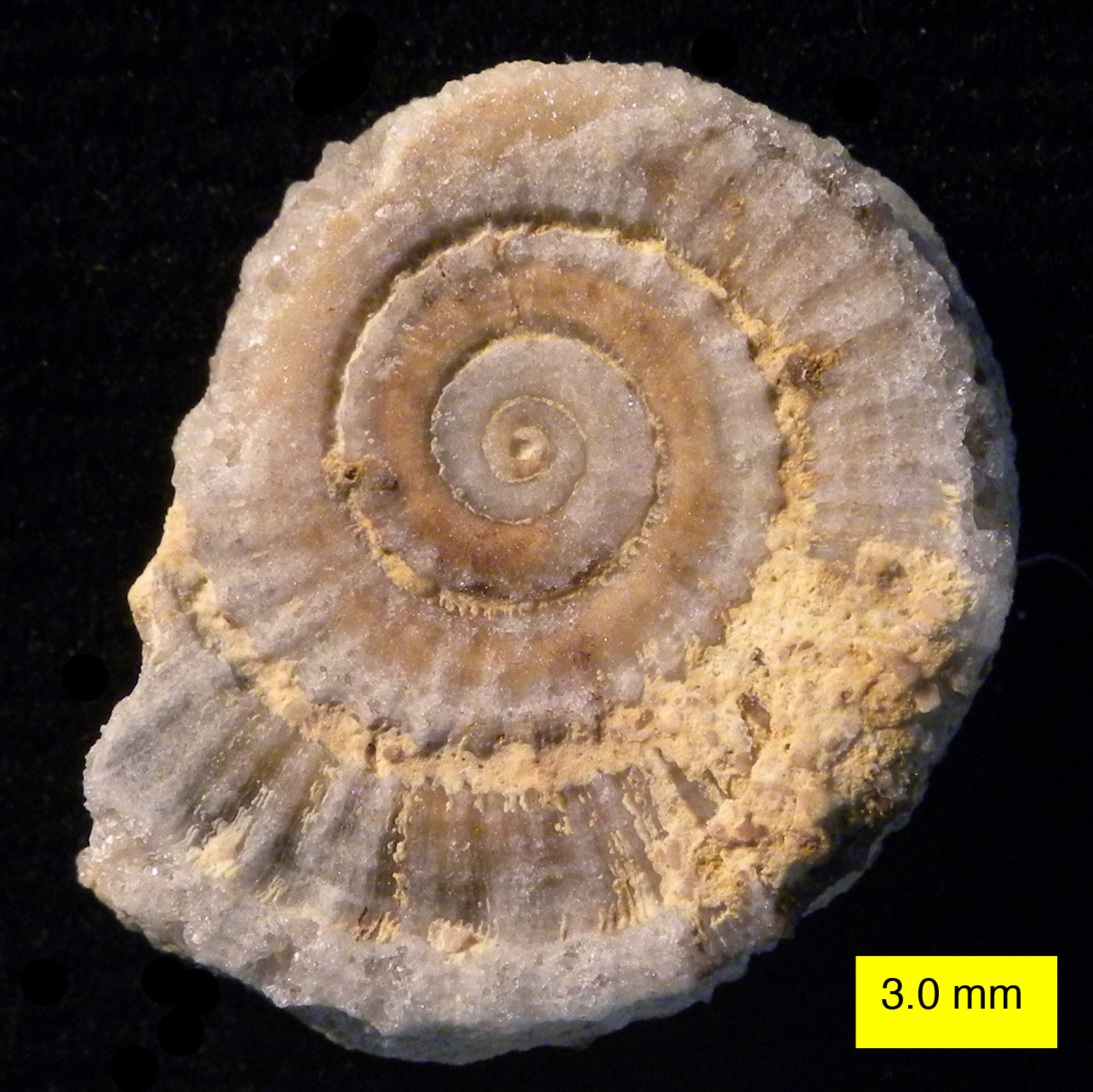
- Fossilized shell of a Discohelix sea snail
  †Discohelix
  - †Discohelix californicus
- †Dissacus
- Distorsio
- Divalinga
  - †Divalinga eburnea
- Divaricella
  - †Divaricella cumulata
- †Domnina
- †Domninoides
- Donax
  - †Donax californicus
  - †Donax gouldii
- †Dorothia
  - †Dorothia californica
- Dosinia
  - †Dosinia conradi
  - †Dosinia dunkeri
  - †Dosinia jacalitosana
  - †Dosinia margaritana
  - †Dosinia mathewsoni
  - †Dosinia mathewsonii
  - †Dosinia merriami
  - †Dosinia milthoidea – tentative report
  - †Dosinia ponderosa
  - †Dosinia santana – type locality for species
  - †Dosinia semiobliterata – or unidentified comparable form
  - †Dosinia whitneyi
- †Dosiniopsis
  - †Dosiniopsis stewartvillensis – type locality for species
- †Drimys – type locality for genus
  - †Drimys defensor – type locality for species
- †Dromomeryx
- †Duchesneodus
  - †Duchesneodus uintensis
- †Dusignathus – type locality for genus
  - †Dusignathus santacruzensis – type locality for species
  - †Dusignathus seftoni – type locality for species
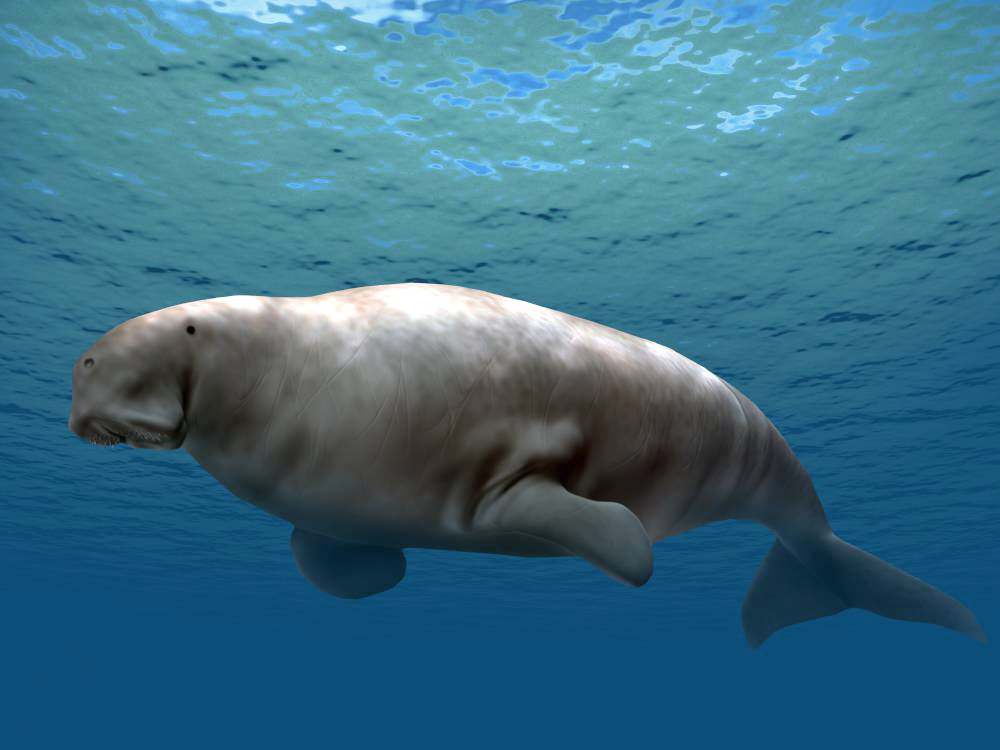
- Life restoration of the Miocene-Pliocene manatee relative Dusisiren
  †Dusisiren
  - †Dusisiren dewana
  - †Dusisiren jordani – type locality for species
- †Dyseohyus – type locality for genus
  - †Dyseohyus fricki – type locality for species
- †Dyseolemur
  - †Dyseolemur pacificus – type locality for species
- Dytiscus
  - †Dytiscus marginicollis

== E ==
- Echinarachnius
  - †Echinarachnius fairbanksi
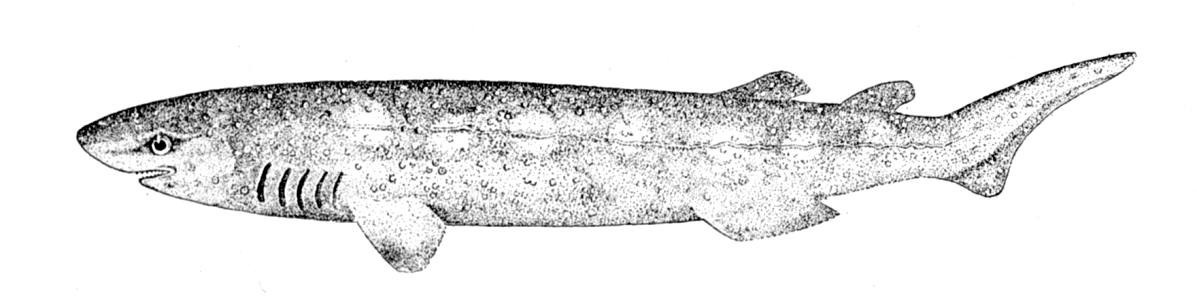
- Illustration of a living Echinorhinus shark
  Echinorhinus
  - †Echinorhinus blakei
- Eclipes – type locality for genus
  - †Eclipes extensus
  - †Eclipes manni
  - †Eclipes santamonicae – type locality for species
  - †Eclipes veternus – type locality for species
- †Ectasis – type locality for genus
  - †Ectasis proriger – type locality for species
- †Ectinochilus
  - †Ectinochilus macilentus
- †Ectopistes
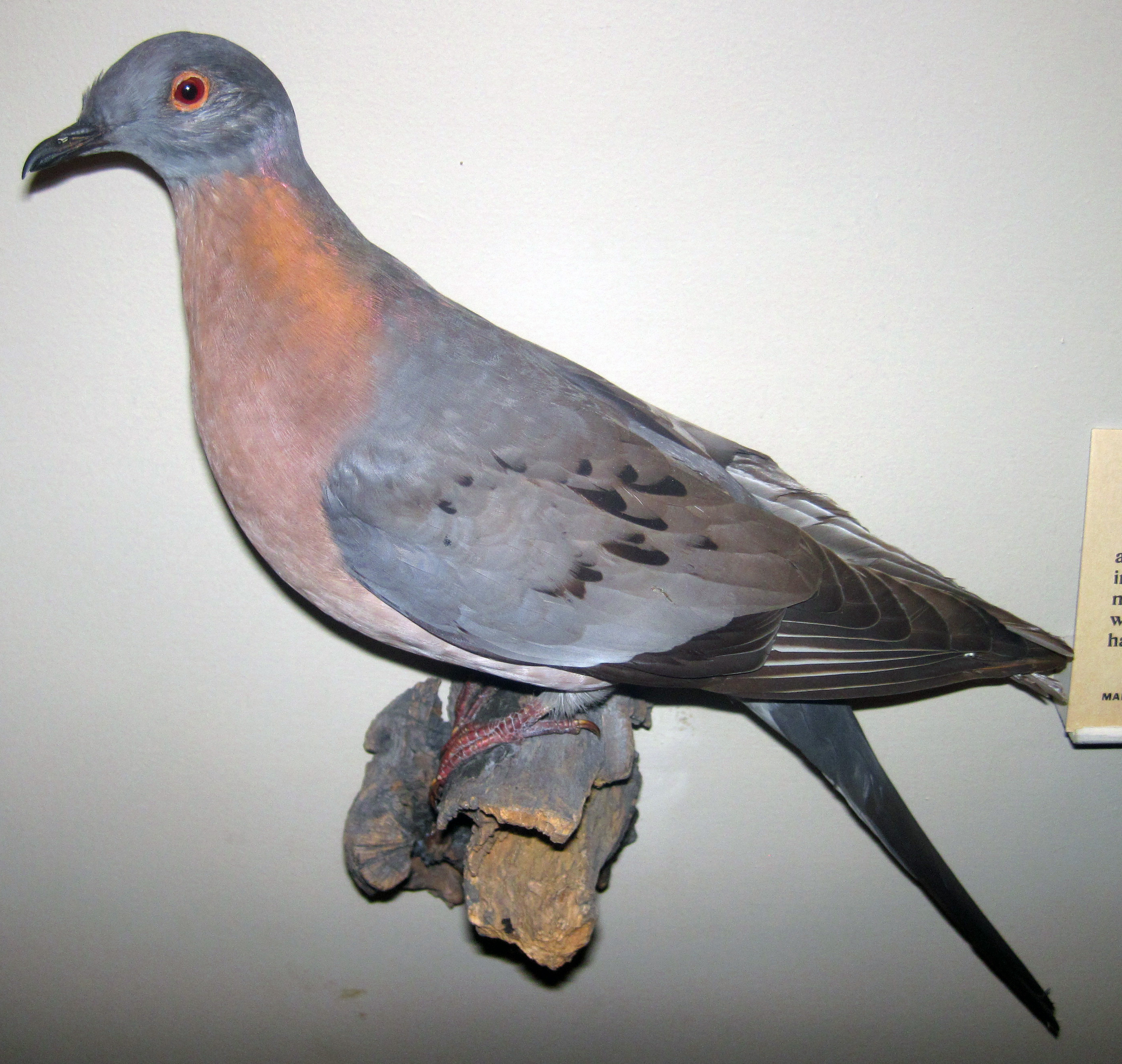
  - Taxidermied male Ectopistes migratorius, or passenger pigeon
    †Ectopistes migratorius
- Eleodes
  - †Eleodes acuticaudus
  - †Eleodes giganteus
  - †Eleodes gracilis
  - †Eleodes grandicollis – type locality for species
  - †Eleodes laticollis
  - †Eleodes omissus
  - †Eleodes osculans – type locality for species
- Elgaria
  - †Elgaria multicarinata
- †Ellimma
  - †Ellimma barbarae – type locality for species
  - †Ellimma elmodenae – type locality for species
- †Ellipsonodosaria
  - †Ellipsonodosaria alexanderi – or unidentified comparable form
  - †Ellipsonodosaria atlantisae
  - †Ellipsonodosaria recta
  - †Ellipsonodosaria spinulosa
- Elliptotellina
  - †Elliptotellina townsendensis – or unidentified comparable form
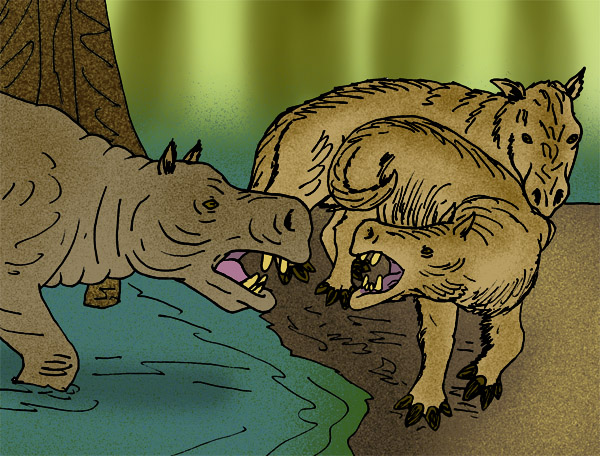
- Life restoration of two of the Eocene-Oligocene anthracothere mammal Elomeryx being menaced by fellow-anthracothere Anthracotherium
  †Elomeryx
  - †Elomeryx armatus
- †Emmachaere – type locality for genus
  - †Emmachaere rhachites – type locality for species
  - †Emmachaere rhomalea
- †Enaliarctos
  - †Enaliarctos mealsi
  - †Enaliarctos mitchelli
- †Enallagma – type locality for genus
  - †Enallagma kirkbyae – type locality for species
- Encope
  - †Encope tenuis – type locality for species
- Engelhardia
  - †Engelhardia nevadensis
- Engina
  - †Engina strongi
- †Engraulites – type locality for genus
  - †Engraulites remifer – type locality for species
- Enhydra
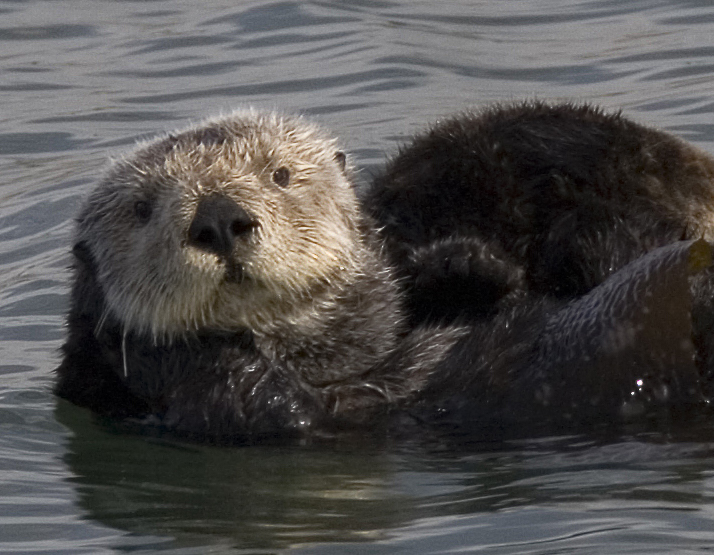
  - A living Enhydra lutris, or sea otter
    †Enhydra lutris
  - †Enhydra macrodonta – type locality for species
- †Enhydritherium
  - †Enhydritherium terraenovae
- Ensis
  - †Ensis myrae
- Entomobrya
  - †Entomobrya atrocincta
  - †Entomobrya kirkbyae – type locality for species
- †Eocernia
  - †Eocernia hannibali
- †Eocypraea
  - †Eocypraea castacensis – or unidentified comparable form
  - †Eocypraea maniobraensis – type locality for species
- †Eogryphus
  - †Eogryphus tolmani – or unidentified comparable form
- †Eohaplomys
  - †Eohaplomys matutinus – type locality for species
  - †Eohaplomys serus – type locality for species
  - †Eohaplomys tradux – type locality for species
- †Eomellivora
  - †Eomellivora wimani – or unidentified comparable form
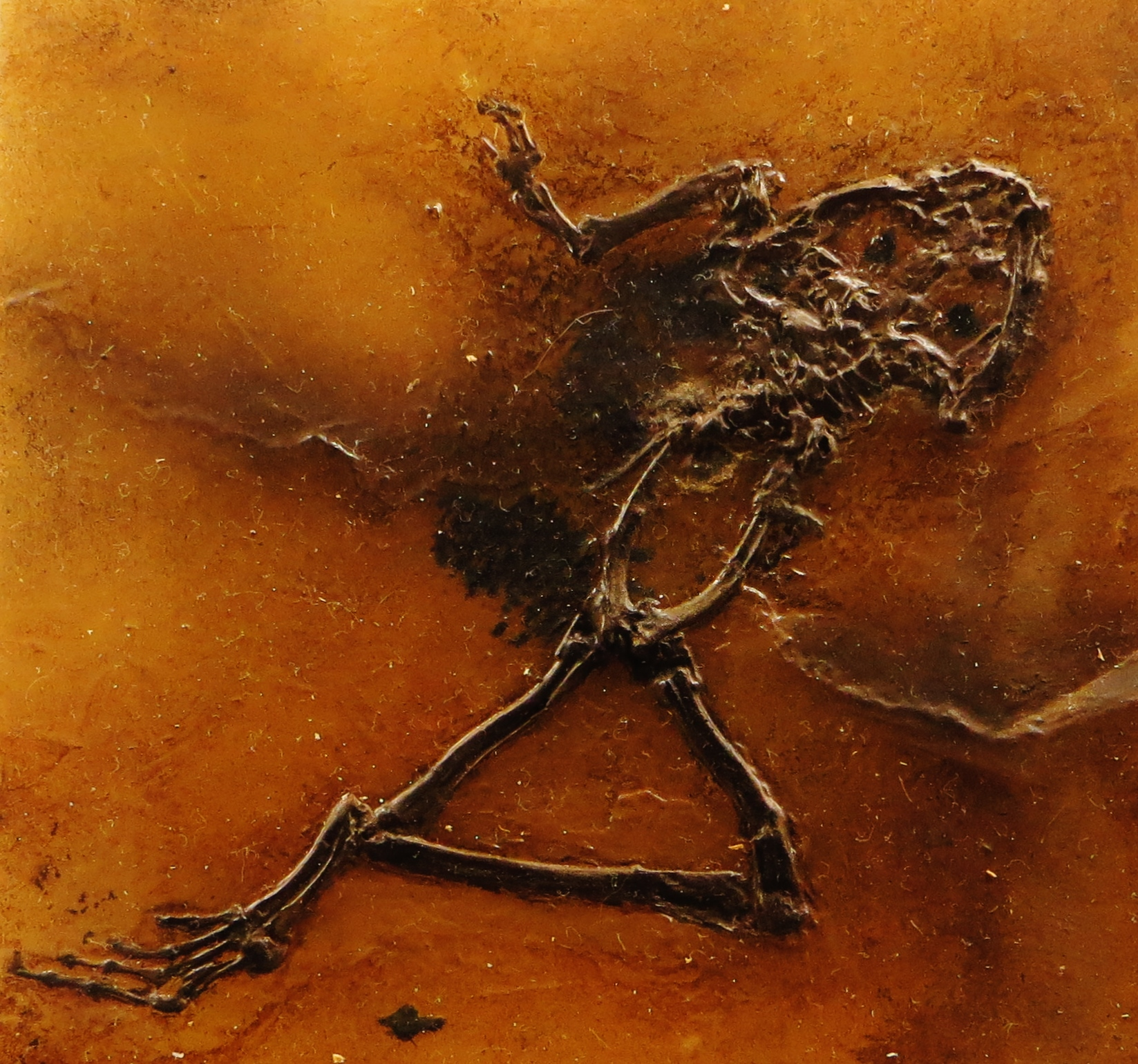
- Fossilized skeleton of the Eocene-Pliocene frog Eopelobates
  †Eopelobates
- †Eopleurotoma
  - †Eopleurotoma whitakerpeakensis – type locality for species
- †Eoscorpius – type locality for genus
  - †Eoscorpius primaevus – type locality for species
- †Eosurcula
  - †Eosurcula inconstans – or unidentified related form
- †Eotaria – type locality for genus
  - †Eotaria citrica – type locality for species
  - †Eotaria crypta – type locality for species
- †Eotibia
  - †Eotibia llajasensis – type locality for species
- †Eotylopus
- †Epelichthys – type locality for genus
  - †Epelichthys michaelis – type locality for species
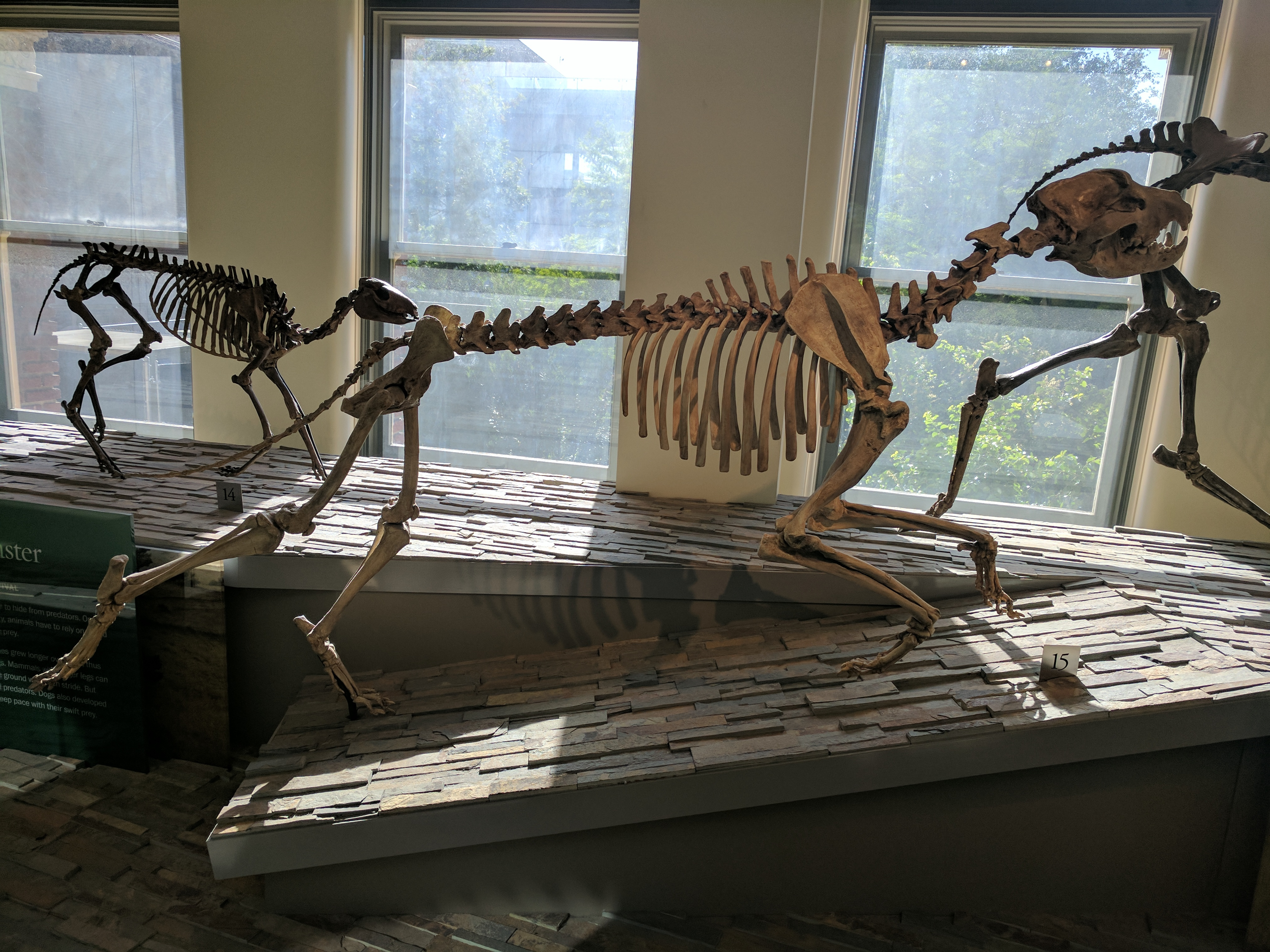
- Mounted fossilized skeleton of the Miocene bone-crushing dog Epicyon
  †Epicyon
  - †Epicyon haydeni
  - †Epicyon saevus
- †Epihippus
- Epilucina
  - †Epilucina californica
- Epinephelus
- †Epiphragmophora
  - †Epiphragmophora mormonum
- †Epistomina
  - †Epistomina eocenica
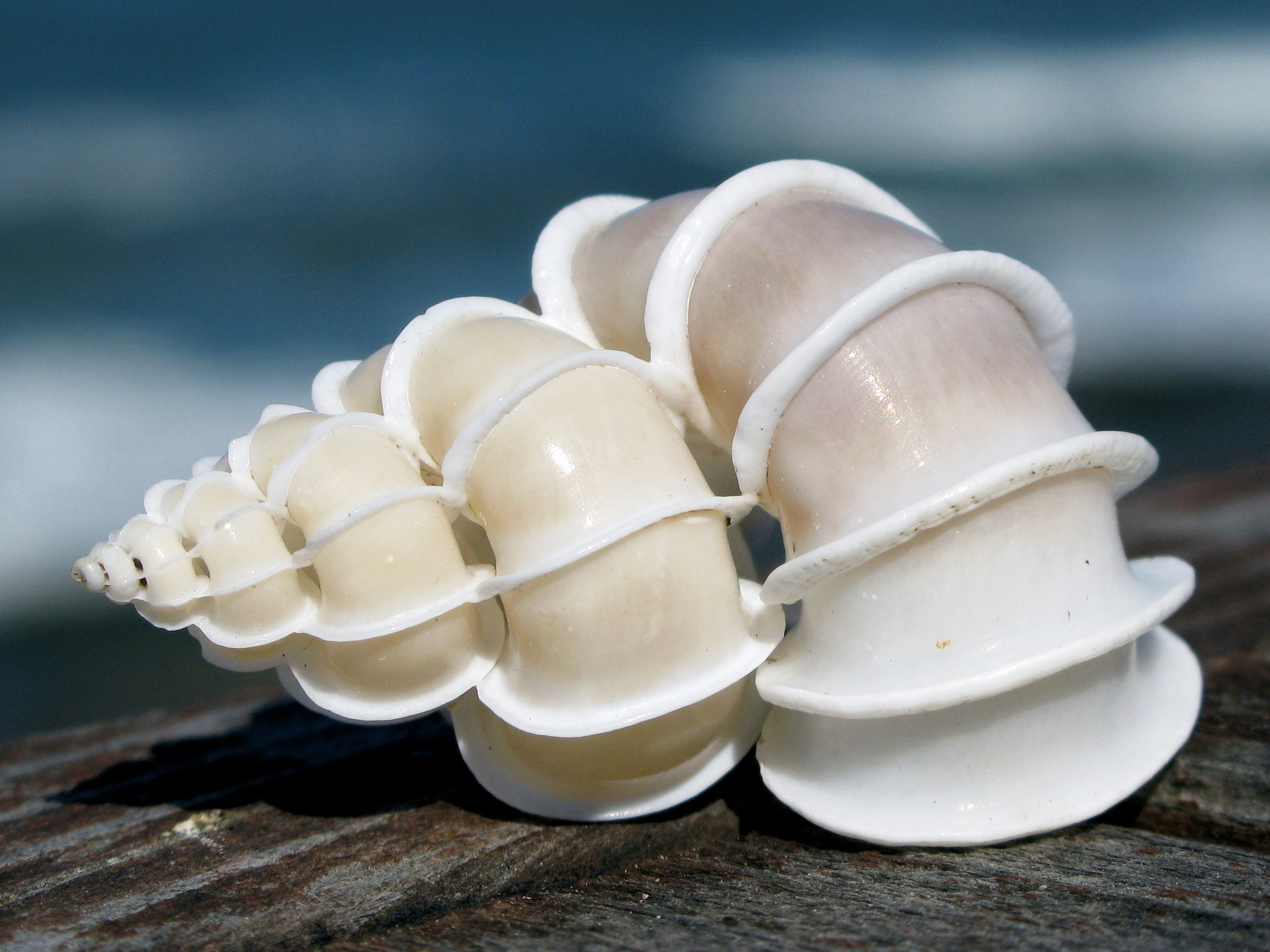
- Shell of an Epitonium wentletrap sea snail
  Epitonium
  - †Epitonium bellastriata
  - †Epitonium bellastriatum
  - †Epitonium clarki
  - †Epitonium condoni
  - †Epitonium cookii – or unidentified related form
  - †Epitonium cooperi
  - †Epitonium indianorum
  - †Epitonium insculptum
  - †Epitonium rugiferum – or unidentified comparable form
  - †Epitonium sawinae
- Eponides
  - †Eponides keenani
  - †Eponides kleinpelli
  - †Eponides lodoensis
  - †Eponides umbonatus
- Eptesicus
  - †Eptesicus fuscus – or unidentified comparable form
- †Equisetum
- Equus
  - †Equus conversidens
  - †Equus enormis
  - †Equus idahoensis
  - †Equus pacificus
  - †Equus scotti
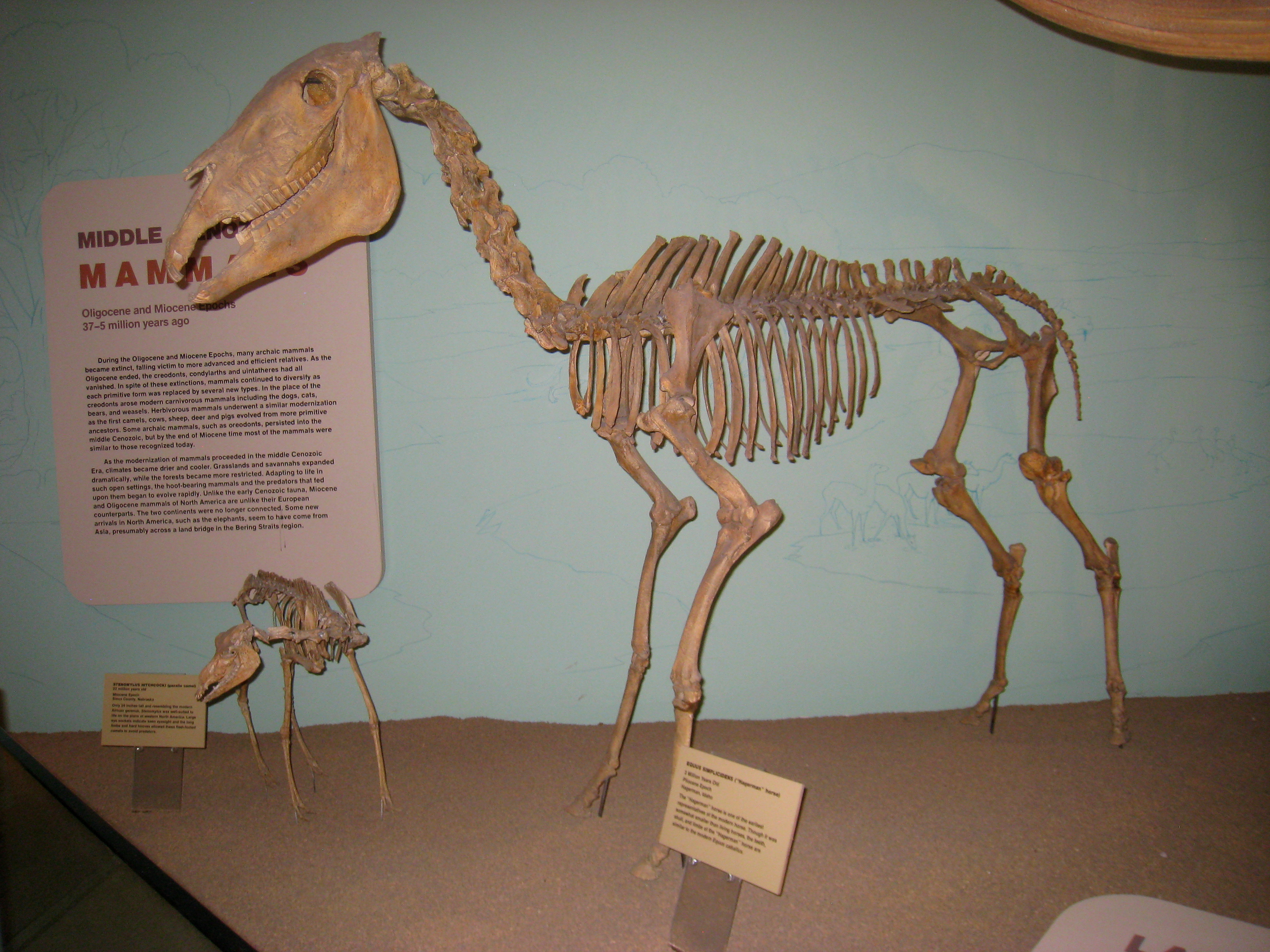
  - Fossilized skeleton of the Pliocene-Pleistocene horse Equus simplicidens, also known as the Hagerman horse or American zebra
    †Equus simplicidens
- Eremophila
  - †Eremophila alpestris
- Erethizon
  - †Erethizon bathygnathum
  - †Erethizon cascoensis – type locality for species
  - †Erethizon dorsatum
- †Eriquius
  - †Eriquius plectrodes
- †Erisceles – type locality for genus
  - †Erisceles pristinus – type locality for species
- †Eritima
  - †Eritima evides – type locality for species
- †Escharion – type locality for genus
  - †Escharion townleyi – type locality for species
- Eschrichtius
  - †Eschrichtius robustus – or unidentified comparable form
- †Etringus
  - †Etringus scintillans
- Eubalaena – or unidentified comparable form
- †Eucastor
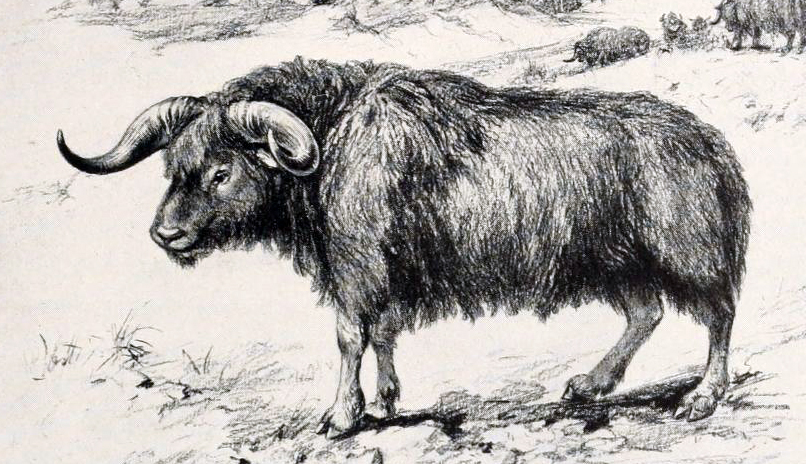
- Life restoration of the Pleistocene bovid Euceratherium, or the shrub ox. Robert Bruce Horsfall (1913).
  †Euceratherium – type locality for genus
  - †Euceratherium collinum – type locality for species
- Eucrassatella
  - †Eucrassatella semidentata
  - †Eucrassatella subgibbosus – type locality for species
- †Eucyon
  - †Eucyon davisi
- Euleptorhamphus
  - †Euleptorhamphus peronides
- Eumetopias
  - †Eumetopias jubata
- †Euoplocyon
  - †Euoplocyon brachygnathus
- Eupatagus
  - †Eupatagus stevensi
- Euphagus
  - †Euphagus cyanocephalus
- Eurytellina
  - †Eurytellina lorenzoensis
- Euscelis
  - †Euscelis palmeri – type locality for species
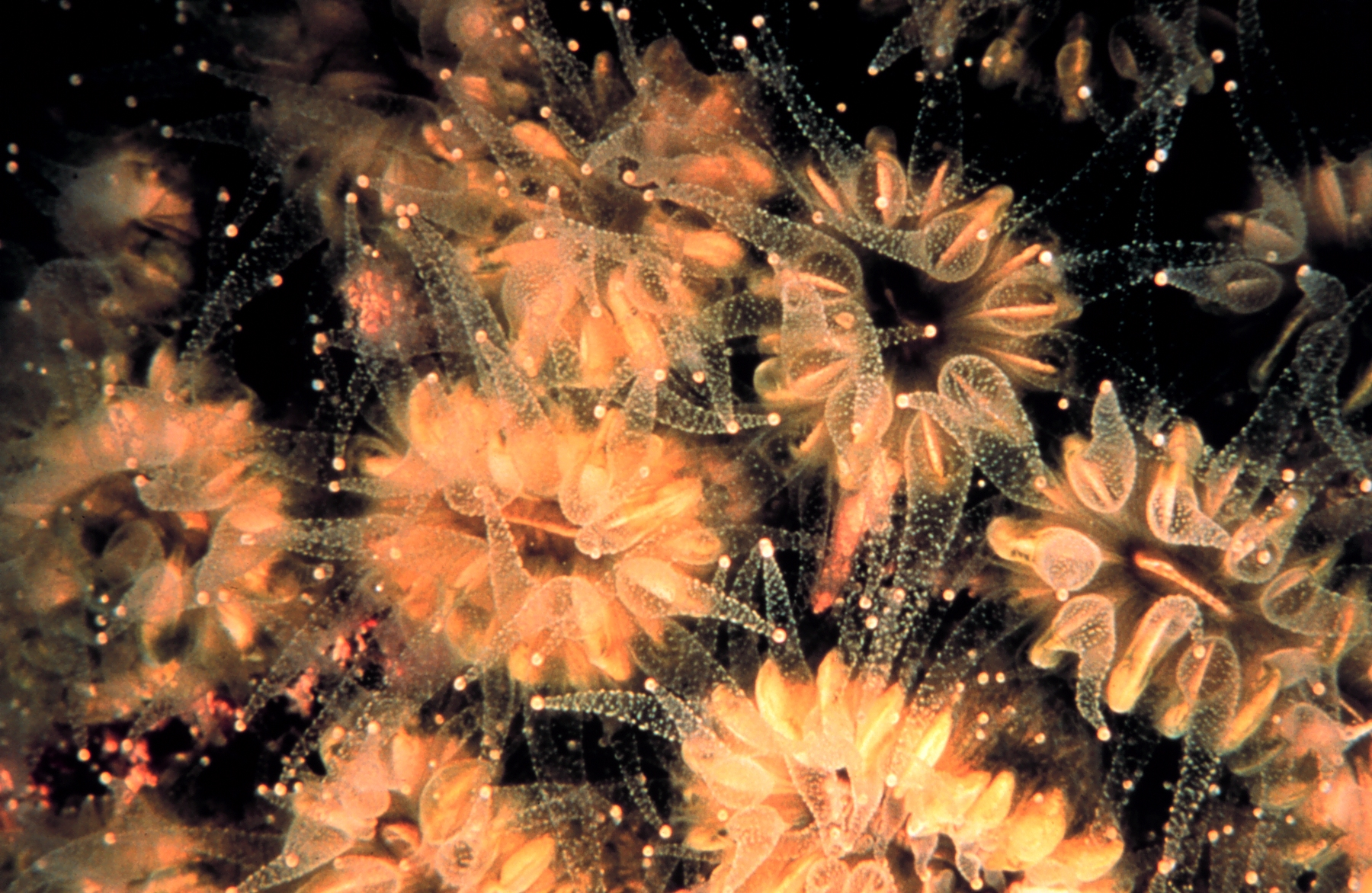
- A living Eusmilia stony coral
  Eusmilia
  - †Eusmilia carrizensis – type locality for species
- Euspira
  - †Euspira gesteri
  - †Euspira hornii
  - †Euspira lewisii
  - †Euspira muriciformis
  - †Euspira nuciformis
- †Euspirocromium
  - †Euspirocromium martinezensis
- †Euspirocrommium
  - †Euspirocrommium martinezensis
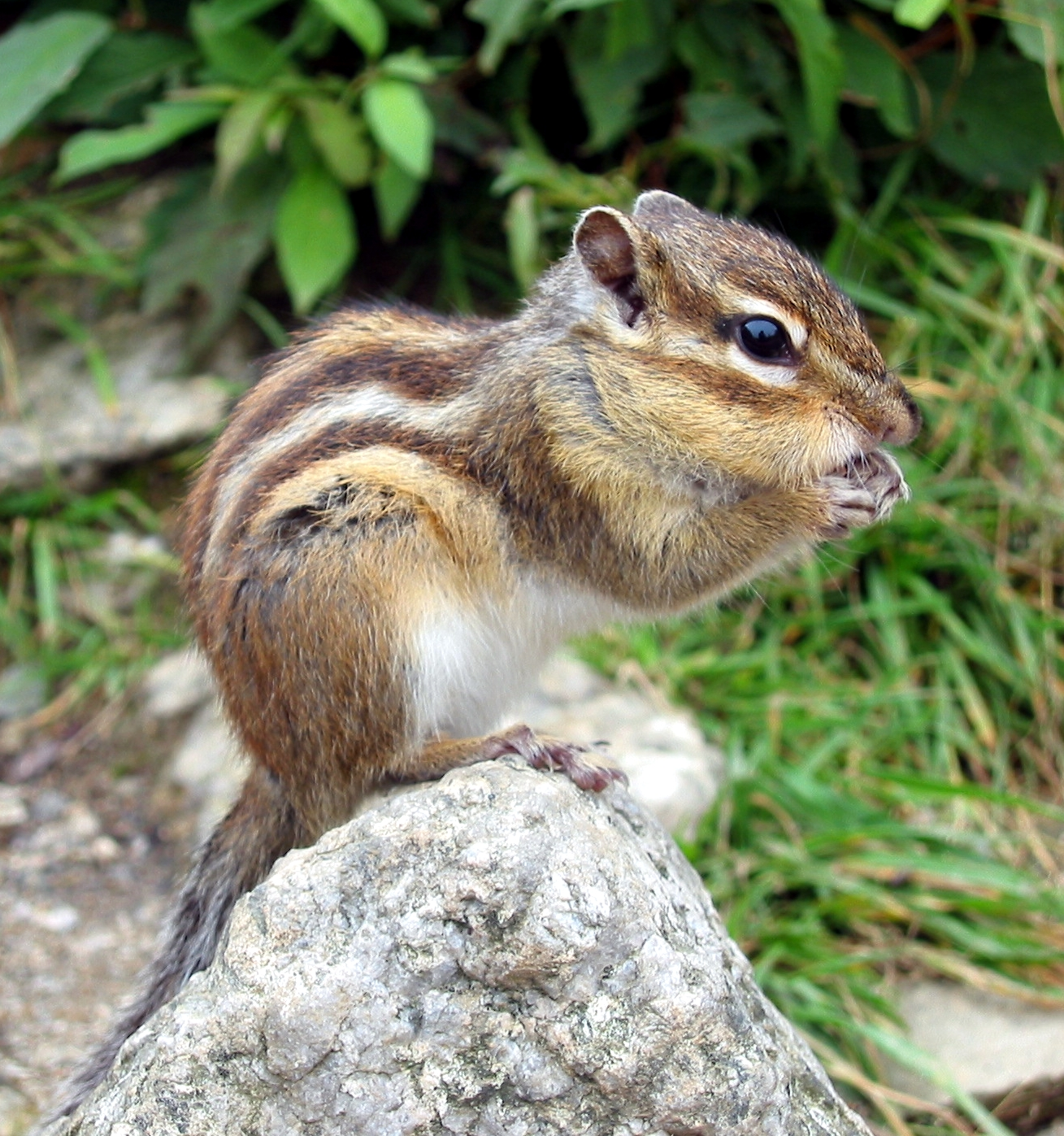
- A living Eutamias chipmunk
  Eutamias
- †Eutrephoceras
  - †Eutrephoceras hallidayi
  - †Eutrephoceras hannai
  - †Eutrephoceras marksi
  - †Eutrephoceras stephensoni – type locality for species
- Euvola
  - †Euvola keepi
  - †Euvola vogdesi
- †Evesthes
  - †Evesthes jordani
- †Exaeretoptera – report made of unidentified related form or using admittedly obsolete nomenclature
  - †Exaeretoptera fosteri – type locality for species
- †Exilia
  - †Exilia fausta
  - †Exilia talliaferroi – or unidentified comparable form

== F ==
- Falco
  - †Falco peregrinus
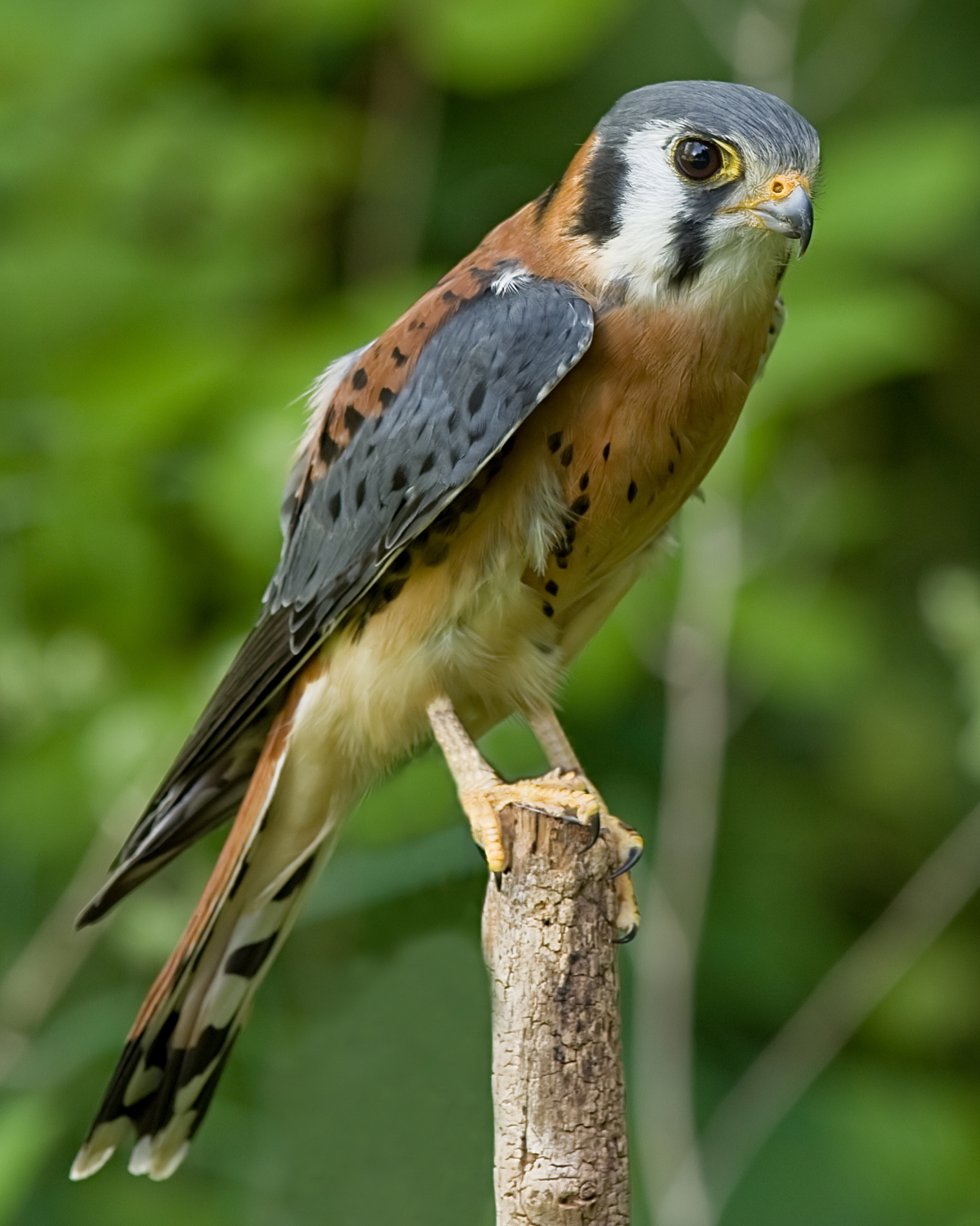
  - A living Falco sparverius, or American kestrel
    †Falco sparverius
- Falsifusus
- Farrea
  - †Farrea rugosa – type locality for species
- Fartulum
  - †Fartulum hemphilli
  - †Fartulum occidentale
- Felaniella
  - †Felaniella harfordi
- Felis
  - †Felis lacustris
  - †Felis rexroadensis
- †Ficopsis
  - †Ficopsis cooperiana
  - †Ficopsis crescentensis
  - †Ficopsis horni
  - †Ficopsis meganosensis – type locality for species
  - †Ficopsis redmondii
  - †Ficopsis remondi
  - †Ficopsis remondii
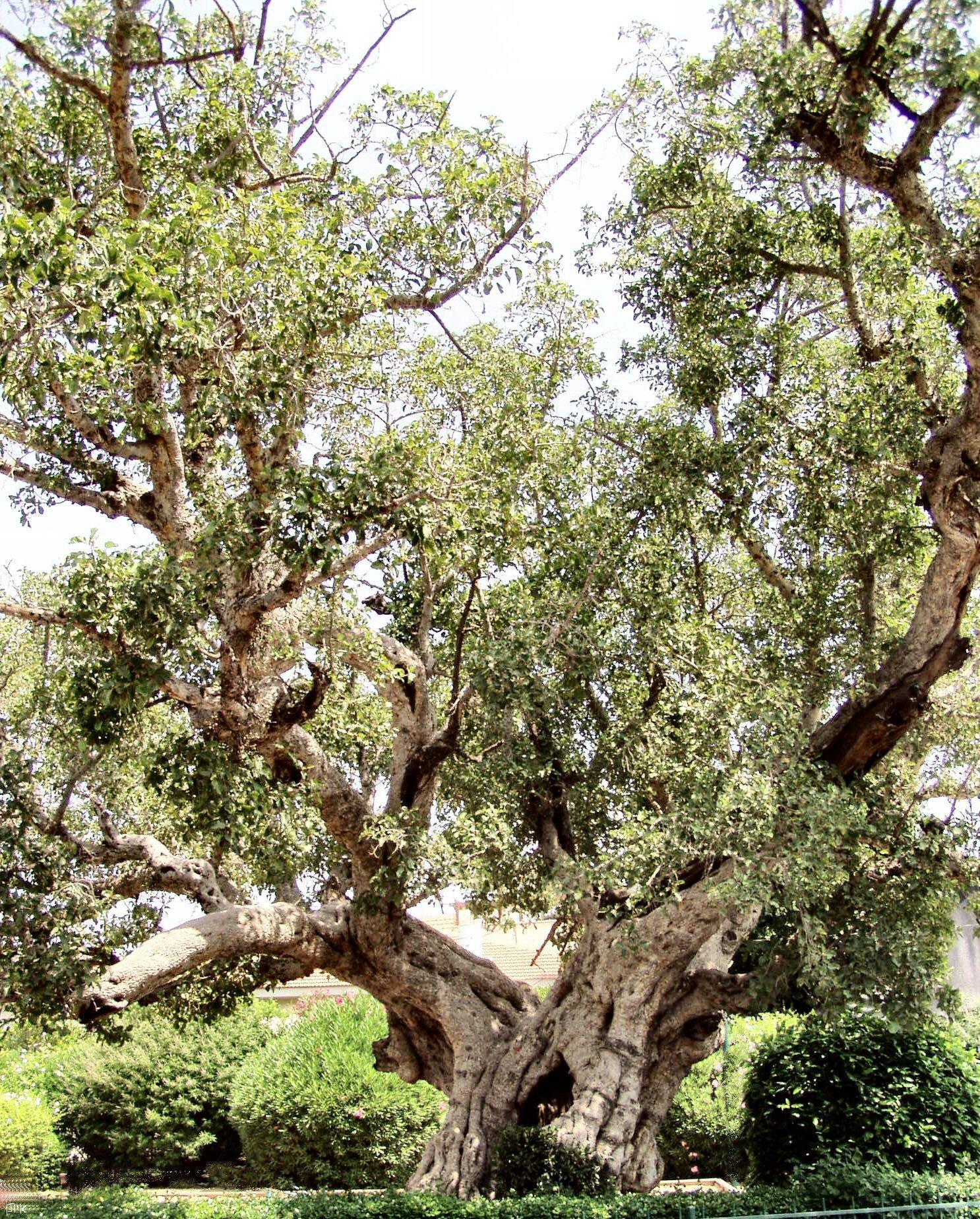
- A living Ficus, or fig tree
  Ficus
  - †Ficus decussata
  - †Ficus densifolia
  - †Ficus gesteri
  - †Ficus goshenensis
  - †Ficus modesta – or unidentified comparable form
  - †Ficus nodiferum
  - †Ficus ocoyana
  - †Ficus pyriformis
- Fimbria
  - †Fimbria pacifica
  - †Fimbria susanensis – type locality for species
- Fissurella
  - †Fissurella behri – or unidentified related form
  - †Fissurella volcano
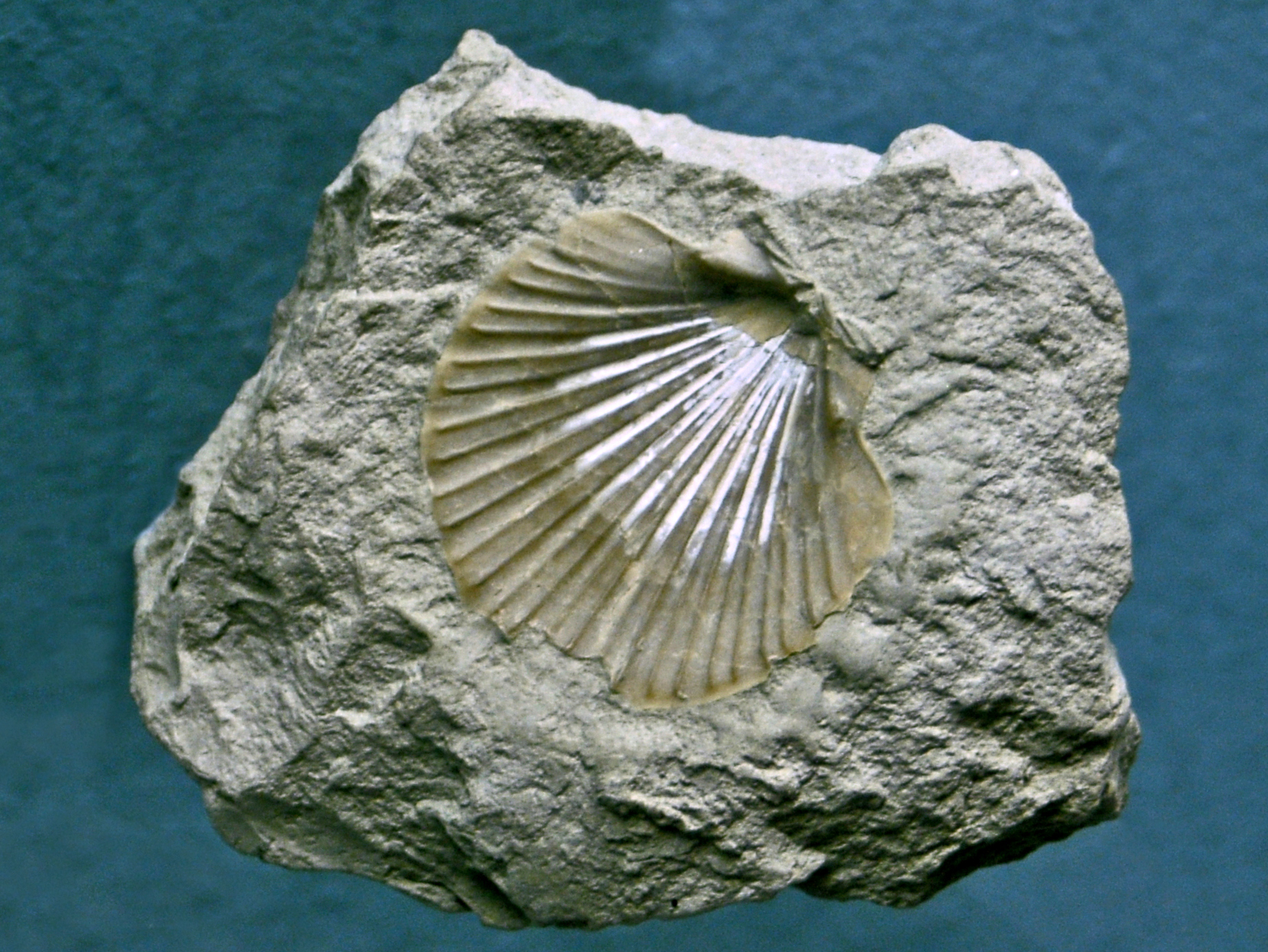
- Fossilized shell of the Oligocen-modern scallop Flabellipecten
  Flabellipecten
  - †Flabellipecten carrizoensis
  - †Flabellipecten stearnsii
- Flabellum
  - †Flabellum californicum
  - †Flabellum clarki – type locality for species
  - †Flabellum cuneiforme
  - †Flabellum stantoni
- †Forestiera
  - †Forestiera buchananensis
- †Forfex – type locality for genus
  - †Forfex hypuralis – type locality for species
- Forreria
  - †Forreria belchei
  - †Forreria belcheri
  - †Forreria carisaensis
  - †Forreria coalingensis
- †Fragilaria
  - †Fragilaria brevistriata
  - †Fragilaria construens
  - †Fragilaria pinnata
- Fratercula
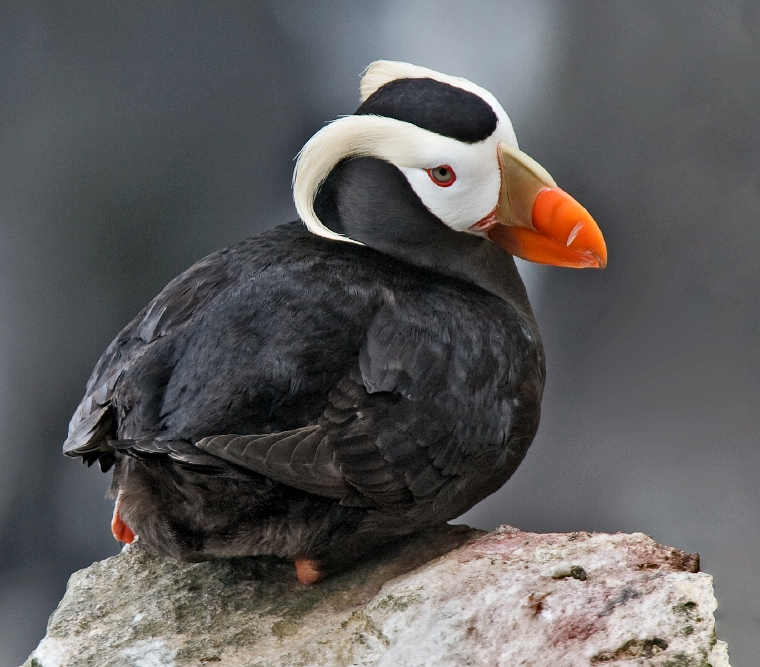
  - A living Fratercula cirrhata, or tufted puffin
    †Fratercula cirrhata
  - †Fratercula dowi – type locality for species
- †Fraxinus
  - †Fraxinus yubaensis – type locality for species
- Frondicularia
  - †Frondicularia tenuissima
- Fulgoraria
  - †Fulgoraria prevostiana
  - †Fulgoraria zinsmeisteri – type locality for species
- †Fulica
  - †Fulica americana
- Fulmarus
  - †Fulmarus glacialis
  - †Fulmarus griseus
  - †Fulmarus hammeri – type locality for species
  - †Fulmarus miocaenus – type locality for species
- Fusimitra – tentative report
  - †Fusimitra simplicissima – or unidentified comparable form
- Fusinus
  - †Fusinus barbarensis
  - †Fusinus calabasensis
  - †Fusinus chehalisensis – or unidentified comparable form
  - †Fusinus hecoxi
  - †Fusinus lincolnensis – or unidentified related form
  - †Fusinus luteopictus
  - †Fusinus meganosensis – type locality for species
  - †Fusinus merriami – or unidentified related form
  - †Fusinus simiensis

== G ==
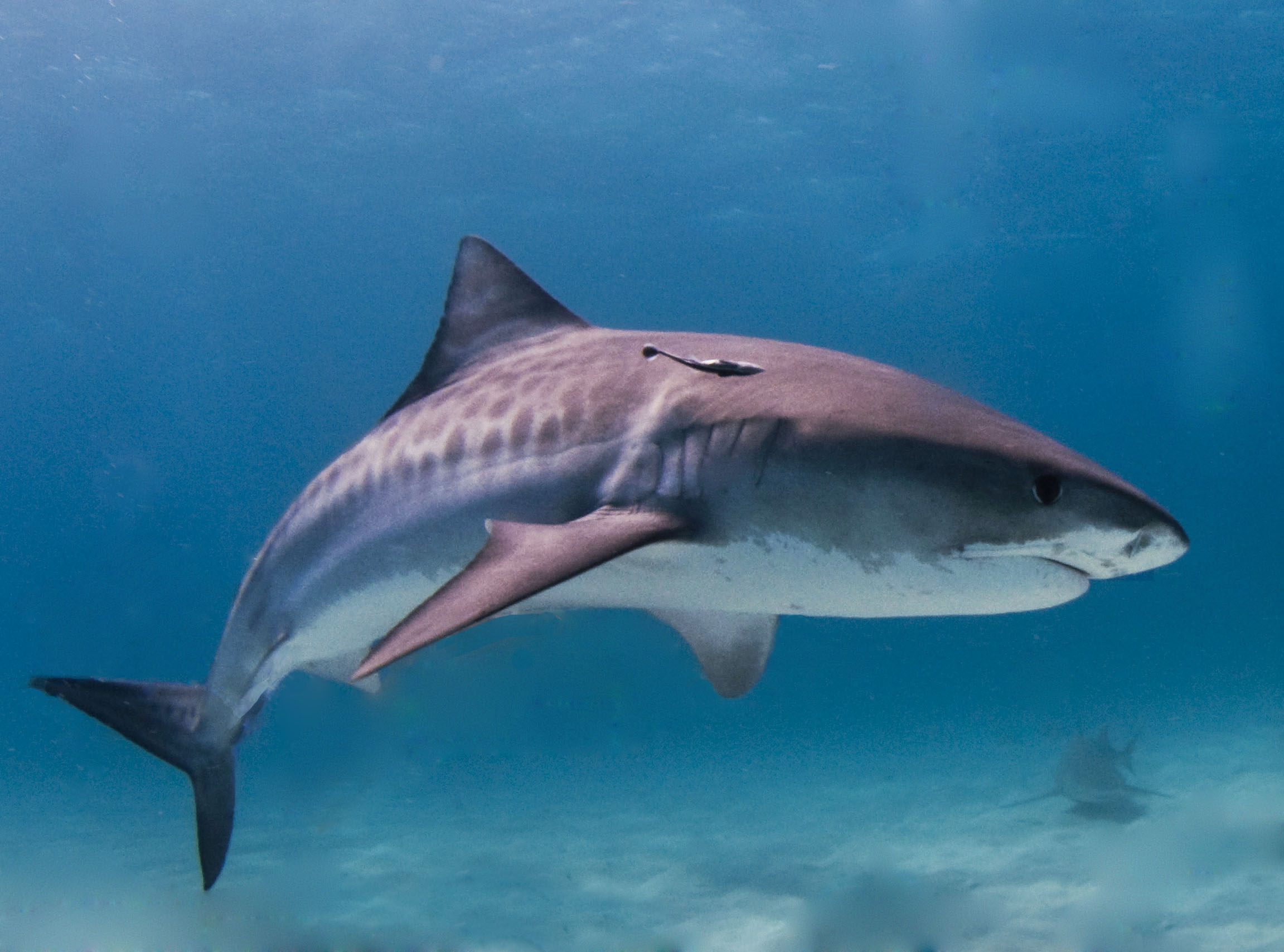
- A living Galeocerdo cuvier, or tiger shark
  Galeocerdo
  - †Galeocerdo aduncus
  - †Galeocerdo medius
- Galeodea
  - †Galeodea calfornica
  - †Galeodea carinata – or unidentified related form
  - †Galeodea meganosensis
  - †Galeodea petersoni – or unidentified related form
  - †Galeodea susanae
  - †Galeodea sutterensis
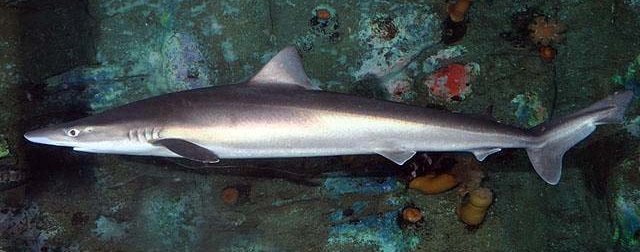
- A living Galeorhinus galeus school shark
  Galeorhinus
  - †Galeorhinus hannibali
  - †Galeorhinus latus – or unidentified comparable form
  - †Galeorhinus zopterus
- †Ganolytes
  - †Ganolytes aratus
  - †Ganolytes cameo
  - †Ganolytes clepsydra – type locality for species
- Gari
  - †Gari californica
  - †Gari diegoensis – or unidentified comparable form
  - †Gari furcata
  - †Gari hornii
  - †Gari texta
- †Gasterosternus
  - †Gasterosternus aculeatus
- Gasterosteus
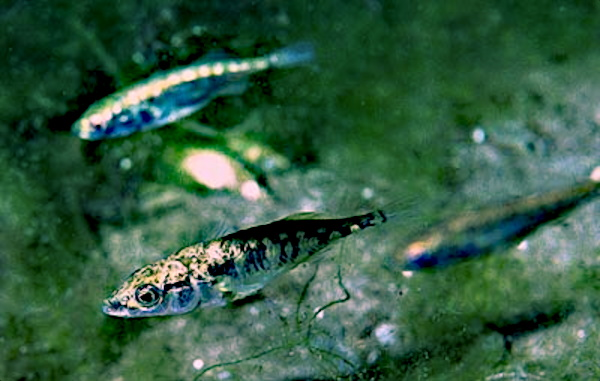
  - A school of living Gasterosteus aculeatus, or three-spined stickleback
    †Gasterosteus aculeatus
- Gastrochaena
  - †Gastrochaena dubitata – tentative report
- Gaudryina
  - †Gaudryina laevigata
  - †Gaudryina triangularis – or unidentified comparable form
- Gavia
  - †Gavia arctica
  - †Gavia brodkorbi – type locality for species
  - †Gavia concinna
  - †Gavia howardae – type locality for species
  - †Gavia immer
  - †Gavia pacifica
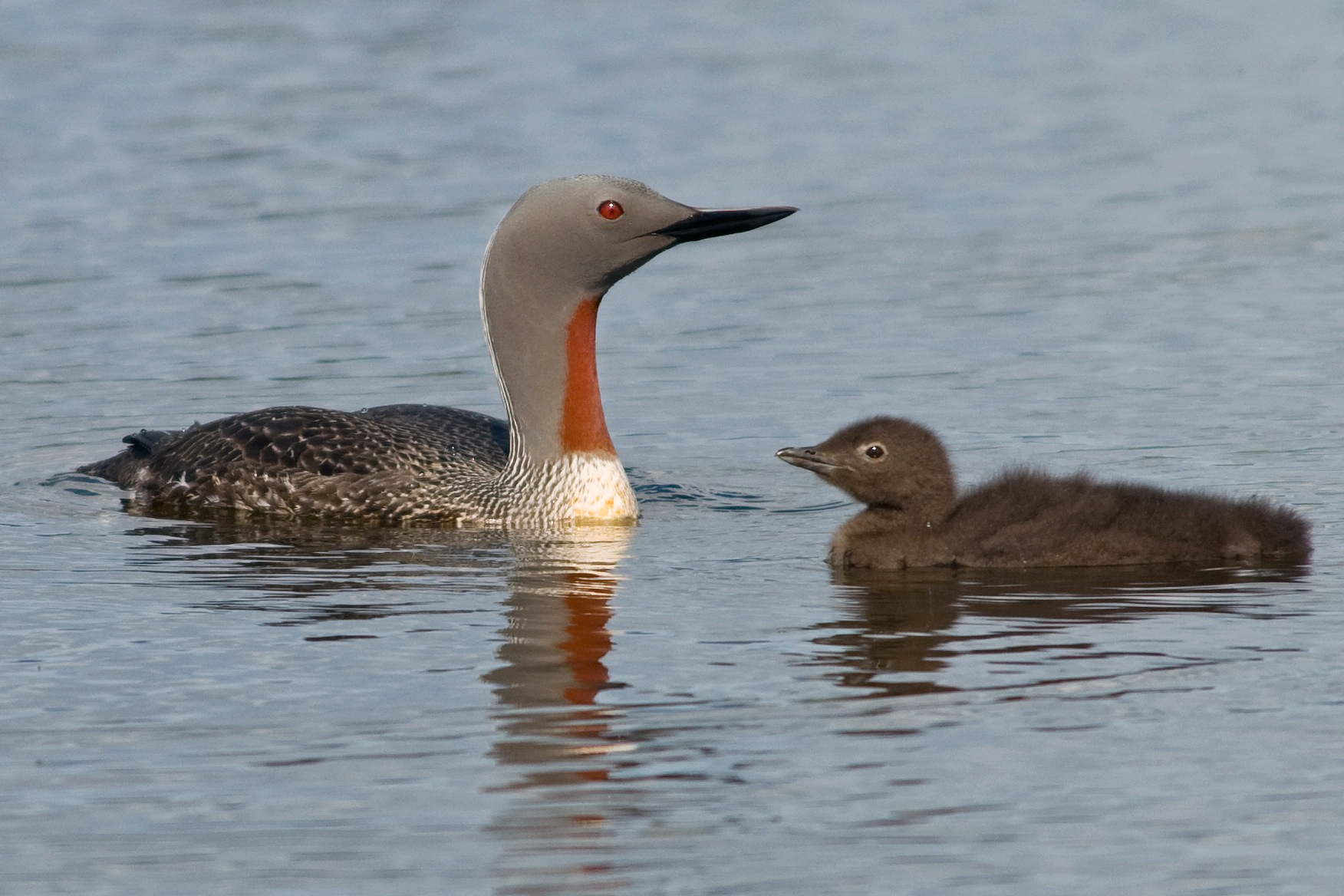
  - Living adult and young Gavia stellata, or red-throated loon
    †Gavia stellata
- †Gemelliporella – tentative report
  - †Gemelliporella punctata – or unidentified related form
- Gemmula
  - †Gemmula diabloensis – type locality for species
  - †Gemmula wattsi
- Genota
  - †Genota keepi
- Genyonemus
  - †Genyonemus lineatus
- Geochelone
- †Geococcyx
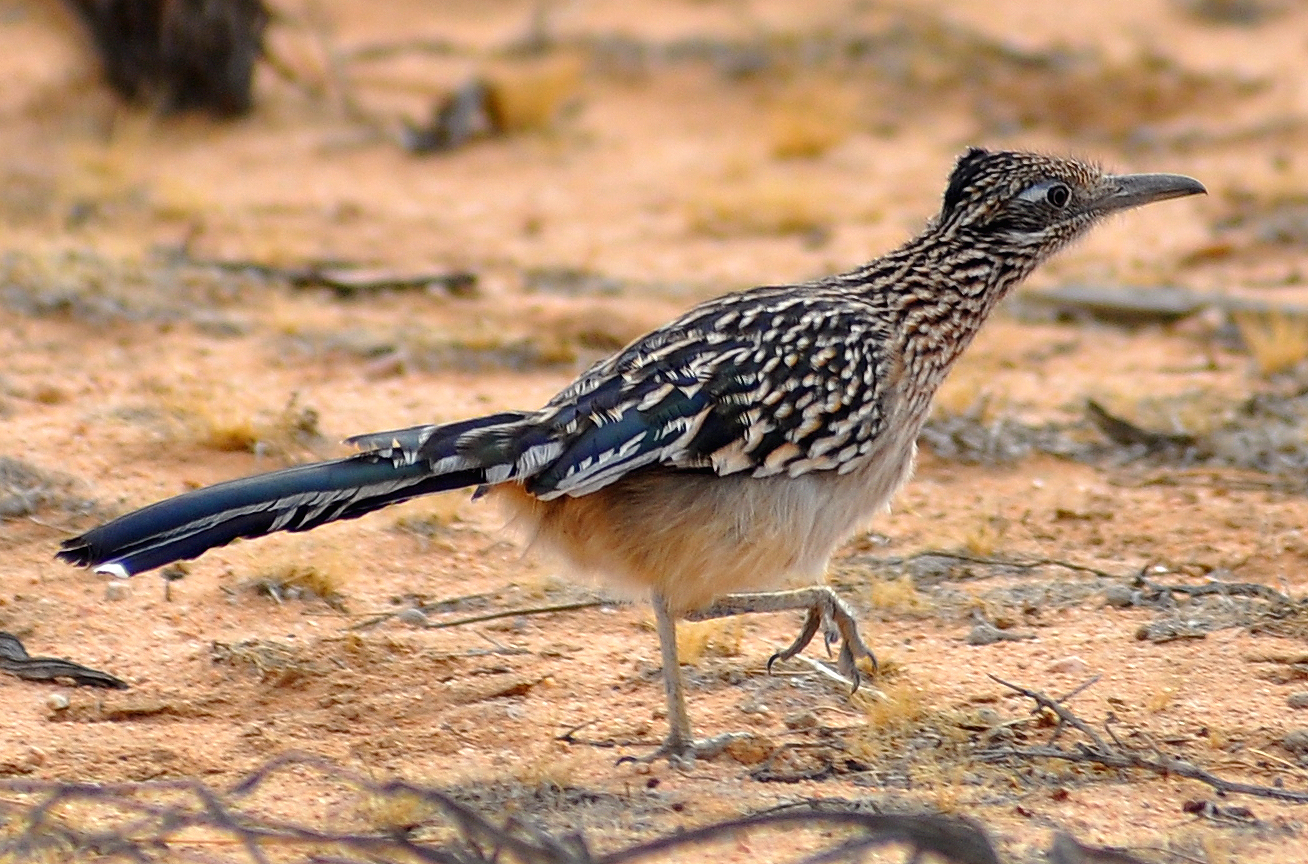
  - A living Geococcyx californianus, or greater roadrunner
    †Geococcyx californianus
- Geomys
- Geranoaetus
- Gerrhonotus
- Gibbolucina
  - †Gibbolucina gyrata
  - †Gibbolucina turneri
- †Gila – tentative report
- †Gilbertia
- †Gisortia
  - †Gisortia clarki
- Glans
  - †Glans carpenteri
- Glaucidium
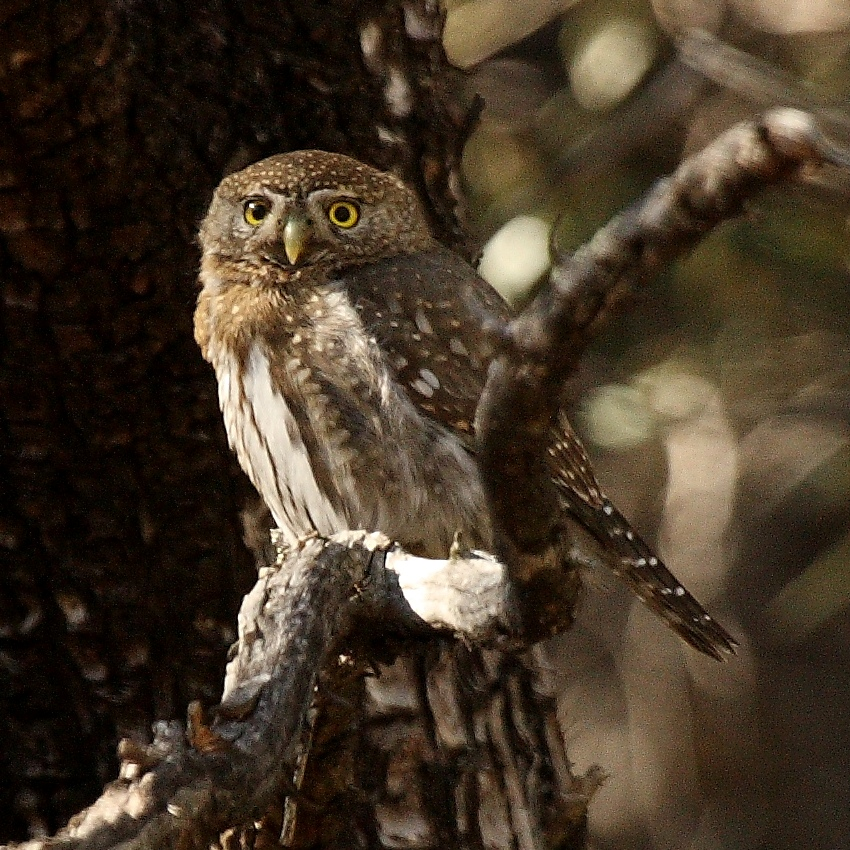
  - A living Glaucidium gnoma, or mountain pygmy owl
    †Glaucidium gnoma
- Glebocarcinus
  - †Glebocarcinus amphioetus
- Globigerina
  - †Globigerina bulloides
  - †Globigerina decepta
  - †Globigerina ouachitaensis
  - †Globigerina triloculinoides
- Globorotalia
  - †Globorotalia crassata
- Globularia
  - †Globularia hannabali – or unidentified comparable form
- Glossus
  - †Glossus susukii – type locality for species
- Glycimeris
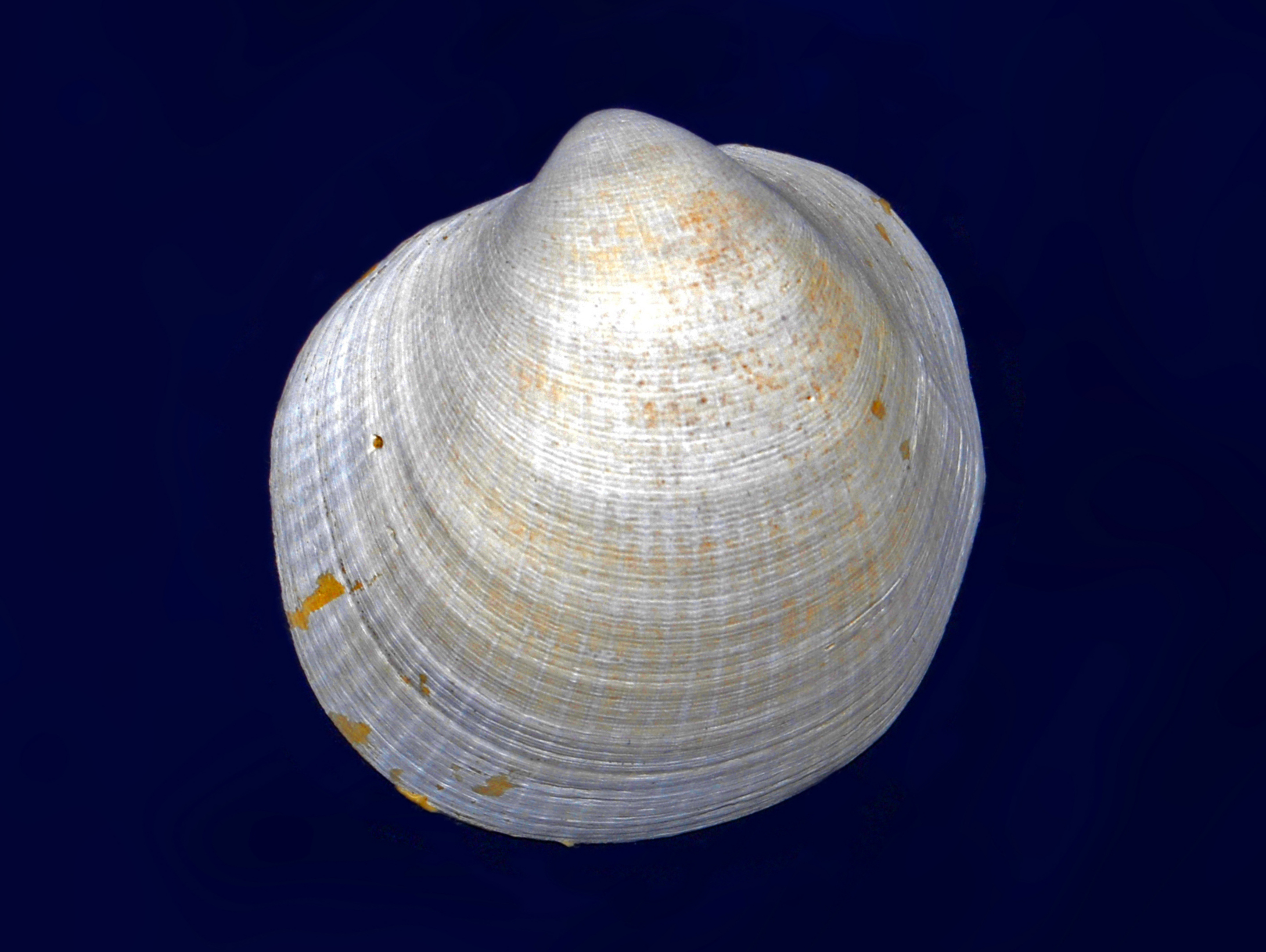
- Fossilized shell of a Glycymeris, or bittersweet clam
  Glycymeris
  - †Glycymeris branneri
  - †Glycymeris gigantea
  - †Glycymeris major
  - †Glycymeris perrini
  - †Glycymeris rosecanyonensis
  - †Glycymeris sagittata
  - †Glycymeris septentrionalis
  - †Glycymeris veatchi
  - †Glycymeris veatchii
- Glyptoactis
  - †Glyptoactis domenginica
  - †Glyptoactis keenae
  - †Glyptoactis mcmasteri
  - †Glyptoactis sandiegoensis
- Glyptostrobus
  - †Glyptostrobus oregonensis
- †Gnathamitermes
  - †Gnathamitermes rousei – type locality for species
- Gnathotermes
- †Golerdelphys – type locality for genus
  - †Golerdelphys stocki – type locality for species
- †Goleremys – type locality for genus
  - †Goleremys mckennai – type locality for species
- †Gomphotaria – type locality for genus
  - †Gomphotaria pugnax – type locality for species
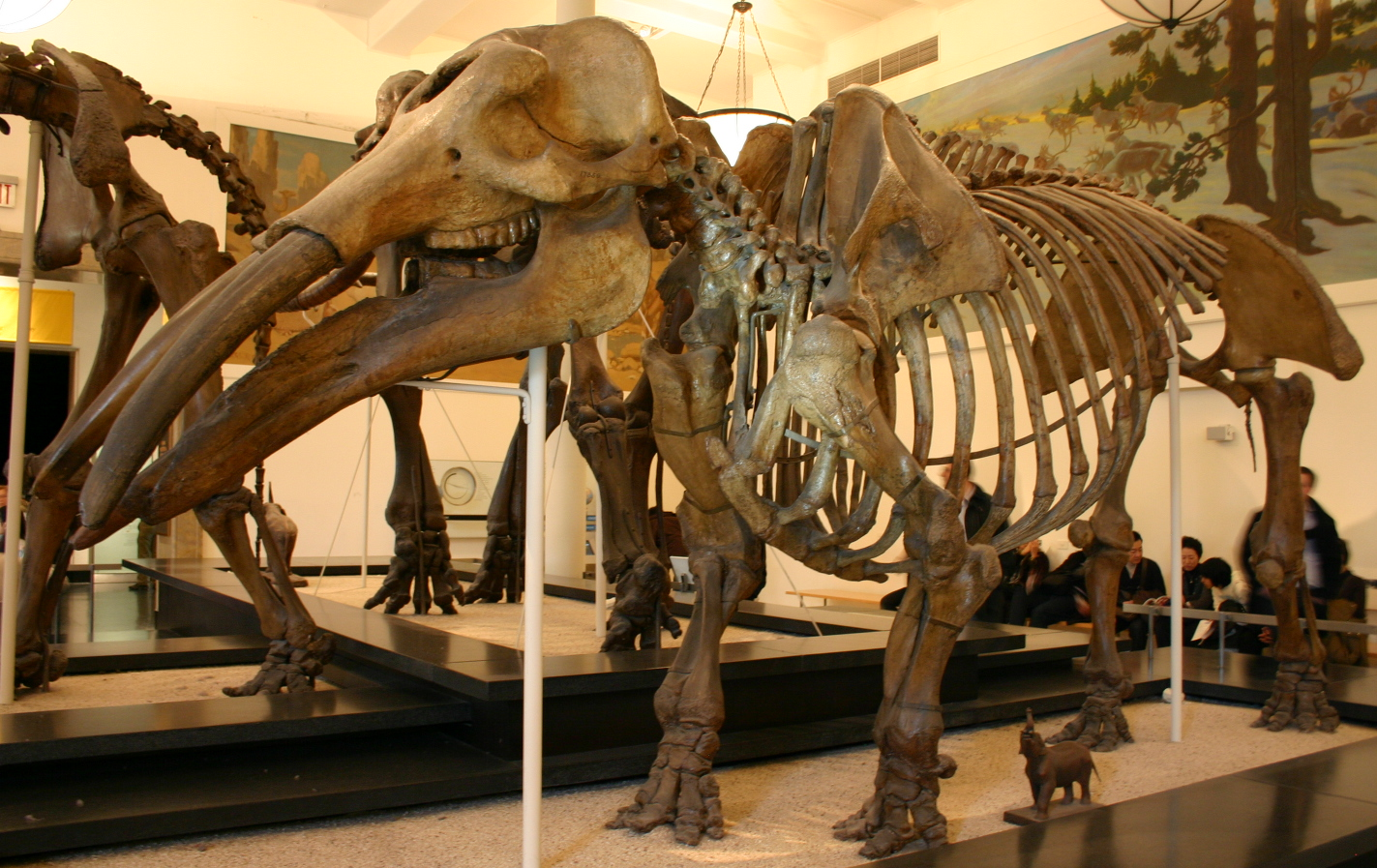
- Mounted fossilized skeleton of the Miocene-Pleistocene elephant relative Gomphotherium
  †Gomphotherium
  - †Gomphotherium obscurum
- †Goniobasis – tentative report
- Goniopora
  - †Goniopora vaughani – type locality for species
- Gopherus
  - †Gopherus agassizi
  - †Gopherus agassizii
  - †Gopherus mohavetus – type locality for species
- †Gordonia
  - †Gordonia egregia
- Granulina
  - †Granulina margaritula
- †Gripholagomys – tentative report
- †Griphomys
  - †Griphomys alecer – type locality for species
  - †Griphomys toltecus – type locality for species
- Gymnogyps
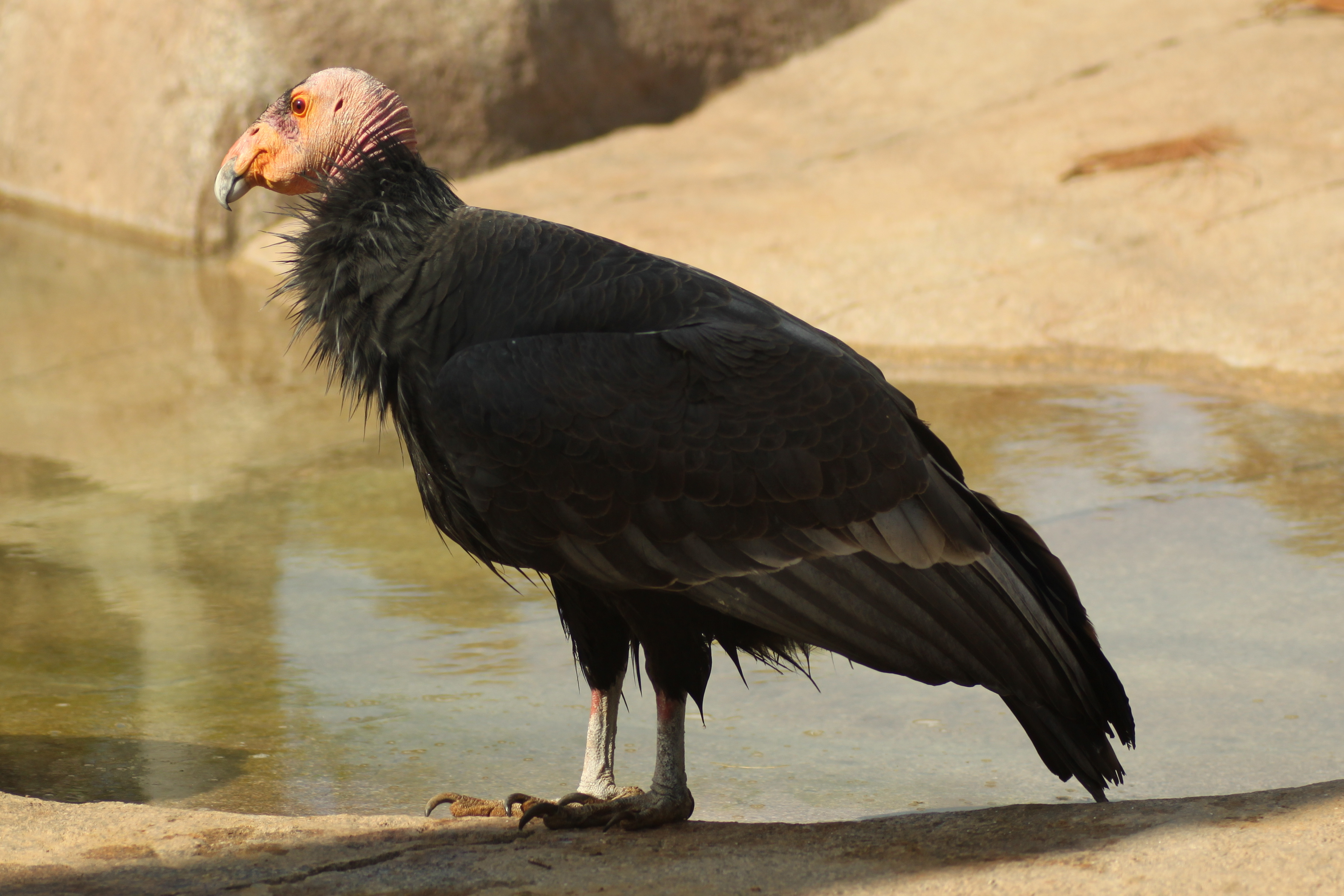
  - A living Gymnogyps californianus, or California condor
    †Gymnogyps californianus – type locality for species
- Gyroidina
  - †Gyroidina condoni
  - †Gyroidina orbicularis
  - †Gyroidina planulata
  - †Gyroidina soldanii

== H ==
- †Hadrogyps – type locality for genus
  - †Hadrogyps aigialeus – type locality for species
- Haliaeetus
  - †Haliaeetus leucocephalus
- †Haliaetus
  - †Haliaetus leucocephalus
- †Halonanus
  - †Halonanus horni
- †Hamamelites
  - †Hamamelites voyana
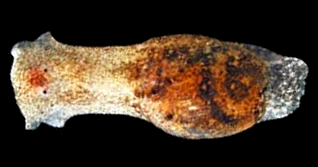
- A living Haminoea bubble sea snail
  Haminoea
  - †Haminoea postangulata – type locality for species
  - †Haminoea vesicula
- Hanetia
  - †Hanetia elegans
- †Hantkenina
  - †Hantkenina alabamensis
- Haplophragmoides
  - †Haplophragmoides flagleri
  - †Haplophragmoides obliquicameratus
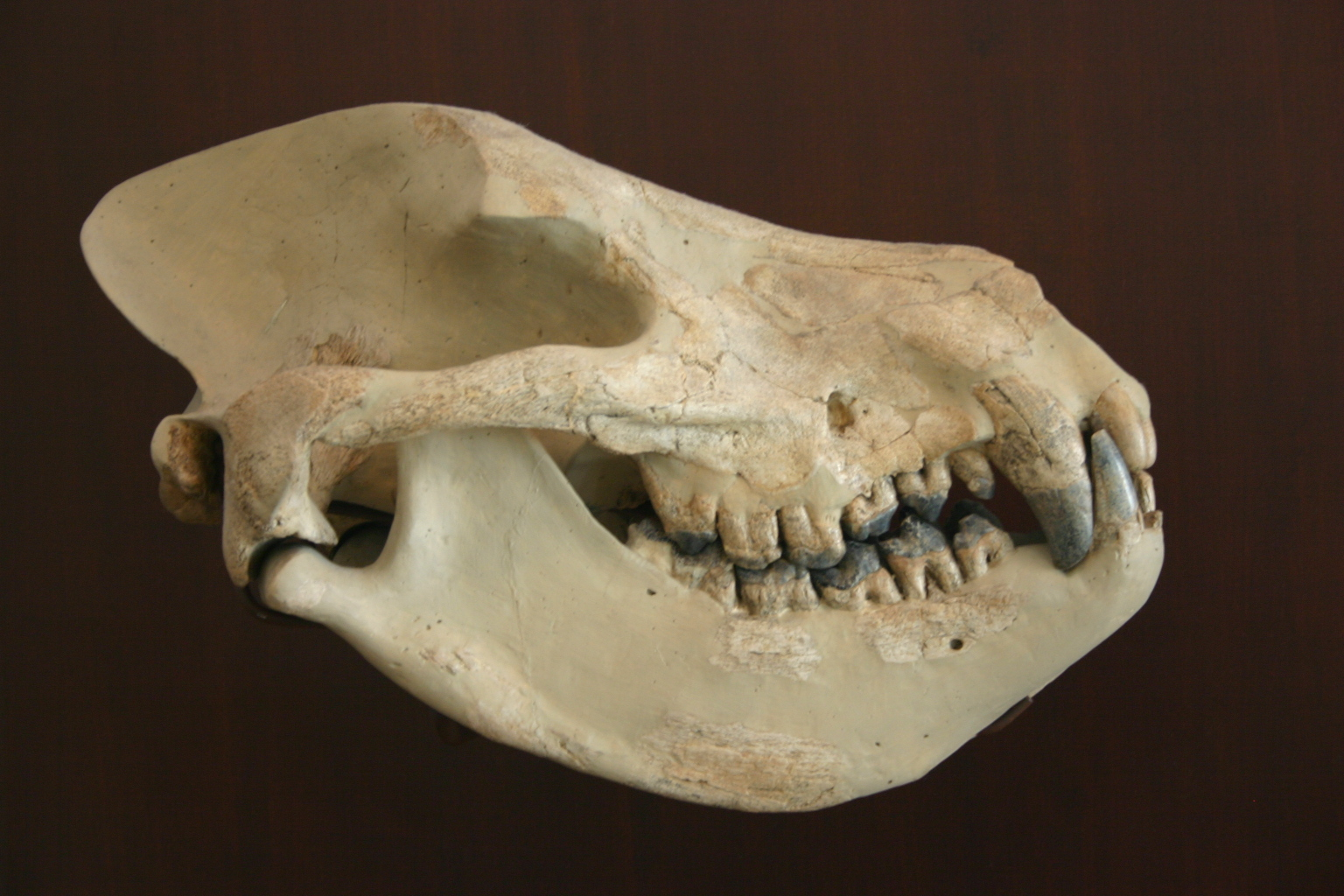
- Fossilized skull of the mesonychian mammal Harpagolestes
  †Harpagolestes – or unidentified comparable form
- †Harrymys
  - †Harrymys magnus
- Harvella
  - †Harvella elegans
- †Hastigerinella
  - †Hastigerinella eocenica
- †Hayia – type locality for genus
  - †Hayia daulica – type locality for species
- †Heliscomys
  - †Heliscomys walshi – type locality for species
- Heloderma
- †Hemiacodon
  - †Hemiacodon gracilis
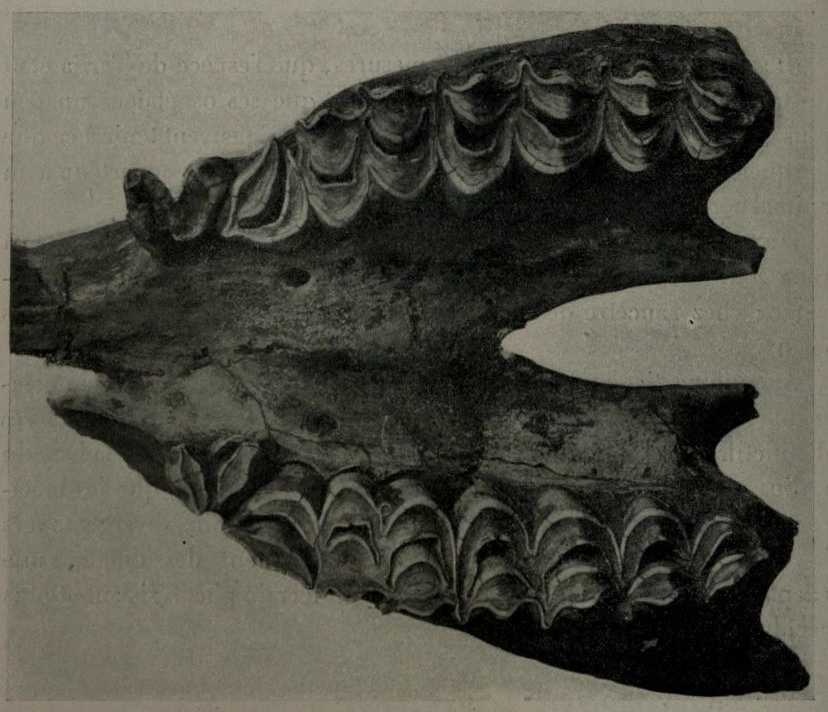
- Fossilized lower jaw of the Miocene-Pleistocene llama relative Hemiauchenia
  †Hemiauchenia
  - †Hemiauchenia macrocephala
- Hemipristis
  - †Hemipristis heteropleurus
  - †Hemipristis serra
- Hemitelia
  - †Hemitelia pinnata – type locality for species
- Hemitoma
  - †Hemitoma cantonensis – type locality for species
- †Hercoglossa
  - †Hercoglossa merriami – type locality for species
  - †Hercoglossa simiensis – type locality for species
- Here
  - †Here excavata
- †Herpetocetus
  - †Herpetocetus bramblei – type locality for species
  - †Herpetocetus morrowi – type locality for species
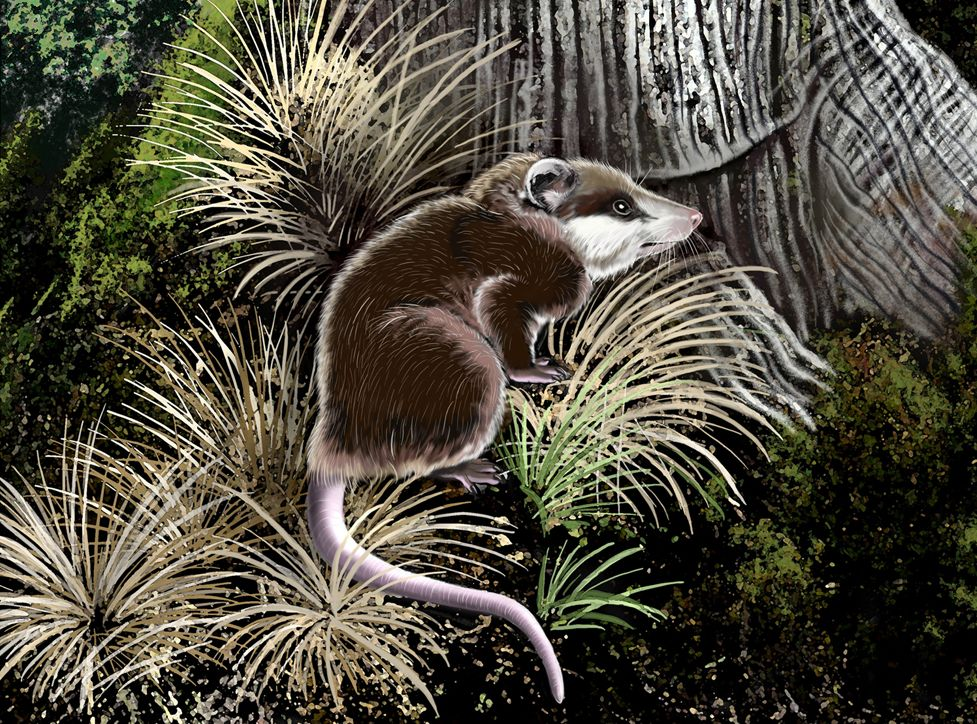
- Life restoration of the Eocene-Miocene mammal Herpetotherium
  †Herpetotherium
  - †Herpetotherium innominatum – or unidentified comparable form
  - †Herpetotherium knighti – or unidentified comparable form
  - †Herpetotherium valens
- †Hesperaletes
  - †Hesperaletes borineyi – type locality for species
  - †Hesperaletes walshi – type locality for species
- Hespererato
  - †Hespererato columbella
- †Hesperhys
  - †Hesperhys vagrans
- †Hesperocamelus – or unidentified comparable form
- †Hesperocetus – type locality for genus
  - †Hesperocetus californicus – type locality for species
- †Hesperolagomys
- Hesperomys
  - †Hesperomys nematodon
- †Hesperotestudo
  - †Hesperotestudo orthopygia
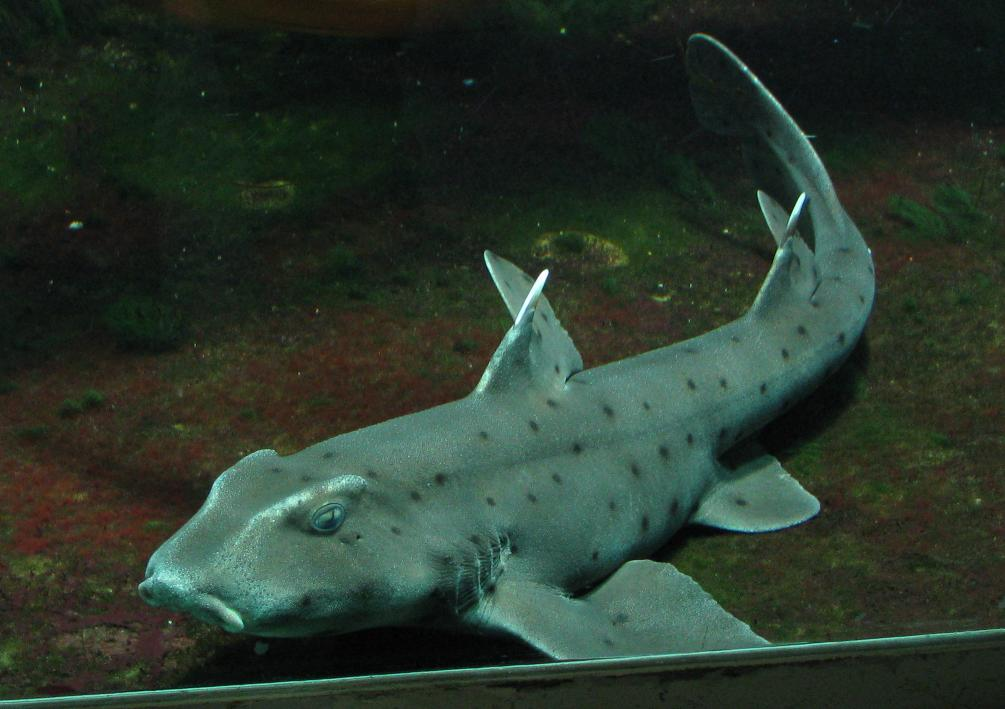
- A living Heterodontus, or bullhead shark
  Heterodontus
  - †Heterodontus francisi – or unidentified comparable form
- †Heteropliohippus
  - †Heteropliohippus hulberti – type locality for species
- Heterosilpha
  - †Heterosilpha ramosa
- Heteroterma
  - †Heteroterma striata
  - †Heteroterma trochoidea
- †Hexacanthus
- Hexagrammos
  - †Hexagrammos achrestus – type locality for species
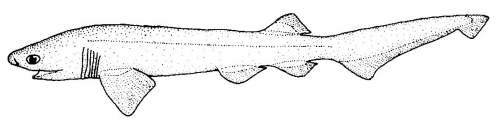
- Illustration of a living Hexanchus, or sixgill shark
  Hexanchus
  - †Hexanchus aus
  - †Hexanchus bus
- Hiatella
  - †Hiatella arctica
- †Hilgardia – tentative report
  - †Hilgardia parkei
- †Hiltonius
  - †Hiltonius australis – type locality for species
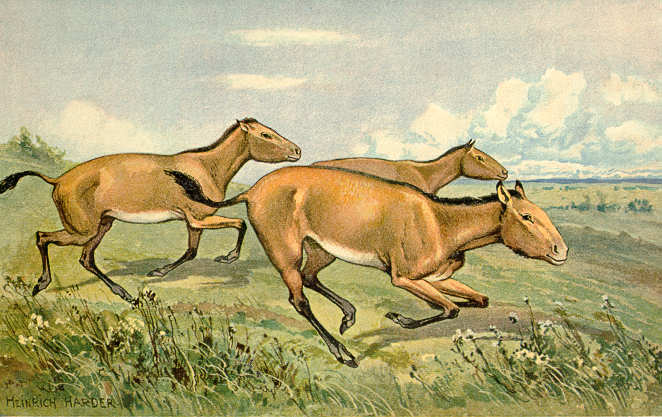
- Life restoration of a herd of the Miocene-Pleistocene horse Hipparion. Heinrich Harder (1920).
  †Hipparion
  - †Hipparion forcei
  - †Hipparion tehonense
- †Hippidion
- †Hippipeda
- †Hippnoe
  - †Hippnoe californica
- Hipponix
  - †Hipponix craniodes
  - †Hipponix tumens
- †Hipponoe
  - †Hipponoe californica
- †Hippotherium
- Histrionicus
  - †Histrionicus histrionicus – tentative report
- Hodomys
- Homalopoma
  - †Homalopoma carpenteri
  - †Homalopoma domenginensis
  - †Homalopoma pacifica
  - †Homalopoma wattsi
- Homo
  - †Homo sapiens
- †Homomya
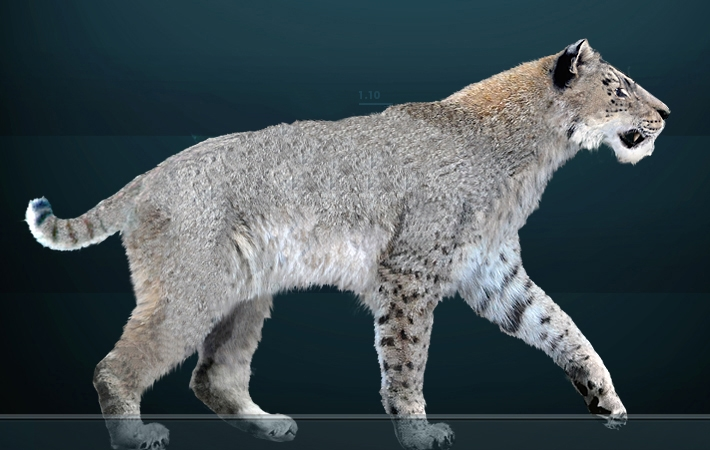
- Restoration of Pliocene-Pleistocene Homotherium, or scimitar cat
  †Homotherium
  - †Homotherium serum – or unidentified comparable form
- †Hopkinsina
  - †Hopkinsina compressa
- †Hoplictis
  - †Hoplictis grangerensis – or unidentified comparable form
- †Hoplophoneus
  - †Hoplophoneus cerebralis
- †Humilaria
  - †Humilaria perlaminosa
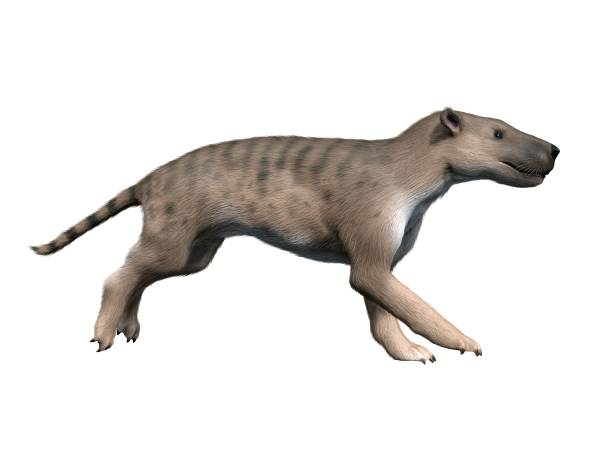
- Life restoration of the Eocene-Miocene creodont mammal Hyaenodon
  †Hyaenodon
  - †Hyaenodon venturae
  - †Hyaenodon vetus – type locality for species
- Hyalina
  - †Hyalina californica
- †Hyalinonetrion
  - †Hyalinonetrion clavatum
- Hydrangea
  - †Hydrangea californica – type locality for species
- †Hydrodamalis
  - †Hydrodamalis cuestae – type locality for species
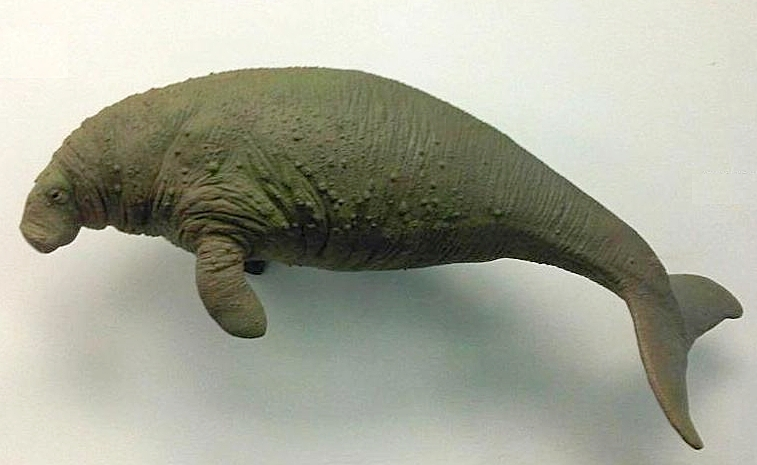
  - Restorative model of the Pleistocene-Holocene manatee relative Hydrodamalis gigas, or Steller's sea cow
    †Hydrodamalis gigas
- Hydrophilus
- Hyla
- †Hyopsodus – or unidentified comparable form
- †Hyperbaena
  - †Hyperbaena diforma
- †Hypertragulus
  - †Hypertragulus calcaratus
  - †Hypertragulus hesperius
- †Hypohippus
- †Hypolagus
  - †Hypolagus edensis – type locality for species
  - †Hypolagus fontinalis
  - †Hypolagus furlongi
  - †Hypolagus gidleyi
  - †Hypolagus parviplicatus – or unidentified comparable form
  - †Hypolagus tedfordi
  - †Hypolagus vetus
- †Hyrachyus

== I ==
- †Ibarus
  - †Ibarus ignotus – or unidentified comparable form
- †Idiophyseter – type locality for genus
  - †Idiophyseter merriami – type locality for species
- †Ignacius
  - †Ignacius frugivorus
- †Ilingoceros
- †Imagotaria – type locality for genus
  - †Imagotaria downsi – type locality for species
- †Indarctos
- †Inga
  - †Inga ionensis – type locality for species
- †Interchlamys
  - †Interchlamys interlineata – or unidentified comparable form
- †Ioscion
  - †Ioscion morgani
- Ischnochiton
  - †Ischnochiton sanctaemonicae
- †Ischyrocyon
  - †Ischyrocyon gidleyi
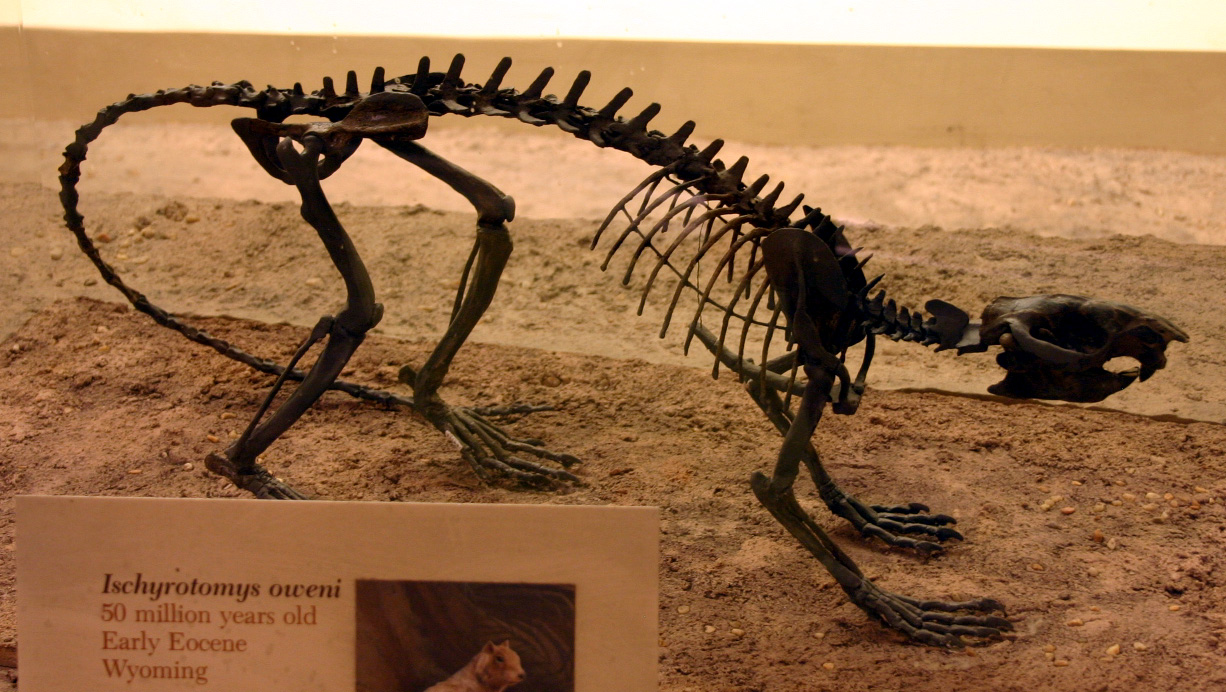
- Mounted fossilized skeleton of the Eocene-Oligocene rodent Ischyromys
  †Ischyromys
- Iselica
  - †Iselica fenestrata
- Isognomon
  - †Isognomon clarki
- Isurus
  - †Isurus aus
  - †Isurus benedini
  - †Isurus bus
  - †Isurus oxyrhynchus
  - †Isurus oxyrinchus
  - †Isurus planus

== J ==
- †Jacobsomys
  - †Jacobsomys dailyi – type locality for species
- †Jamilcotatus
  - †Jamilcotatus boreios – type locality for species
- Jaton
  - †Jaton eldridgei
  - †Jaton festivus
- †Johannsenomyia
  - †Johannsenomyia hotchkissae – type locality for species
- Jouannetia
- Juliacorbula
  - †Juliacorbula luteola
- †Julus
  - †Julus cavicola – type locality for species
  - †Julus occidentalis – type locality for species
- †Jumaraina
  - †Jumaraina rinconensis – type locality for species
- †Juncus
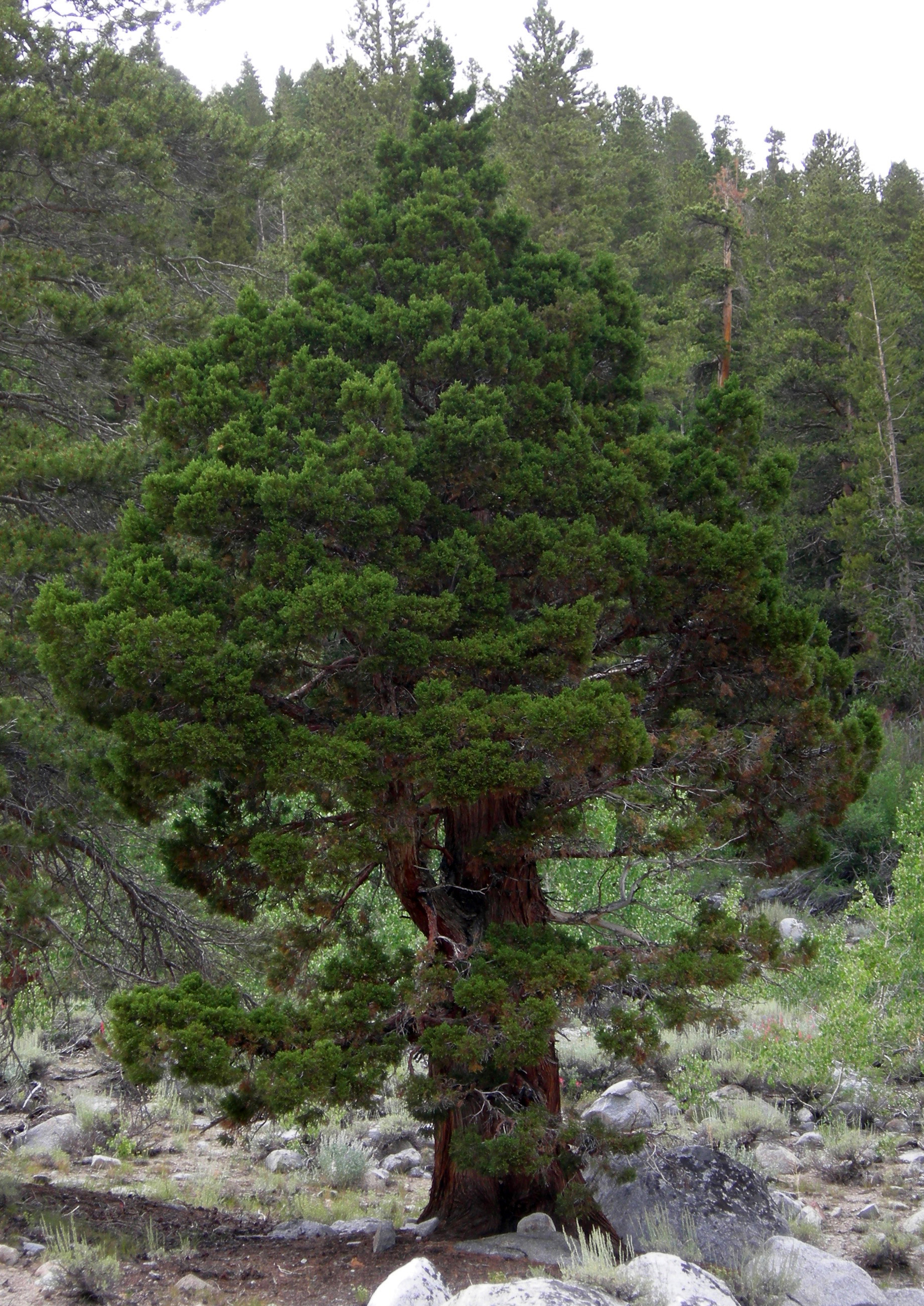
- A living Juniperus, or juniper tree
  Juniperus

== K ==
- Kalolophus
  - †Kalolophus antillarum – or unidentified comparable form
- †Kampholophos – type locality for genus
  - †Kampholophos serrulus – type locality for species
- Karreriella
  - †Karreriella barbati
  - †Karreriella mediaaquaensis
- Katherinella
- Kelletia
  - †Kelletia kelletii
- Kellia
  - †Kellia suborbicularis
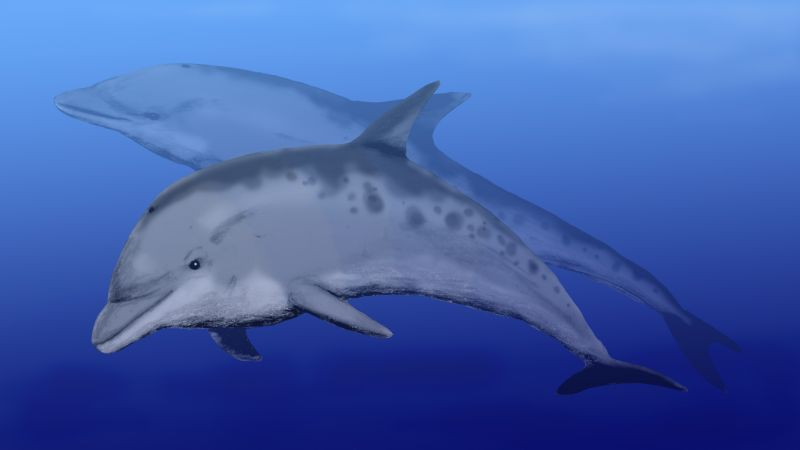
- Life restoration of the Oligocene-Miocene dolphin Kentriodon
  †Kentriodon – type locality for genus
  - †Kentriodon obscurus – type locality for species
- †Keteleeria
  - †Keteleeria heterophylloides
- †Kewia – tentative report
  - †Kewia fairbanksi – or unidentified comparable form
- †Kingena
  - †Kingena simiensis
- †Kirkomys – or unidentified comparable form
- †Knightomys – or unidentified comparable form
- †Kummelonautilus
- Kurtiella
  - †Kurtiella tumida
- Kurtzia
  - †Kurtzia arteaga
- Kurtziella
  - †Kurtziella plumbea

== L ==
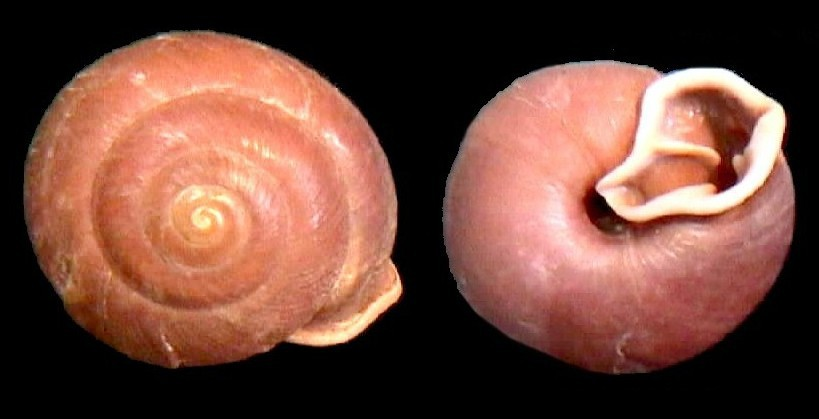
- Shell in multiple views of a Labyrinthus land snail
  †Labyrinthus
  - †Labyrinthus obtusus – type locality for species
- Lacuna
  - †Lacuna carinata
  - †Lacuna porrecta
  - †Lacuna solidula
  - †Lacuna unifasciata
- †Lacunaria
  - †Lacunaria striata – or unidentified related form
- Laevicardium
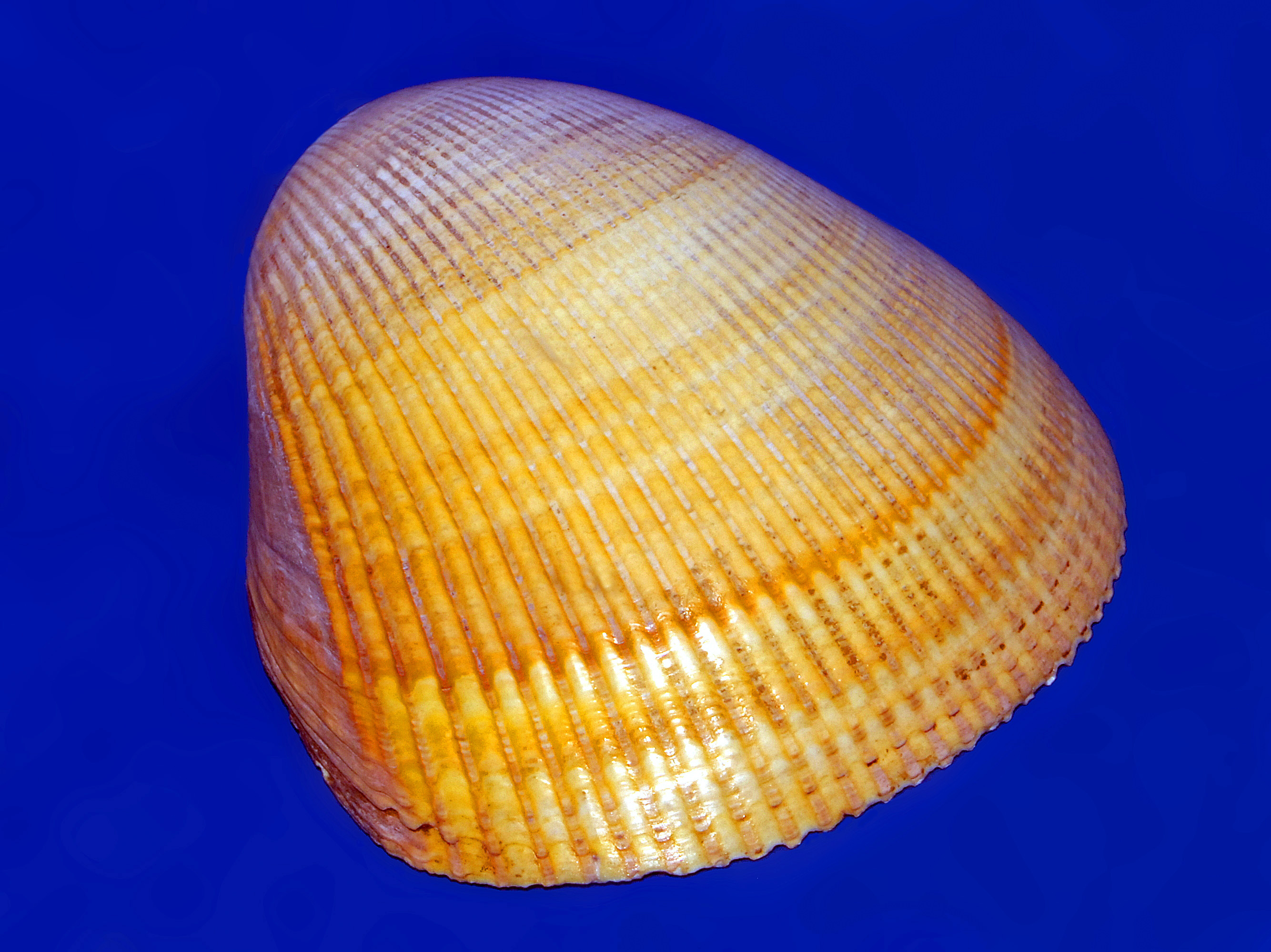
  - Shell of a Laevicardium elatum, or giant egg cockle
    †Laevicardium elatum
  - †Laevicardium substriatum
- Lagena
  - †Lagena isabella
  - †Lagena strumosa
  - †Lagena substriata
  - †Lagena sulcata
  - †Lagena vulgaris
- Lamelliconcha
  - †Lamelliconcha clarki
- Lamna
- Lampanyctus
- †Lampris – type locality for genus
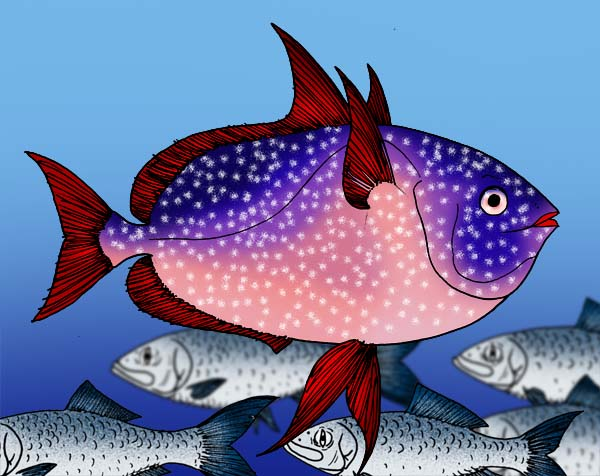
  - Life restoration of the Miocene opah fish Lampris zatima
    †Lampris zatima – type locality for species
- †Lamprolithax – type locality for genus
  - †Lamprolithax annectens – type locality for species
  - †Lamprolithax simulans – type locality for species
- Lampropeltis
  - †Lampropeltis getulus
- †Lantanotherium
  - †Lantanotherium dehmi
  - †Lantanotherium sawini
- †Lapparia
  - †Lapparia eomagna
- Larus
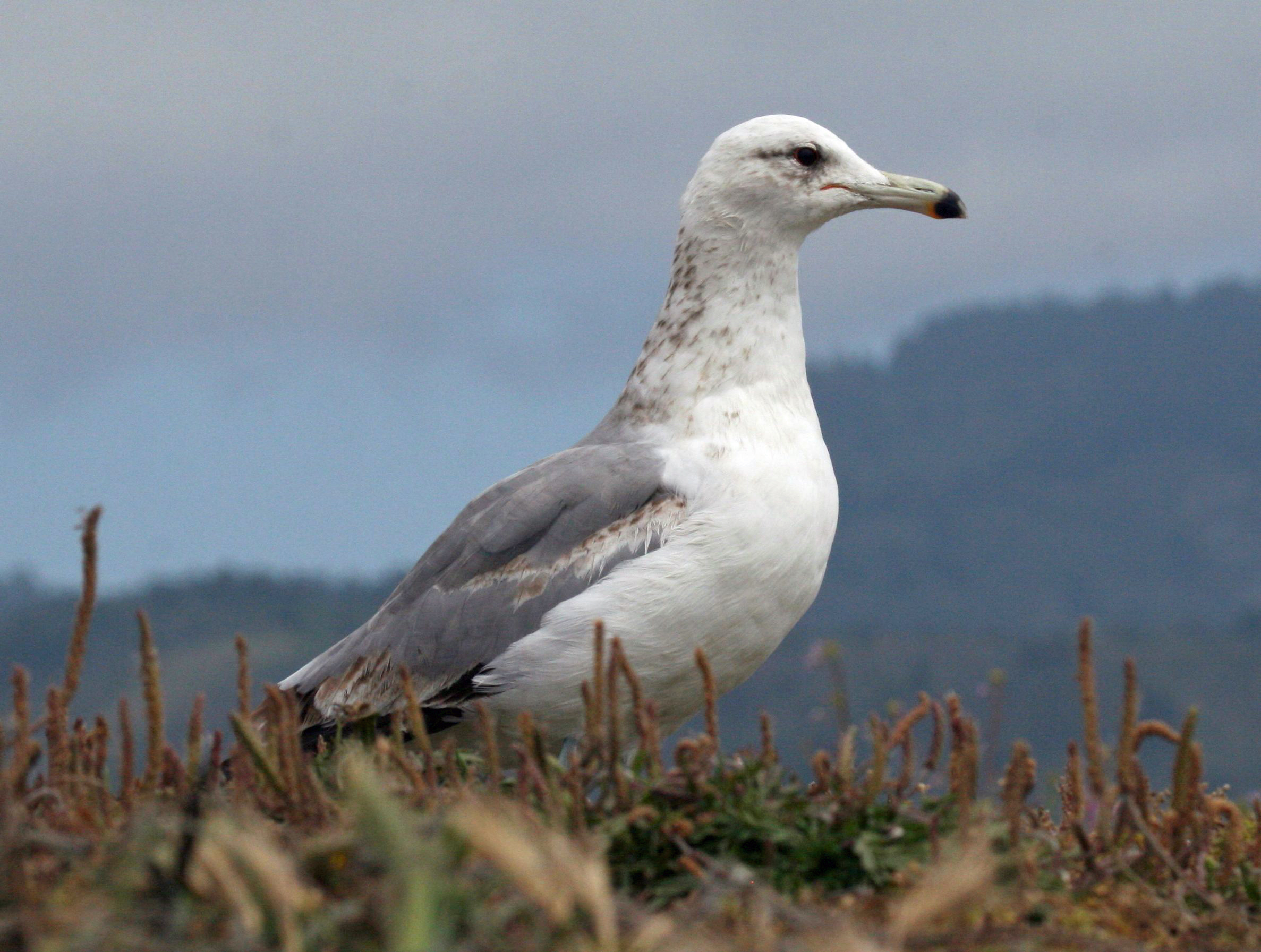
  - A living Larus californicus, or California gull
    †Larus californicus
  - †Larus delawarensis
  - †Larus glaucescens
  - †Larus philadelphia
- Latirus
  - †Latirus buwaldana
  - †Latirus nightingalei – or unidentified comparable form
  - †Latirus roseburgensis – or unidentified comparable form
- †Laurophyllum
  - †Laurophyllum fremontensis
  - †Laurophyllum litseaefolia
- †Laytonia – type locality for genus
  - †Laytonia californica – type locality for species
- Lechytia
- Leda
  - †Leda gabbi
- †Legionarictis – type locality for genus
  - †Legionarictis fortidens – type locality for species
- †Leidymys
- †Lembicus – type locality for genus
  - †Lembicus meiklejohni – type locality for species
- Lenticulina
  - †Lenticulina convergens
- Lepeta
  - †Lepeta concentrica
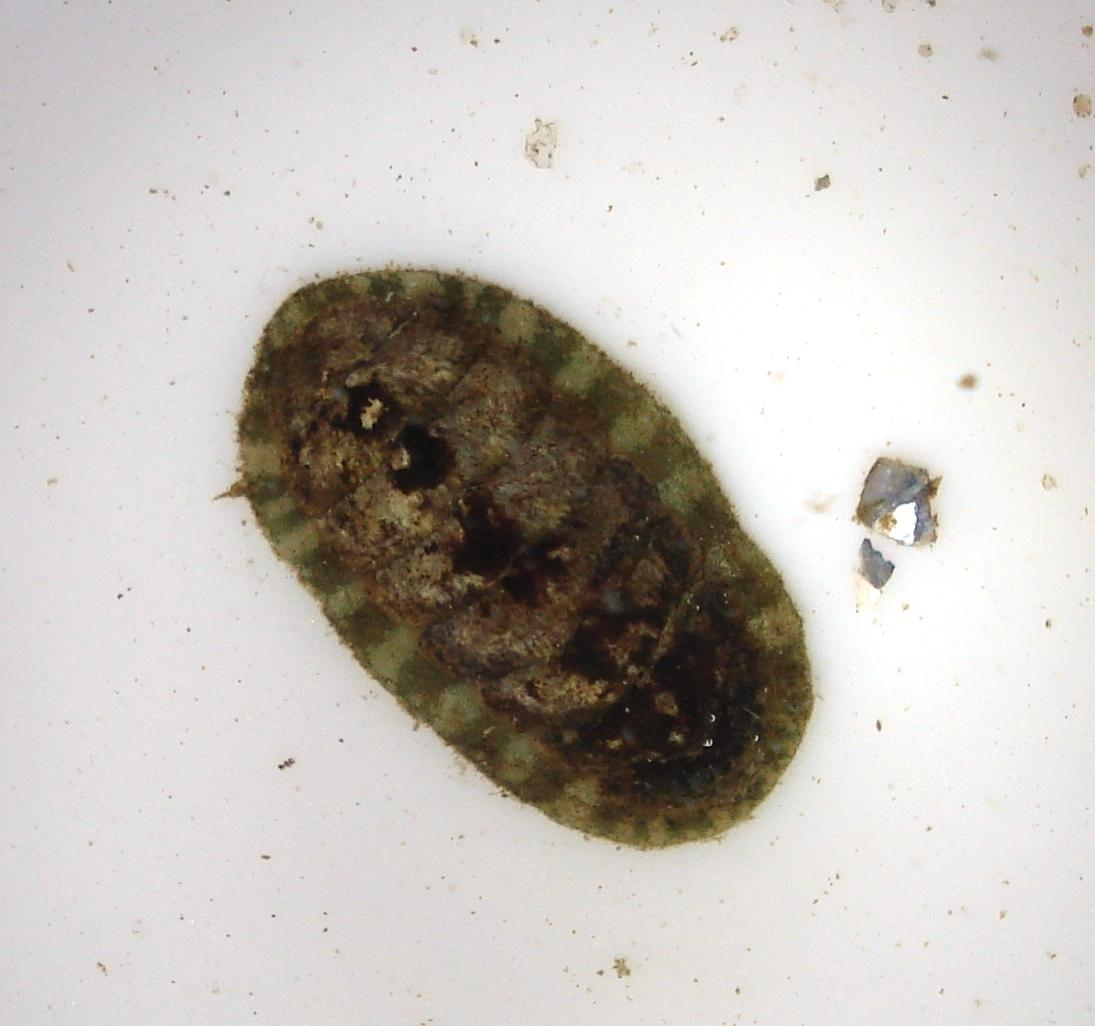
- A living Lepidochitona chiton
  Lepidochitona
  - †Lepidochitona keepiana
- †Lepidogobias
  - †Lepidogobias lepidus
- Lepidozona
  - †Lepidozona pectinulatus
- Lepisosteus
  - †Lepisosteus spatula – or unidentified comparable form
- †Leptacanthichthys
  - †Leptacanthichthys gracilispinis
- †Leptarctus
  - †Leptarctus ancipidens
  - †Leptarctus wortmani
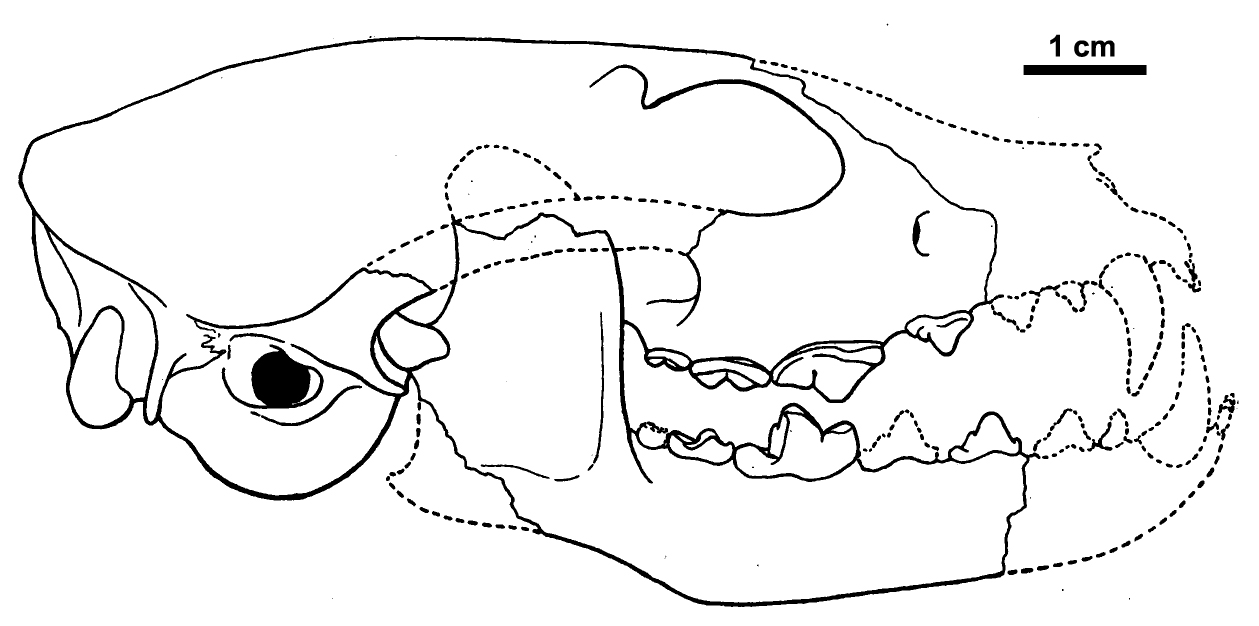
- Illustration of a fossilized skull of the Oligocene-Miocene dog Leptocyon
  †Leptocyon
  - †Leptocyon leidyi
  - †Leptocyon tejonensis – type locality for species
  - †Leptocyon vafer
  - †Leptocyon vulpinus
- †Leptodontomys
  - †Leptodontomys stirtoni
- †Leptomeryx
  - †Leptomeryx blacki
- Leptopecten
  - †Leptopecten andersoni
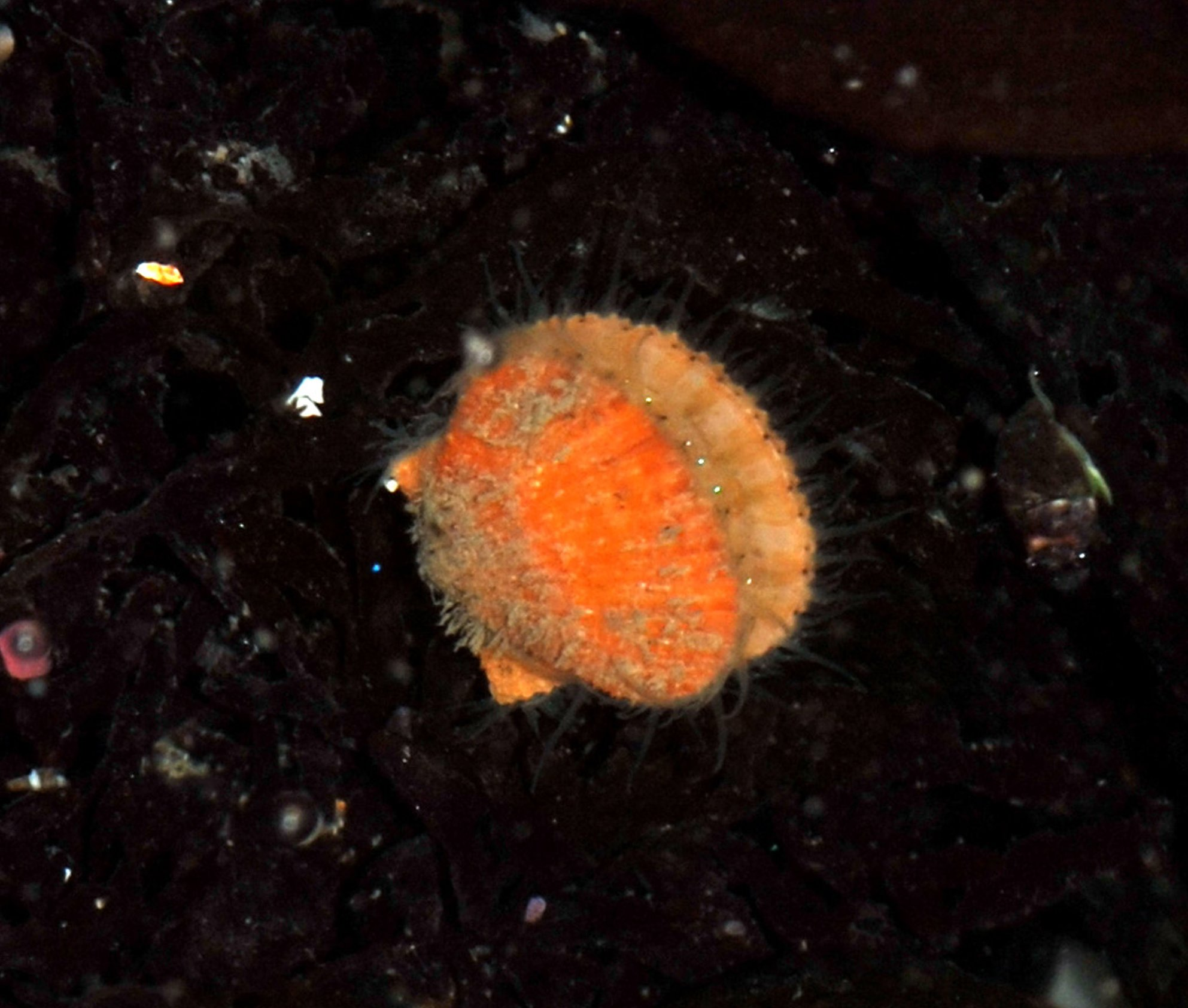
  - A living Leptopecten latiauratus, or kelp scallop
    †Leptopecten latiauratus
- †Leptoreodon
  - †Leptoreodon edwardsi – type locality for species
  - †Leptoreodon golzi – type locality for species
  - †Leptoreodon leptolophus – type locality for species
  - †Leptoreodon major – type locality for species
  - †Leptoreodon marshi – or unidentified comparable form
  - †Leptoreodon pusillus – type locality for species
  - †Leptoreodon stocki – type locality for species
- †Leptotomus
  - †Leptotomus caryophilus
- Lepus
  - †Lepus americanus
  - †Lepus californicus
  - †Lepus callotis
- Leukoma
  - †Leukoma staminea
- Lima
- Limaria
  - †Limaria hemphilli
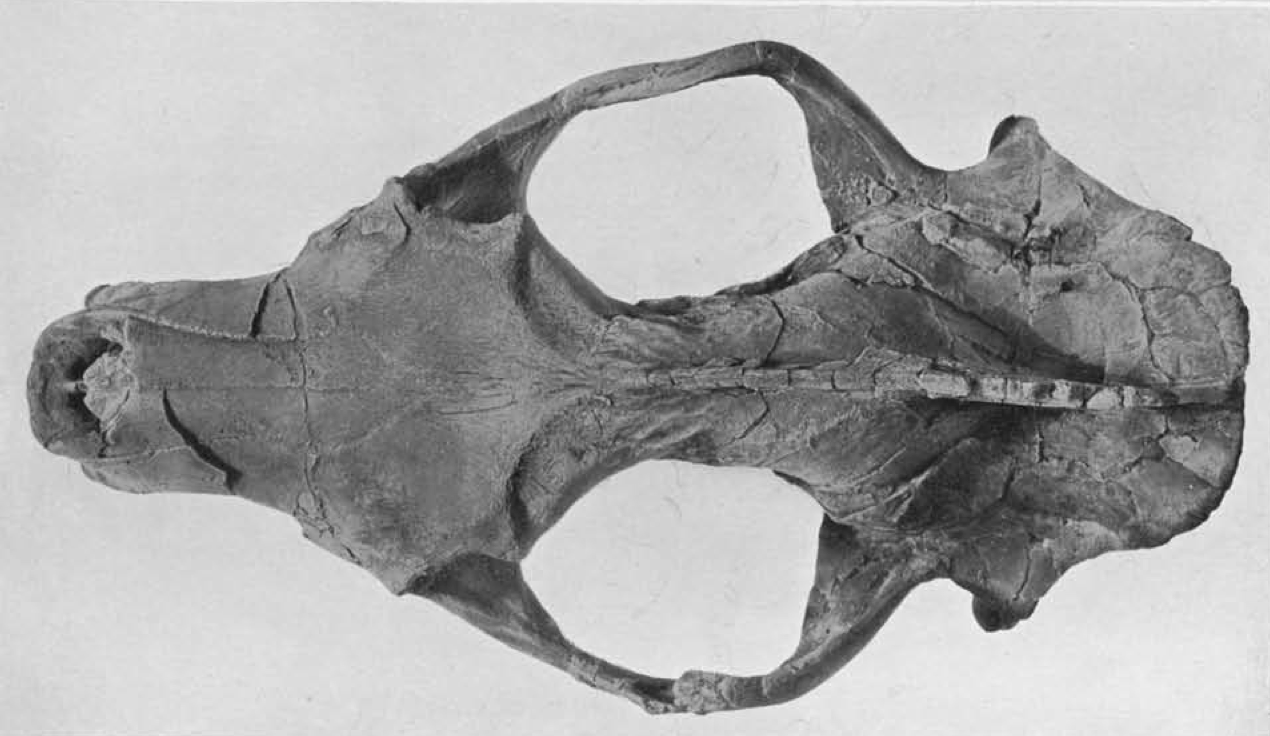
- Top view of a fossilized skull of the Eocene creodont mammal Limnocyon
  †Limnocyon
- †Limnoecus
  - †Limnoecus tricuspis – type locality for species
- †Limosa
  - †Limosa fedoa
  - †Limosa vanrossemi – type locality for species
- Linga
- †Linophryne
  - †Linophryne indica
- †Liolithax – type locality for genus
  - †Liolithax kernensis – type locality for species
- Liquidambar
  - †Liquidambar californicum
- Lirobittium – tentative report
- †Lirosceles
  - †Lirosceles elegans – type locality for species
- Lirularia
  - †Lirularia funiculata
  - †Lirularia lirulata
- Lissodelphis – or unidentified comparable form
- †Lithocarpus
  - †Lithocarpus klamathensis
  - †Lithocarpus nevadensis
- Lithophaga
  - †Lithophaga plumula
- Lithophyllum
  - †Lithophyllum sierraeblancae – type locality for species
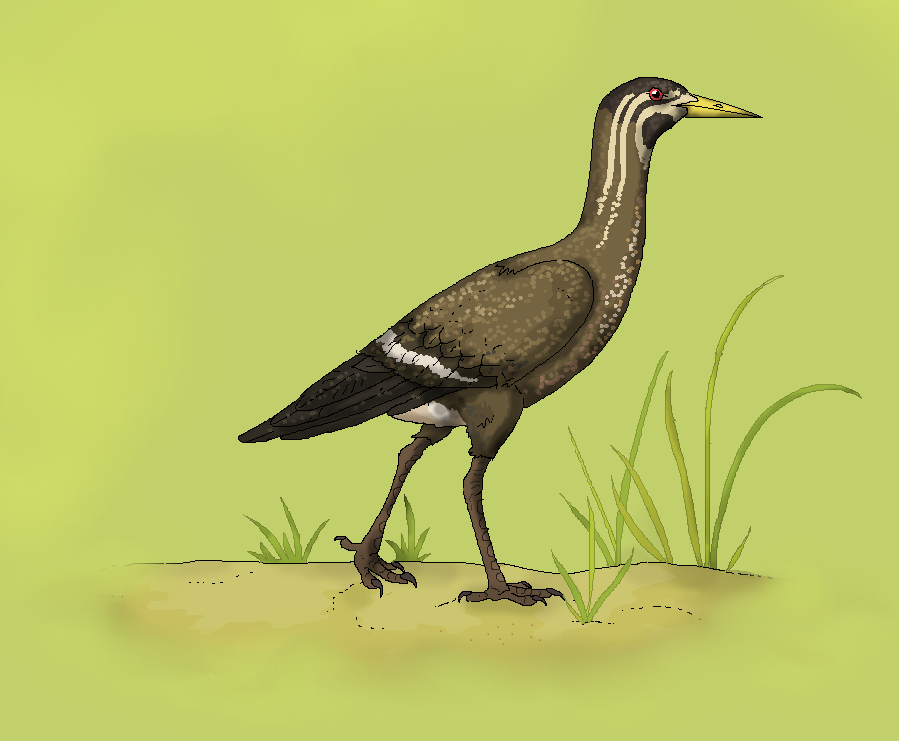
- Life restoration of the Paleocene-Eocene bird Lithornis
  †Lithornis – or unidentified comparable form
- Lithothamnion
  - †Lithothamnion grahami
  - †Lithothamnion laminosum – type locality for species
  - †Lithothamnion luxurum
  - †Lithothamnion manni
  - †Lithothamnion meganosium
  - †Lithothamnion validum – or unidentified related form
  - †Lithothamnion wallisium
- †Litorhadia
  - †Litorhadia washingtonensis – or unidentified comparable form
- Littorina
  - †Littorina petricola
  - †Littorina planaxis
  - †Littorina scutulata
- †Lituyapecten
  - †Lituyapecten purisimaensis
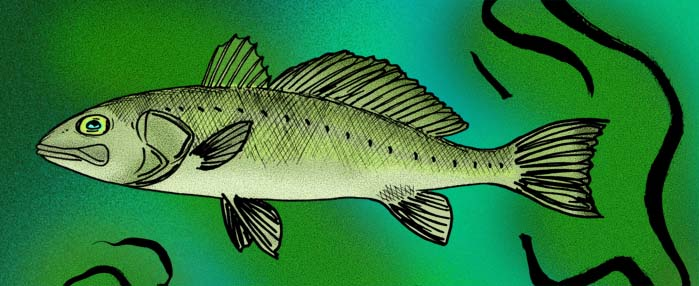
- Life restoration of the Miocene marine drumfish Lompoquia
  †Lompoquia – type locality for genus
  - †Lompoquia retropes – type locality for species
- †Lonchodelphis
  - †Lonchodelphis occiduus – type locality for species
- Lontra
  - †Lontra canadensis
- †Lophar – type locality for genus
  - †Lophar miocaenus – type locality for species
- †Lophocetus
  - †Lophocetus repenningi – type locality for species
- †Lophortyx
  - †Lophortyx californica
- †Lora
- †Losinia
- Lottia
  - †Lottia limatula
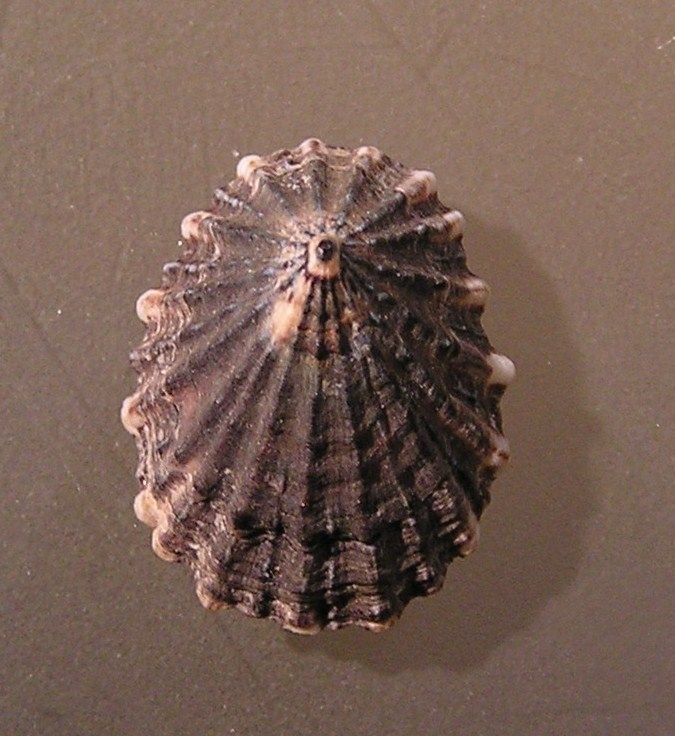
  - Shell of a Lottia scabra, or rough limpet
    †Lottia scabra
- †Loxolithax – type locality for genus
  - †Loxolithax sinuosa – type locality for species
- †Loxotrema
  - †Loxotrema turritum
- Lucapinella
  - †Lucapinella callomarginata
- Lucina
  - †Lucina gaylordi
  - †Lucina wattsi
- Lucinisca
  - †Lucinisca nuttalli
- Lucinoma
  - †Lucinoma acutilineata
  - †Lucinoma annulatum
- Luidia
  - †Luidia etchegoinensis – type locality for species
  - †Luidia sanjoaquinensis – type locality for species
- †Lutianus
  - †Lutianus hagari – type locality for species
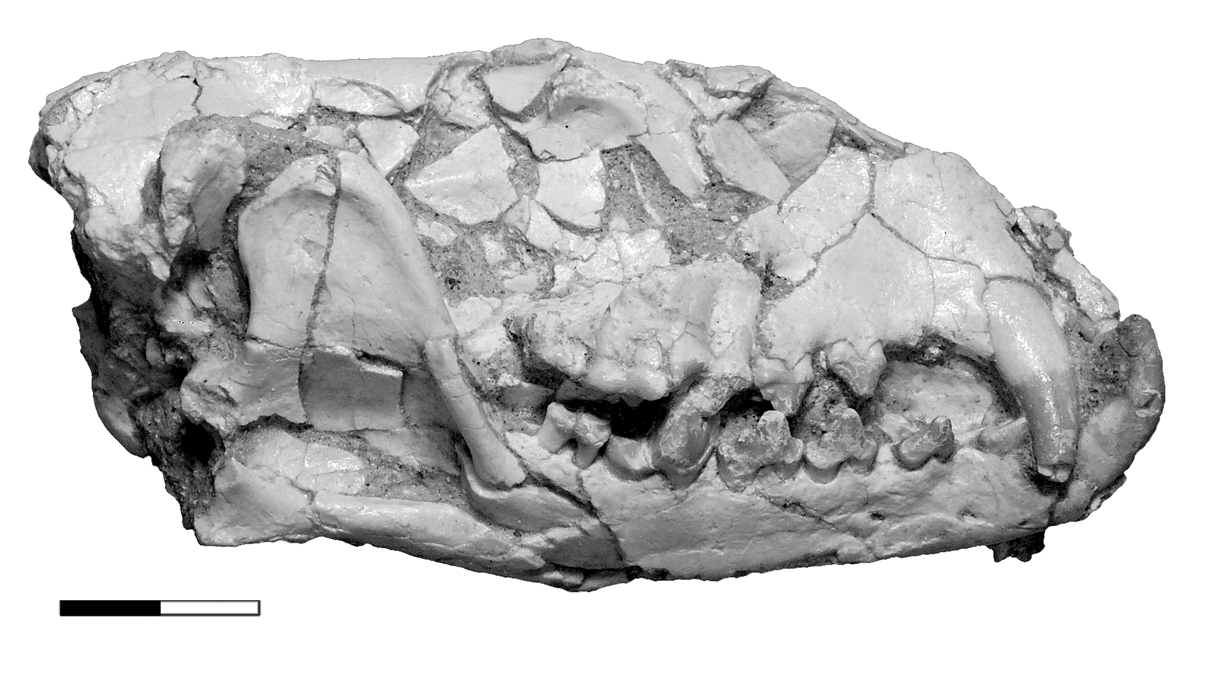
- Fossilized skull of the Eocene carnivoran mammal Lycophocyon
  †Lycophocyon – type locality for genus
  - †Lycophocyon hutchisoni – type locality for species
- †Lygisma – type locality for genus
  - †Lygisma tenax – type locality for species
- Lygodium
  - †Lygodium kaulfussi
- Lynx
  - †Lynx fasciatus
  - †Lynx rufus
- Lyonsia
  - †Lyonsia califomica
  - †Lyonsia venturaensis – type locality for species
- Lyria
  - †Lyria andersoni
- †Lyrischapa
  - †Lyrischapa lajollaensis
- †Lyropecten
  - †Lyropecten bowersi
  - †Lyropecten crassicardo
  - †Lyropecten magnolia
  - †Lyropecten miguelensis
  - †Lyropecten perrini
- †Lyrosurcula – tentative report

== M ==
- †Machaeromeryx – tentative report
  - †Machaeromeryx tragulus
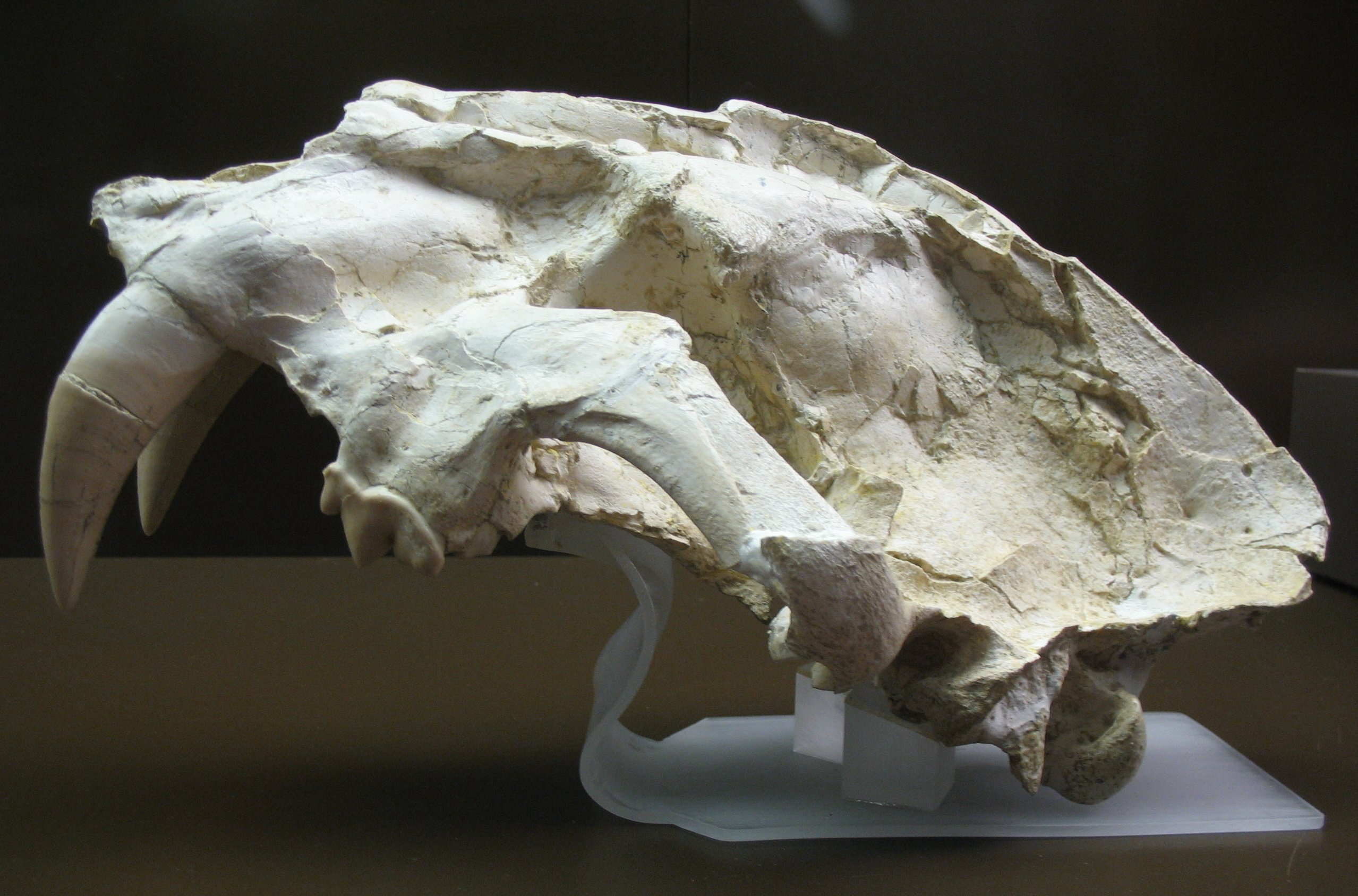
- Fossilized cranium of the Miocene-Pleistocene saber-toothed cat Machairodus
  †Machairodus
- Macoma
  - †Macoma andersoni
  - †Macoma calcarea
  - †Macoma carlottensis
  - †Macoma copelandi
  - †Macoma diabloensis
  - †Macoma expansa
  - †Macoma indentata
  - †Macoma inquinata
  - †Macoma moesta
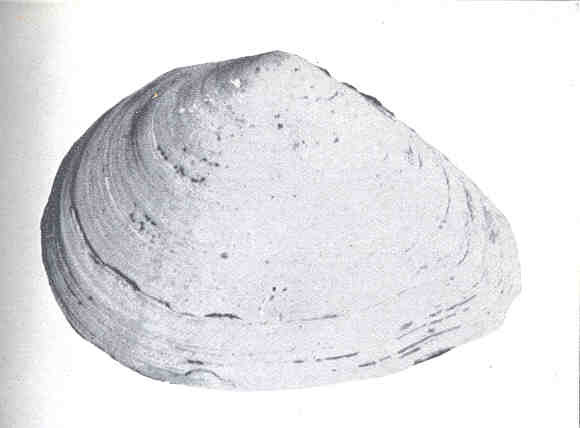
  - Shell of Macoma nasuta, or the bent-nosed clam
    †Macoma nasuta
  - †Macoma pabloensis – or unidentified comparable form
  - †Macoma panzana
  - †Macoma planiuscula – or unidentified comparable form
  - †Macoma secta
  - †Macoma viticola
- Macrarene
- Macrocallista
  - †Macrocallista furlongi – or unidentified comparable form
  - †Macrocallista horni – or unidentified comparable form
  - †Macrocallista meganosensis – type locality for species
  - †Macrocallista pittsburgensis
  - †Macrocallista squalida
  - †Macrocallista squalidus
  - †Macrocallista weaveri
- †Macrochlamis
  - †Macrochlamis magnolia
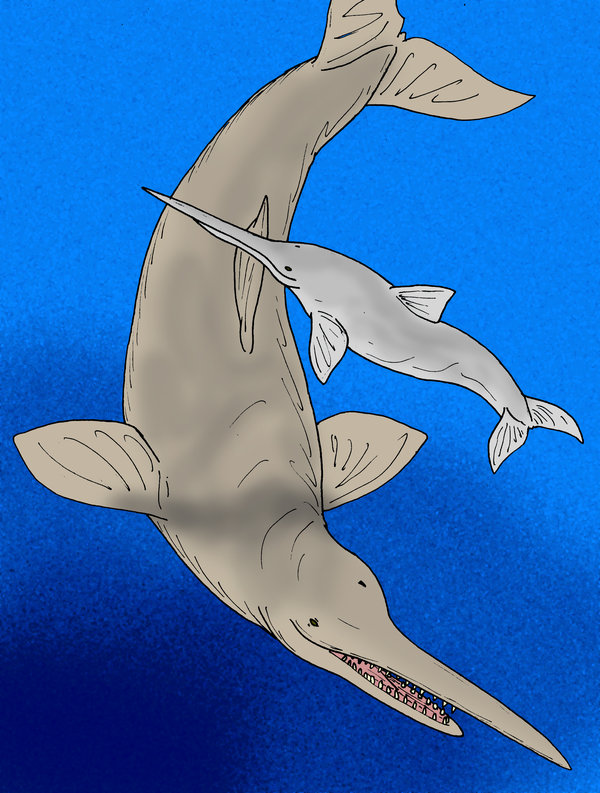
- Life restoration of the Oligocene toothed-whale Macrodelphinus (background)
  †Macrodelphinus – type locality for genus
  - †Macrodelphinus kelloggi – type locality for species
- †Macrotarsius
  - †Macrotarsius roederi – type locality for species
- Mactromeris
  - †Mactromeris abbotti
  - †Mactromeris acutirostrata – or unidentified comparable form
  - †Mactromeris albaria
  - †Mactromeris bisculpturata – or unidentified comparable form
  - †Mactromeris brevirostrata
  - †Mactromeris catilliformis
  - †Mactromeris hemphillii
  - †Mactromeris mercedensis – or unidentified comparable form
  - †Mactromeris merriami
  - †Mactromeris montereyana – type locality for species
  - †Mactromeris muliniaformis – type locality for species
  - †Mactromeris pittsburgensis – or unidentified comparable form
  - †Mactromeris polynyma
  - †Mactromeris ramonensis
  - †Mactromeris rushi
  - †Mactromeris sectoris
  - †Mactromeris tejonensis
- Mactrotoma
  - †Mactrotoma californica
  - †Mactrotoma nasuta
- Madracis
  - †Madracis wellsi – type locality for species
- Madrepora
  - †Madrepora solida – type locality for species
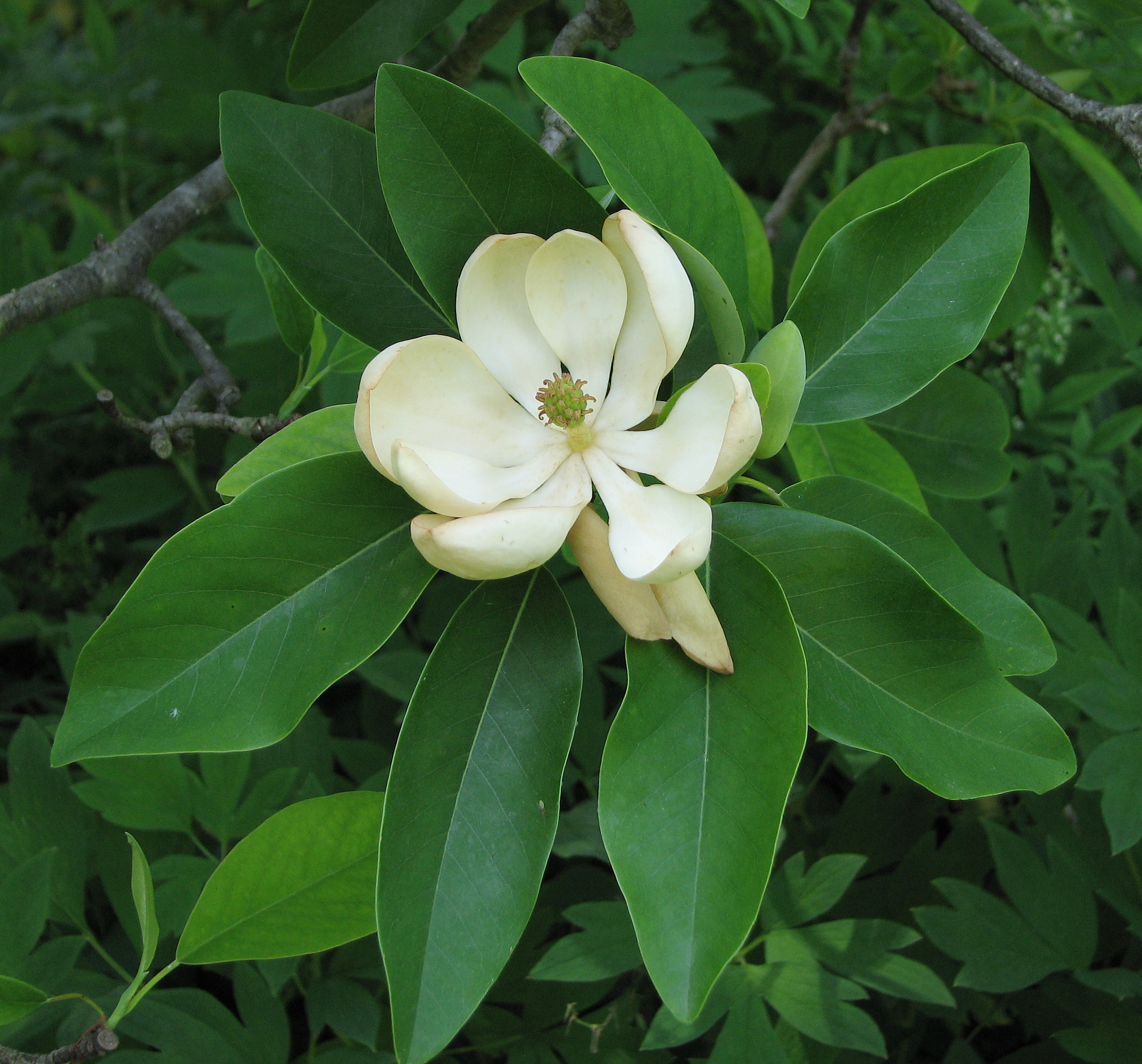
- Close-up view of a Magnolia flower
  Magnolia
  - †Magnolia corrallina
  - †Magnolia dayana
- Mahonia
  - †Mahonia macginitiei
  - †Mahonia reticulata
  - †Mahonia simplex
- Makaira
- Malea
  - †Malea ringens
- Malletia
- Mallotus
  - †Mallotus riparius
- †Mambrinia
  - †Mambrinia gallica – type locality for species
- †Mammut
  - †Mammut americanum – all local specimens previously referred to this species have since been reclassified in the new species M. pacificus.
  - †Mammut cosoensis
  - †Mammut matthewi
  - †Mammut pacificus – type locality for species. Many specimens were previously regarded as specimens of M. americanum.
- †Mammuthus
  - †Mammuthus columbi
  - †Mammuthus exilis
  - †Mammuthus hayi
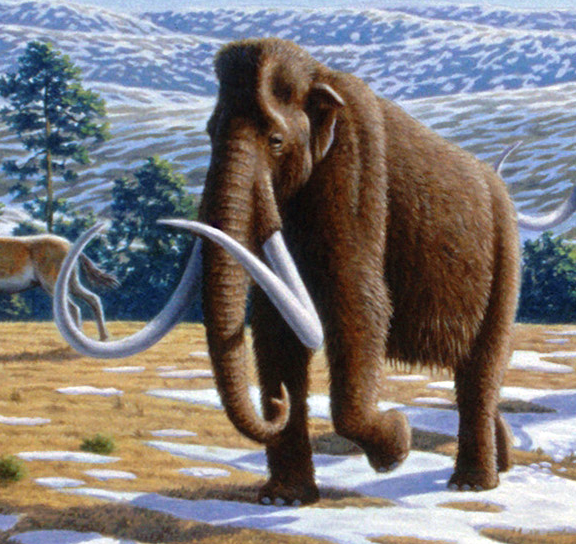
  - Restoration of a herd of Mammuthus primigenius, or wooly mammoths
    †Mammuthus primigenius
- †Mancalla – type locality for genus
  - †Mancalla californiensis – type locality for species
  - †Mancalla cedrosensis – or unidentified comparable form
  - †Mancalla diegenesis
  - †Mancalla diegensis – type locality for species
  - †Mancalla emlongi – type locality for species
  - †Mancalla lucasi – type locality for species
  - †Mancalla milleri – type locality for species
  - †Mancalla vegrandis
  - †Mancalla vergrandis – type locality for species
- †Mangelia
  - †Mangelia variegata
- †Margaritana
  - †Margaritana falcata – or unidentified comparable form
- Margarites
  - †Margarites pupillus
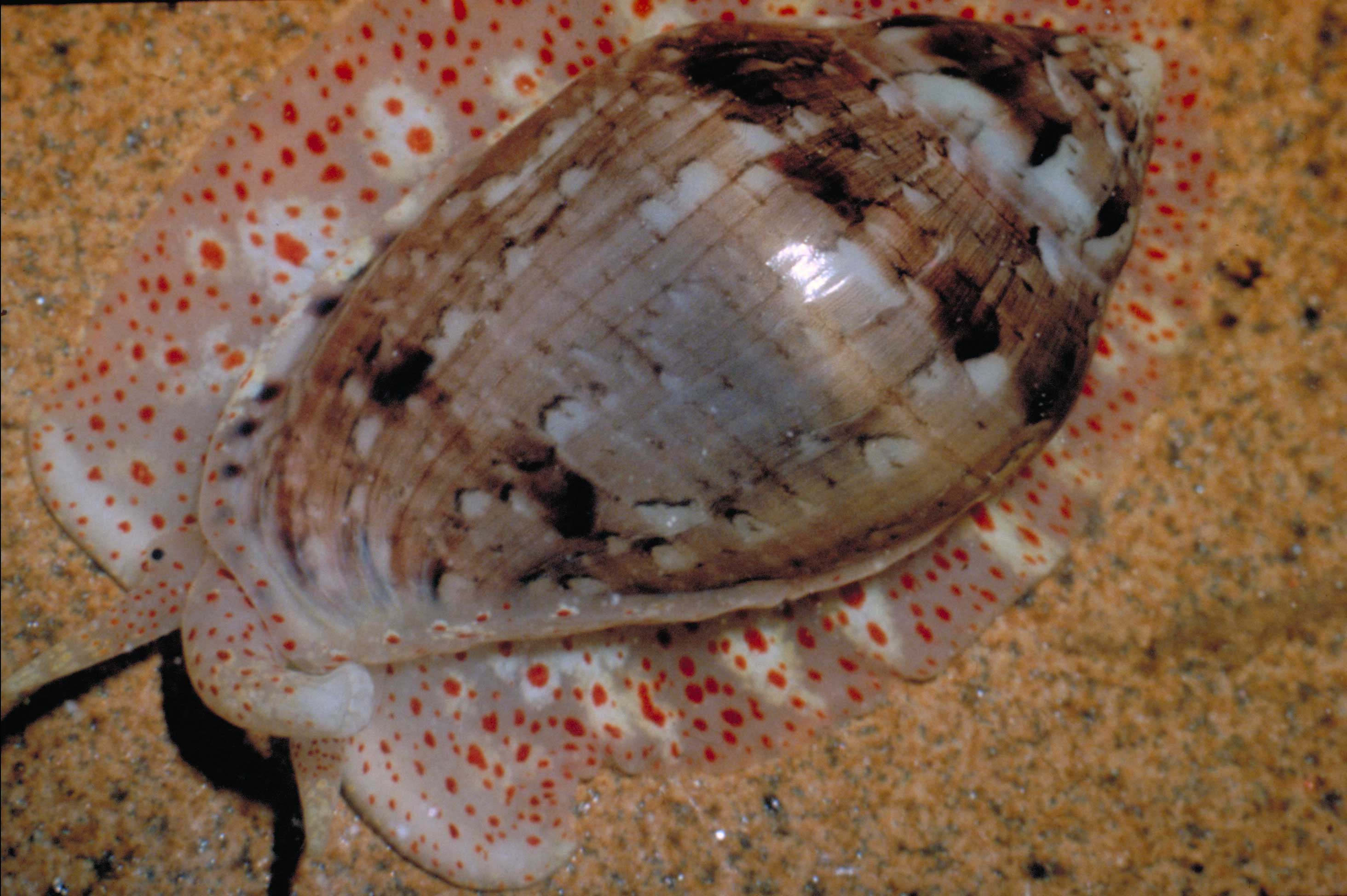
- A living Marginella margin sea snail
  Marginella
- Marginulina
  - †Marginulina adunca – or unidentified comparable form
  - †Marginulina dubia
  - †Marginulina eximia
  - †Marginulina munda
- Marmota
- †Marshochoerus
  - †Marshochoerus socialis
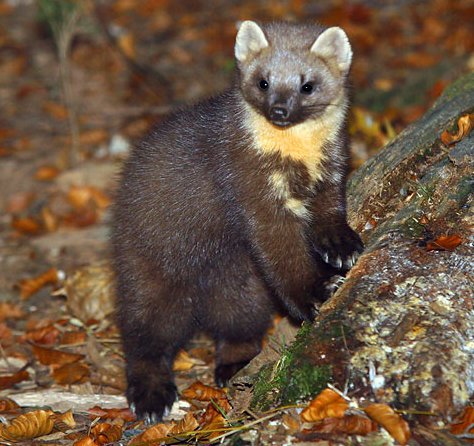
- A living Martes, or marten
  Martes
- Martesia
  - †Martesia meganosensis – type locality for species
- †Martinogale
  - †Martinogale faulli – type locality for species
- Martinottiella
  - †Martinottiella eocenica
- Maxwellia
  - †Maxwellia gemma
- †Mayena – tentative report
  - †Mayena kewi – or unidentified comparable form
- †Mealanitta
  - †Mealanitta deglandi
- †Mediochoerus
  - †Mediochoerus mohavensis
- †Megacamelus
  - †Megacamelus merriami
- Megachasma
  - †Megachasma applegatei – type locality for species
- Megachile
  - †Megachile gentilis
- †Megahippus
  - †Megahippus matthewi
  - †Megahippus mckennai – type locality for species
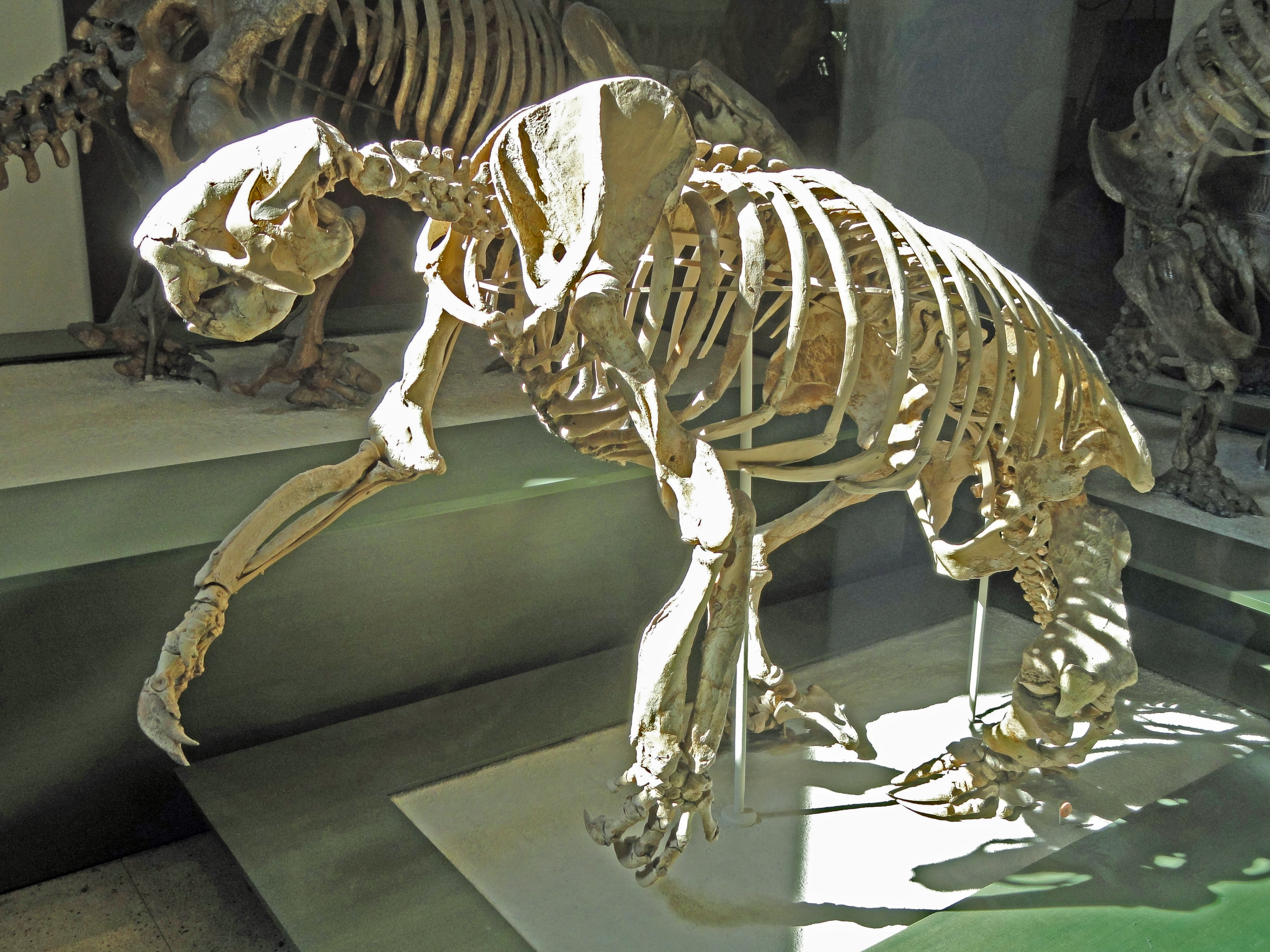
- Mounted fossilized skeleton of the Miocene-Pleistocene ground sloth Megalonyx
  †Megalonyx
  - †Megalonyx jeffersonii
  - †Megalonyx mathisi – type locality for species
  - †Megalonyx wheatleyi
- Megalops – tentative report
  - †Megalops vigilax
- †Megapaloelodus
  - †Megapaloelodus connectens
- †Megapetalus
- Megaptera
  - †Megaptera miocaena – type locality for species
- Megatebennus
  - †Megatebennus bimaculata
  - †Megatebennus bimaculatus
- Megathura – tentative report
- †Megatylopus
  - †Megatylopus matthewi – or unidentified comparable form
- †Megistostoma
  - †Megistostoma gabbiana – or unidentified comparable form
- Melampus
  - †Melampus olivaceous
  - †Melampus olivaceus
- Melanella
  - †Melanella hastata
  - †Melanella micans
- Melanitta
  - †Melanitta ceruttii – type locality for species
  - †Melanitta deglandi – tentative report
  - †Melanitta fusca
  - †Melanitta perspicillata
- Melanoplus
  - †Melanoplus differentialis
- Melanthrips
- Meleagris
  - †Meleagris richmondi – type locality for species
- †Meliosma
  - †Meliosma truncata – type locality for species
- †Melosira
  - †Melosira solida
- Melospiza
  - †Melospiza melodia
- †Meniscomys
- †Meniscotherium
  - †Meniscotherium tapiacitum
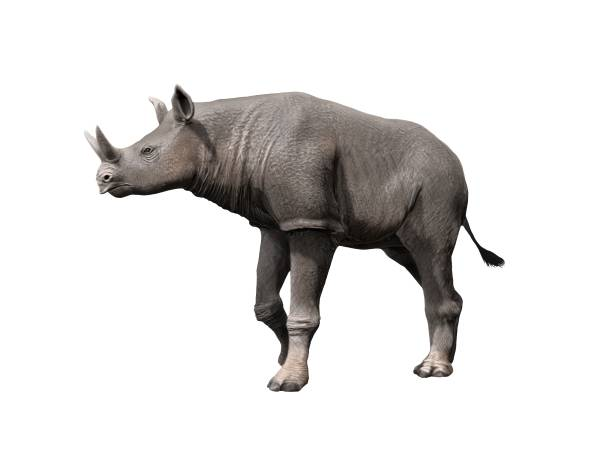
- Life restoration of the Miocene rhinoceros Menoceras
  †Menoceras
  - †Menoceras barbouri
- Mephitis
  - †Mephitis mephitis
- †Mercyhippus – report made of unidentified related form or using admittedly obsolete nomenclature
  - †Mercyhippus brevidontus
- Meretrix
  - †Meretrix californica
  - †Meretrix conradi
  - †Meretrix hornii
  - †Meretrix lorenzana
  - †Meretrix palmeri – type locality for species
  - †Meretrix stantoni
  - †Meretrix uvasana – type locality for species
- Mergus
  - †Mergus serrator
- Merluccius
  - †Merluccius productus
- †Merriamina – type locality for genus
  - †Merriamina ectenes – type locality for species
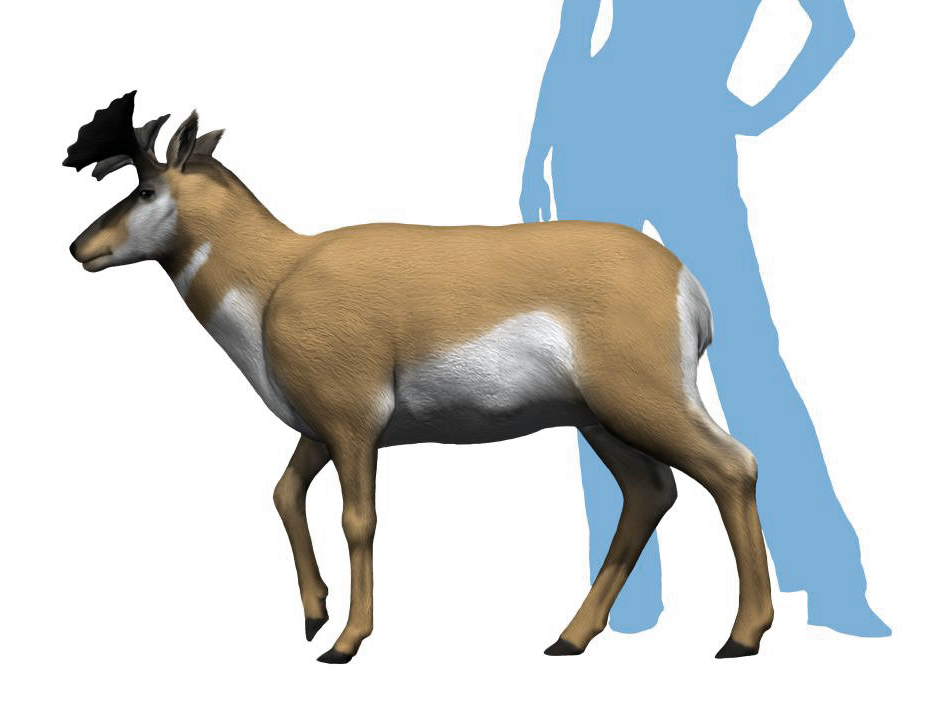
- Life restoration of the Miocene pronghorn Merriamoceros with an anachronistic human to scale
  †Merriamoceros
  - †Merriamoceros coronatus – type locality for species
- †Merychippus
  - †Merychippus brevidontus – type locality for species
  - †Merychippus californicus – type locality for species
  - †Merychippus relictus – or unidentified comparable form
  - †Merychippus stevensi
- †Merychyus
  - †Merychyus elegans
  - †Merychyus minimus
  - †Merychyus novomexicanus
  - †Merychyus smithi
- †Merycobunodon
  - †Merycobunodon littoralis – type locality for species
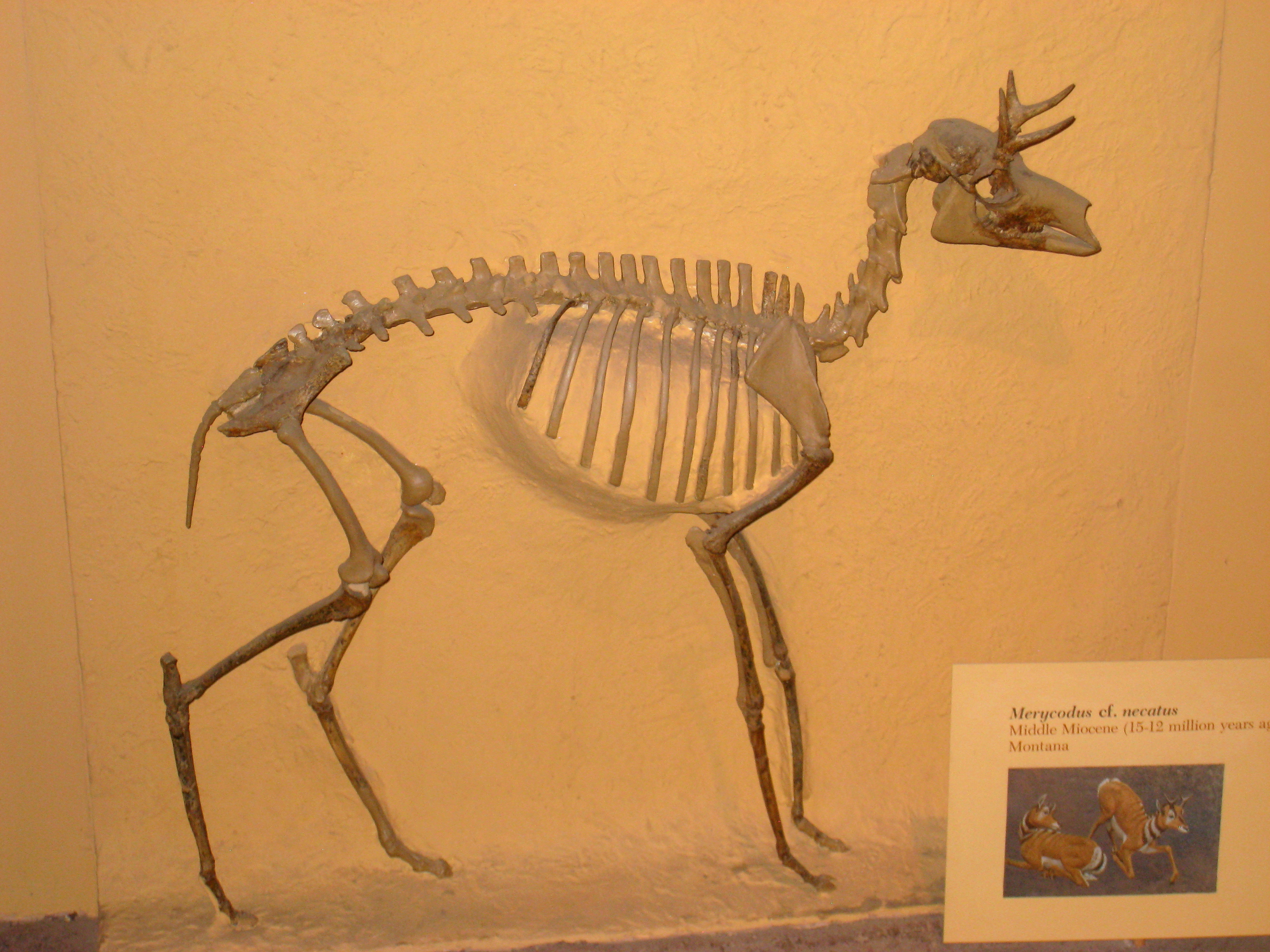
- Mounted fossilized skeleton of the Miocene pronghorn Merycodus
  †Merycodus
  - †Merycodus joraki
  - †Merycodus necatus
- Mesalia
  - †Mesalia clarki – type locality for species
  - †Mesalia martinezensis
- †Mesocyon
  - †Mesocyon brachyops
  - †Mesocyon coryphaeus
- †Mesodma – tentative report
- †Mesohippus
- Mesophyllum
  - †Mesophyllum californicum
  - †Mesophyllum fructiferum
  - †Mesophyllum obsitum
  - †Mesophyllum schenckii – type locality for species
  - †Mesophyllum schenki
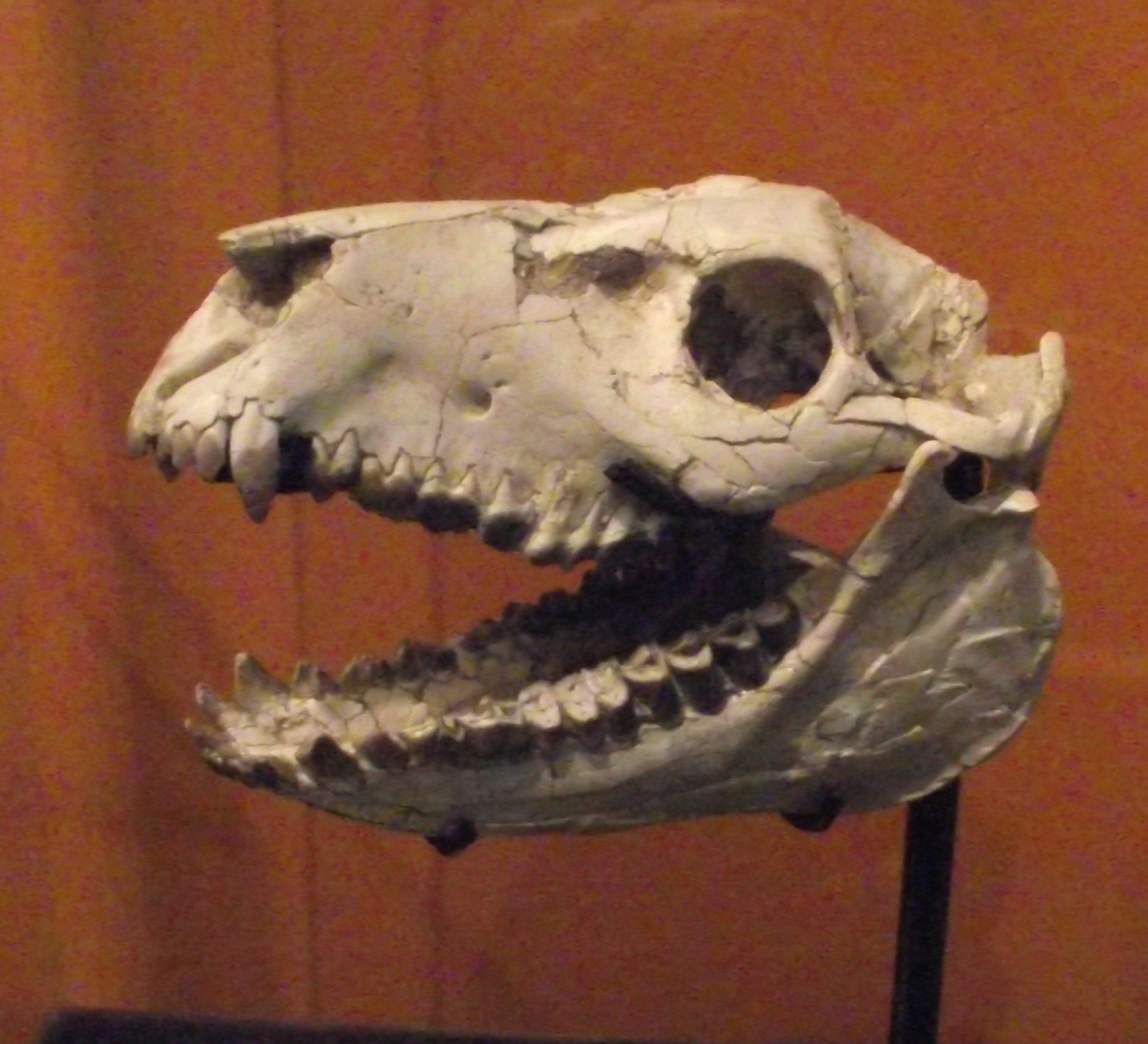
- Fossilized skull of the Miocene oreodont mammal Mesoreodon
  †Mesoreodon
  - †Mesoreodon chelonyx
- †Metacerithium
  - †Metacerithium packardi
- †Metalopex
  - †Metalopex merriami
- †Metanoiamys
  - †Metanoiamys agorus – type locality for species
  - †Metanoiamys fantasma
  - †Metanoiamys korthi – type locality for species
  - †Metanoiamys marinus – type locality for species
- †Metarhinus
  - †Metarhinus pater – type locality for species
- †Metatomarctus
  - †Metatomarctus canavus
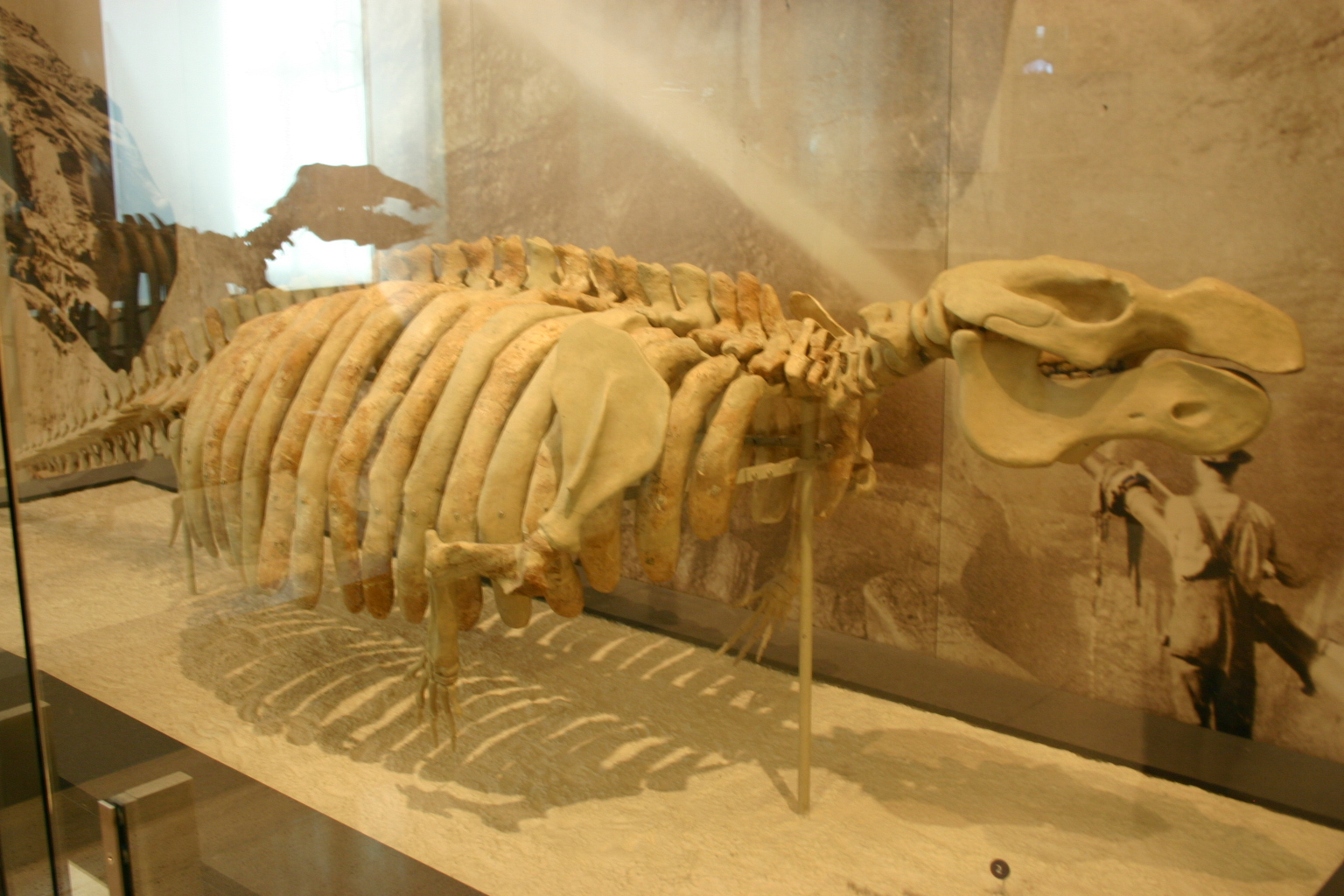
- Mounted fossilized skeleton of the Miocene-Pleistocene manatee relative Metaxytherium
  †Metaxytherium
  - †Metaxytherium arctodites
- †Metechinus
  - †Metechinus amplior
- †Miacis
  - †Miacis hookwayi – type locality for species
- †Michenia
  - †Michenia agatensis
  - †Michenia mudhillsensis
- Micranellum
  - †Micranellum crebricinctum
- †Microcosmodon – or unidentified comparable form
- Microdipodops
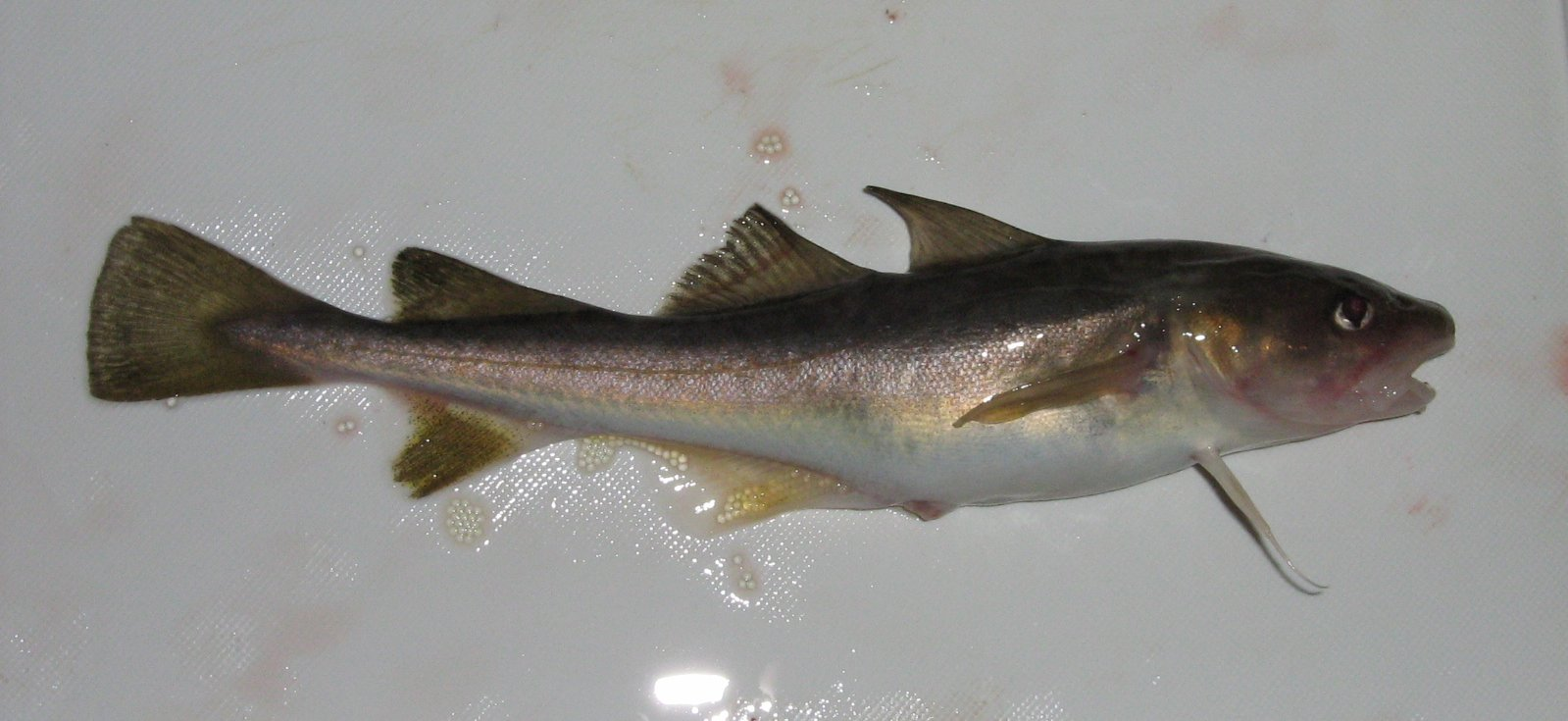
- A modern Microgadus, or tomcod
  Microgadus – tentative report
- †Micropallus
  - †Micropallus whitneyi
- †Microparamys
  - †Microparamys minutus – or unidentified comparable form
  - †Microparamys tricus – type locality for species
  - †Microparamys woodi – type locality for species
- †Microsula
- †Microsyops
  - †Microsyops annectens – or unidentified comparable form
  - †Microsyops kratos – type locality for species
- †Microtomarctus
  - †Microtomarctus conferta
- Microtus
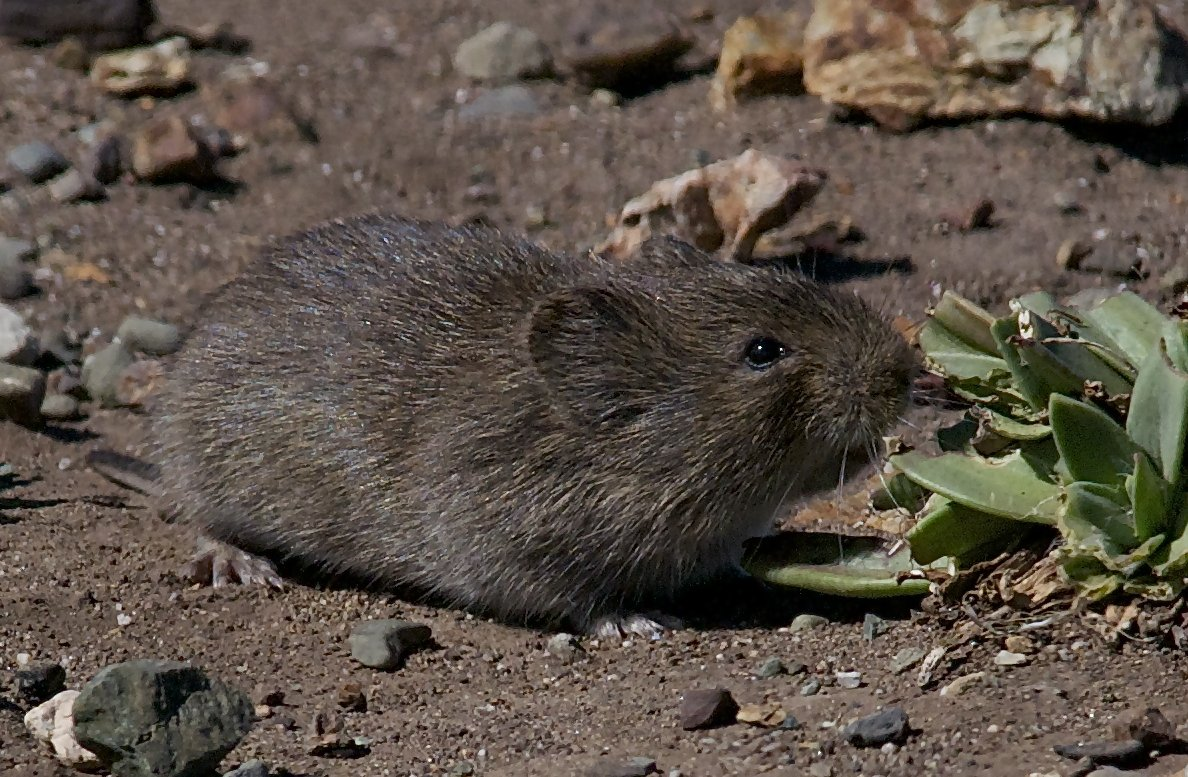
  - A living Microtus californicus, or California vole
    †Microtus californicus
  - †Microtus meadensis
  - †Microtus miguelensis – type locality for species
- Mictomys
  - †Mictomys kansasensis
  - †Mictomys vetus
- Miltha
  - †Miltha meganosensis – type locality for species
  - †Miltha packi
  - †Miltha sanctaecrucis
  - †Miltha xantusi
- †Mimomys
- †Mimotricentes
  - †Mimotricentes tedfordi – type locality for species
- †Miochlorotettix – type locality for genus
  - †Miochlorotettix gibroni – type locality for species
  - †Miochlorotettix kirkbyi – type locality for species
- †Miocryptorhopalum – type locality for genus
  - †Miocryptorhopalum kirkbyae – type locality for species
- †Miocyon
  - †Miocyon scotti – or unidentified comparable form
- †Miodelphis – type locality for genus
  - †Miodelphis californicus – type locality for species
- †Miogonates – type locality for genus
  - †Miogonates subimpunctatus – type locality for species
- †Miohierax – type locality for genus
  - †Miohierax stocki – type locality for species
- †Miohippus
  - †Miohippus annectens
- †Miolabis
  - †Miolabis californicus – type locality for species
  - †Miolabis fricki – type locality for species
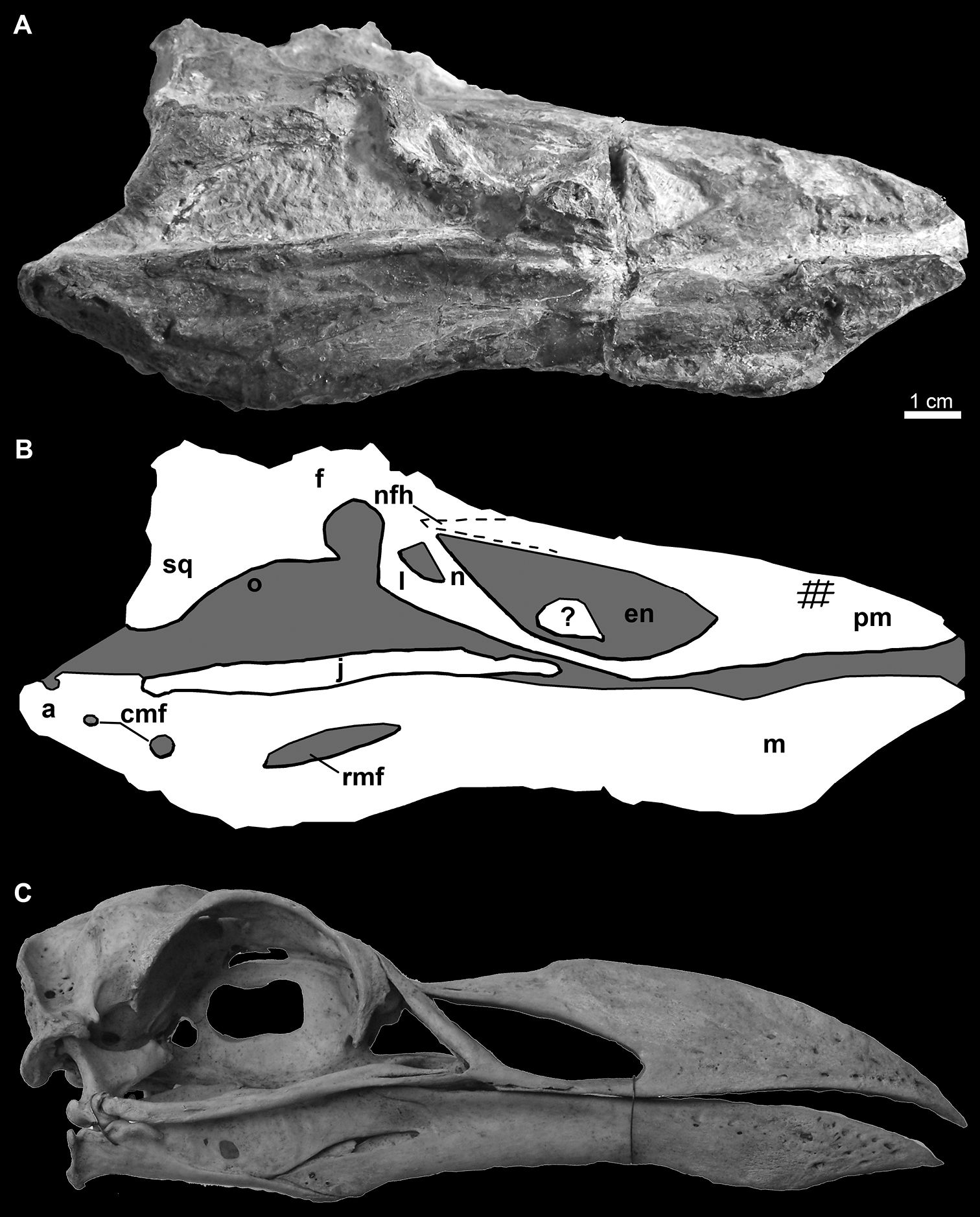
- Fossilized skull (top) and interpretive line drawing (middle) of the Miocene auk relative Miomancalla compared with the skull of a Holocene Pinguinus impennis, or great auk
  †Miomancalla
  - †Miomancalla howardi – type locality for species
  - †Miomancalla wetmorei – type locality for species
- †Miomesamia – type locality for genus
  - †Miomesamia juliae – type locality for species
- †Miomonalonion – type locality for genus
  - †Miomonalonion conoidifrons – type locality for species
- †Miomustela
- †Mionictis
  - †Mionictis angustidens
- †Miospermophilus
  - †Miospermophilus wyomingensis – or unidentified comparable form
- †Miosula – type locality for genus
  - †Miosula media – type locality for species
- †Miotapirus
- †Miotomodon
  - †Miotomodon mayi – type locality for species
- †Miotroctes – type locality for genus
  - †Miotroctes rousei – type locality for species
- †Miotylopus
  - †Miotylopus gibbi
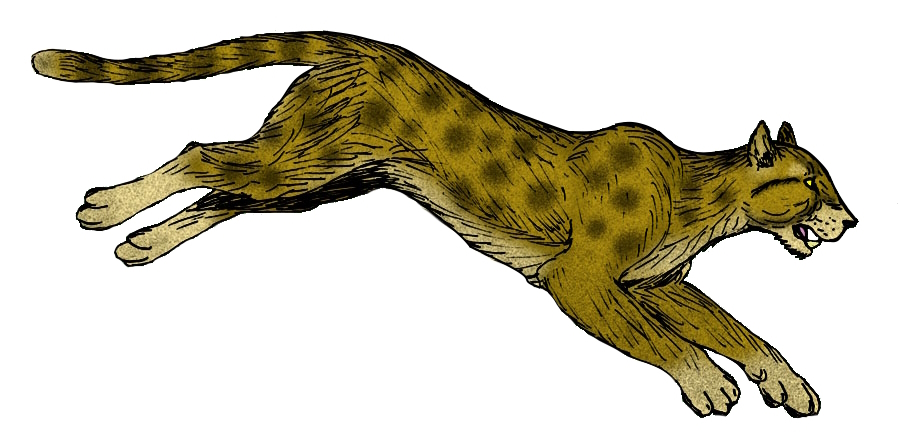
- Restoration of the Pliocene-Pleistocene Miracinonyx, or American cheetah
  †Miracinonyx
  - †Miracinonyx studeri – tentative report
- Mirounga
  - †Mirounga angustirostris – or unidentified comparable form
- Mitra
  - †Mitra fultoni
  - †Mitra idae
  - †Mitra idea
  - †Mitra simplicissima
- Mitrella
  - †Mitrella carinata
  - †Mitrella gausapata
  - †Mitrella gouldi
  - †Mitrella tuberosa
- †Mixocetus – type locality for genus
  - †Mixocetus elysius – type locality for species
- Modiolatus
  - †Modiolatus rectus
- Modiolus
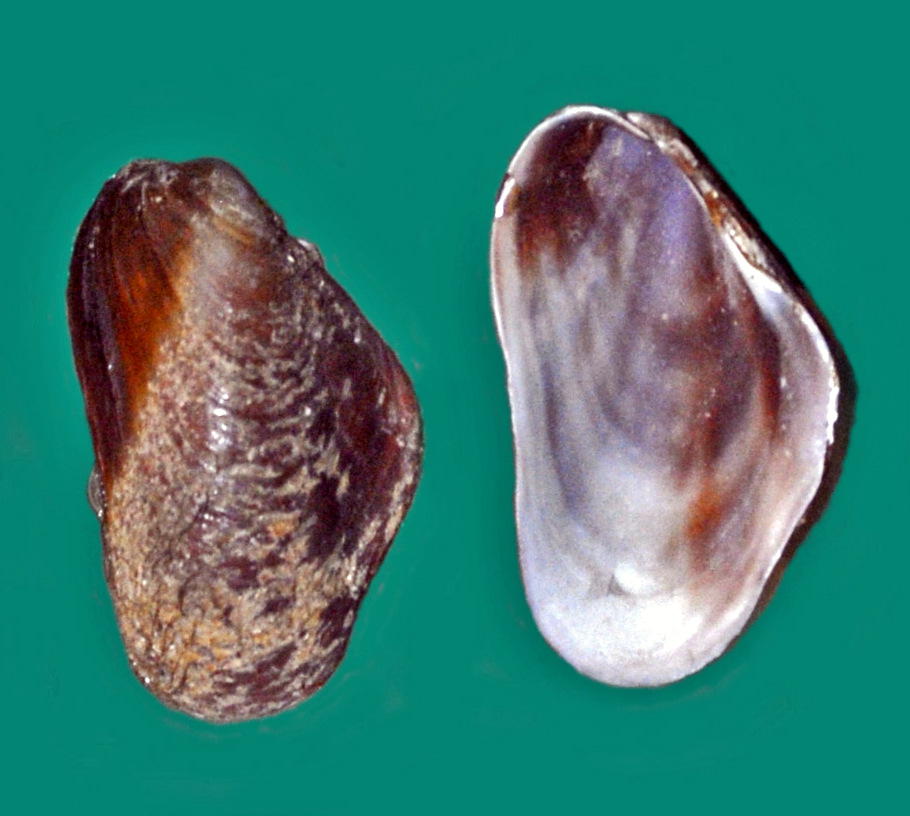
  - Exterior (left) and interior of the shell of a Modiolus capax, or fat horsemussel
    †Modiolus capax – or unidentified comparable form
  - †Modiolus carpenteri
  - †Modiolus multiradiatus
  - †Modiolus ornatus
  - †Modiolus veronensis
  - †Modiolus ynezianus
- Modulus
  - †Modulus unidens
- †Mojavemys
  - †Mojavemys alexandrae – type locality for species
  - †Mojavemys lophatus
  - †Mojavemys wilsoni
- †Molopophorus
  - †Molopophorus aequicostatus – or unidentified comparable form
  - †Molopophorus antiquatus
  - †Molopophorus biplicatus
  - †Molopophorus californicus – type locality for species
  - †Molopophorus dalli
  - †Molopophorus tejonensis
- Moniliopsis
  - †Moniliopsis incisa
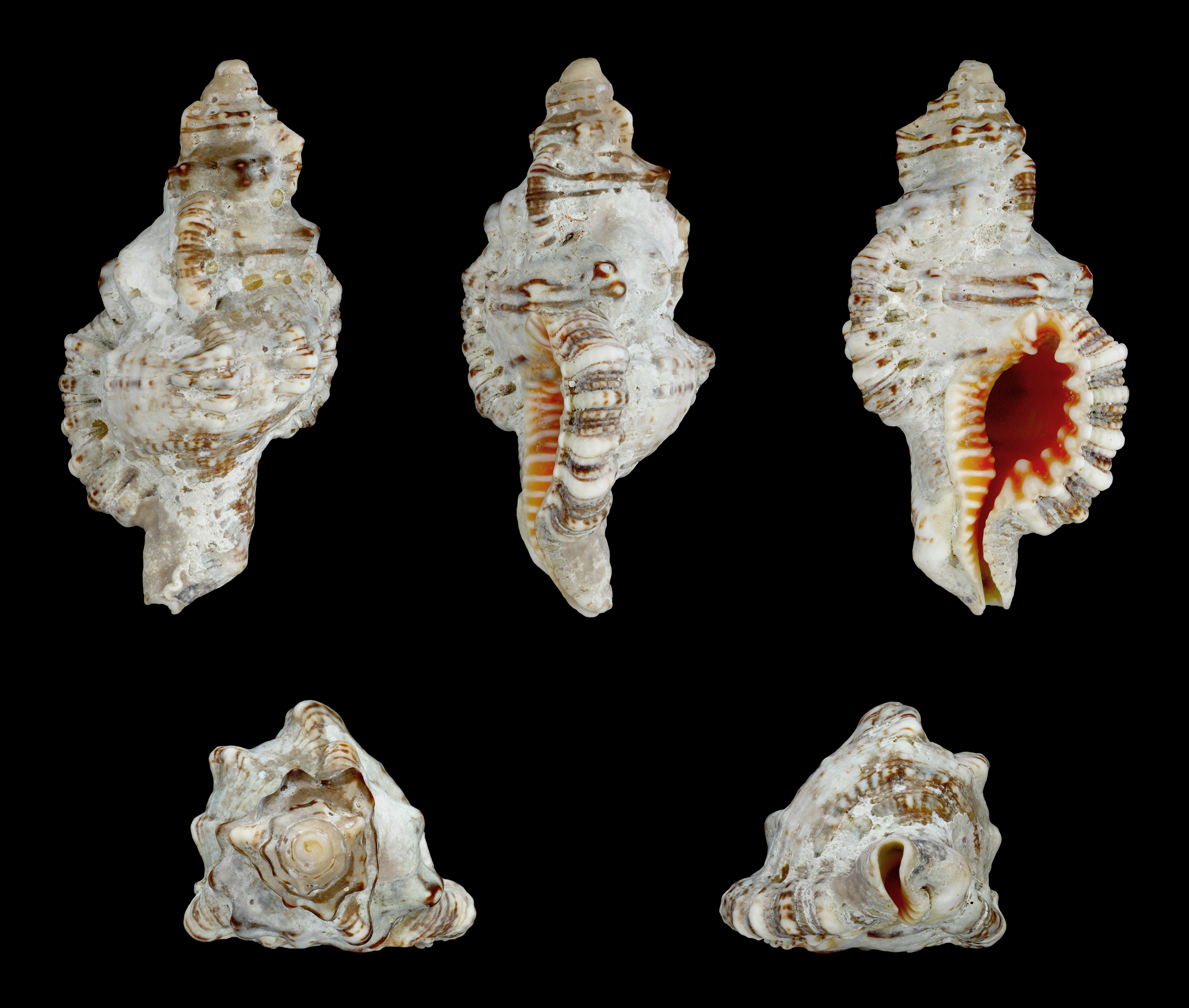
- Shell in multiple views of a Monoplex triton sea snail
  Monoplex
  - †Monoplex amictus
- †Monosaulax
  - †Monosaulax pansus
- Montipora
- †Mookomys
  - †Mookomys formicarum
  - †Mookomys subtilis
- Mopalia
  - †Mopalia acuta
  - †Mopalia ciliata
  - †Mopalia lignosa – or unidentified comparable form
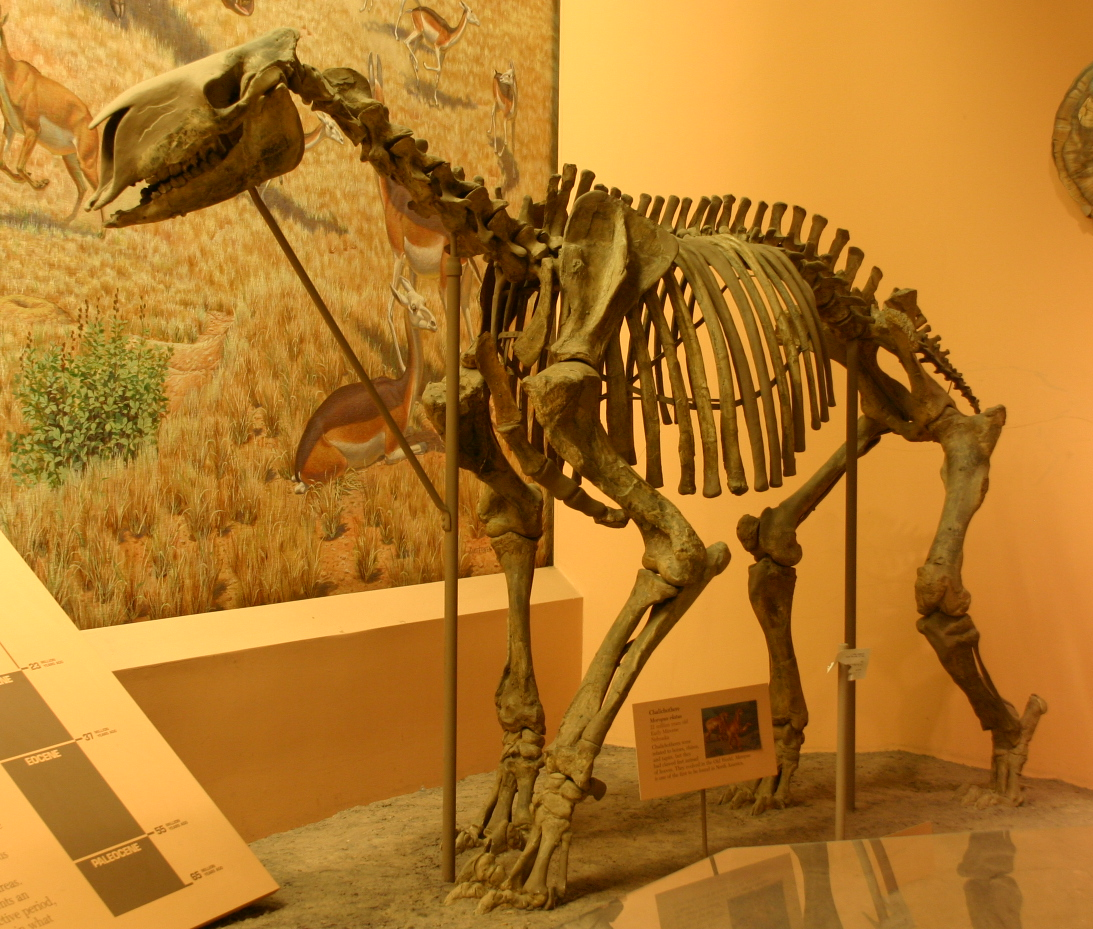
- Mounted fossilized skeleton of the Miocene chalicothere mammal Moropus
  †Moropus
- Morula
  - †Morula lugubris
- Morus – or unidentified comparable form
- Morus
  - †Morus humeralis – type locality for species
  - †Morus lompocanus – type locality for species
  - †Morus magnus – type locality for species
  - †Morus recentior – type locality for species
  - †Morus reyana – type locality for species
  - †Morus reyma
  - †Morus reyna
  - †Morus vagabundus – type locality for species
- Mulinia
  - †Mulinia pallida
- Murex – or unidentified related form
  - †Murex mansfieldi – or unidentified related form
- Musculus
- Mustela
  - †Mustela americana – type locality for species
  - †Mustela frenata
- †Mya
  - †Mya dickersoni
  - †Mya fujiei
  - †Mya truncata
- †Myadesma
  - †Myadesma pacifica
- Myctophum
- Myliobatis
  - †Myliobatis californicus
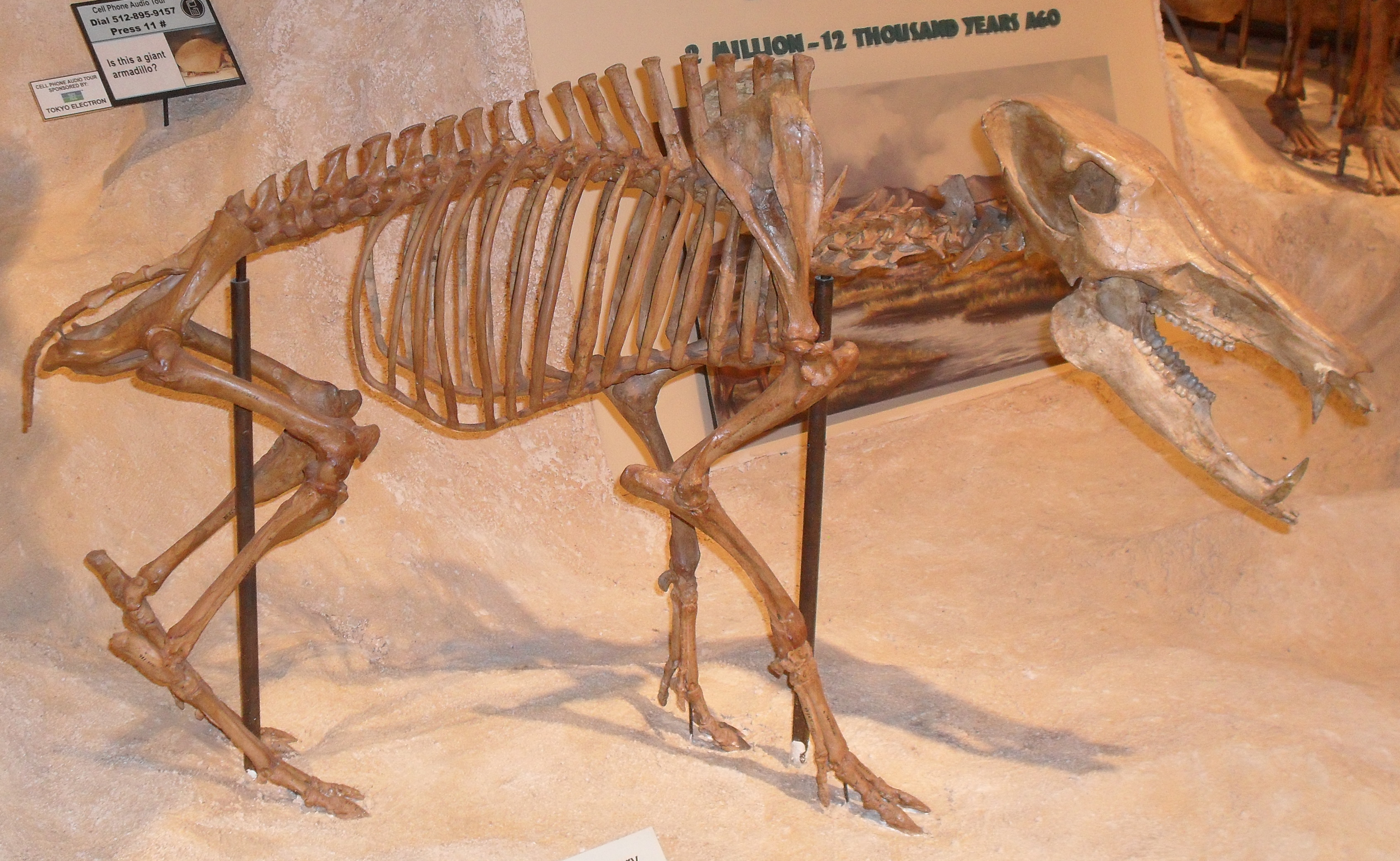
- Fossilized skeleton of the Pliocene-Holocene peccary Mylohyus
  †Mylohyus
  - †Mylohyus fossilis
- †Mylopharodon
  - †Mylopharodon conocephalus
- Mysella
  - †Mysella aleutica
- Mytilimeria
  - Mytilimeria nuttalli
- Mytilus
  - †Mytilus arnoldi
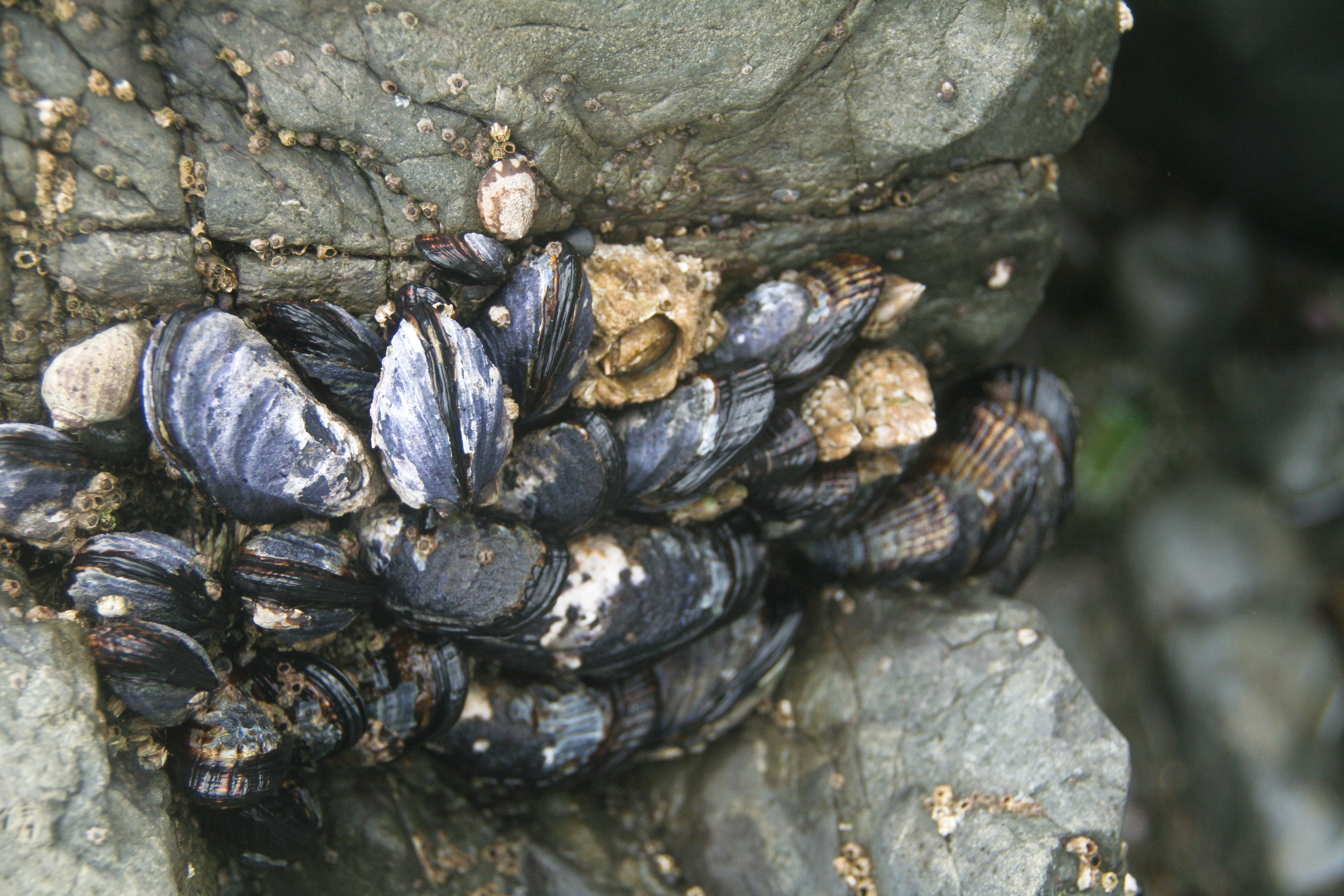
  - Living Mytilus californianus, or california mussels
    †Mytilus californianus
  - †Mytilus edulis
  - †Mytilus expansus
  - †Mytilus loeli
  - †Mytilus mathewsoni
  - †Mytilus mathewsonii
  - †Mytilus middendorffi
- †Mytonolagus
- †Mytonomys
  - †Mytonomys burkei – type locality for species
  - †Mytonomys mytonensis – or unidentified comparable form
- Myurella
  - †Myurella martini

== N ==
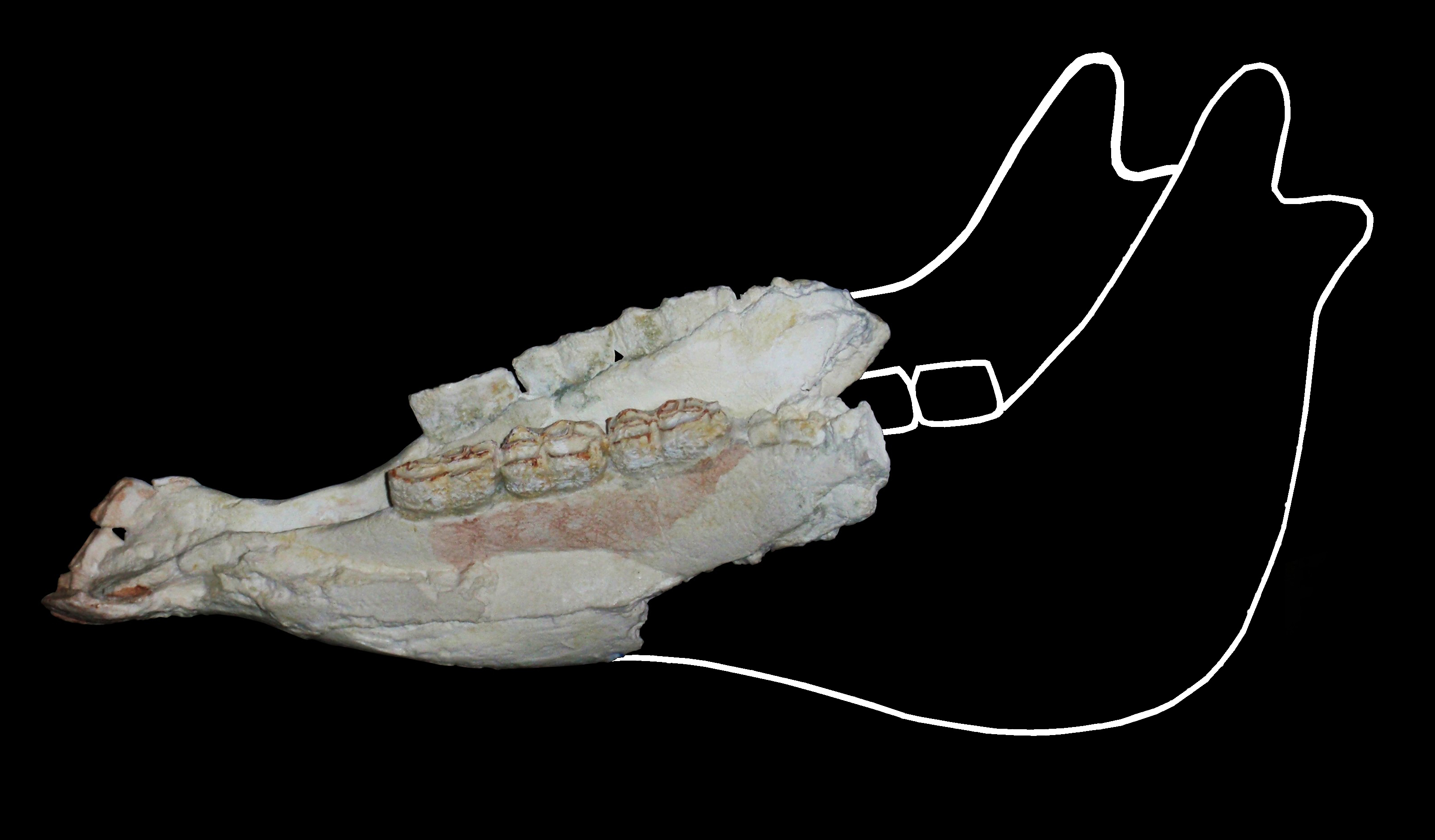
- Partial fossilized mandible of the Miocene-Pliocene horse Nannippus
  †Nannippus
- †Nannocetus – type locality for genus
  - †Nannocetus eremus – type locality for species
- †Nannolithax – type locality for genus
  - †Nannolithax gracilis – type locality for species
- †Nanotragulus
  - †Nanotragulus ordinatus – tentative report
- Narona
  - †Narona clavatula
- Nassa
  - †Nassa cerritensis
  - †Nassa delosi
  - †Nassa fossata
  - †Nassa mendica
  - †Nassa perpinguis
  - †Nassa tegula
- Nassarius
  - †Nassarius californianus
  - †Nassarius cerritensis
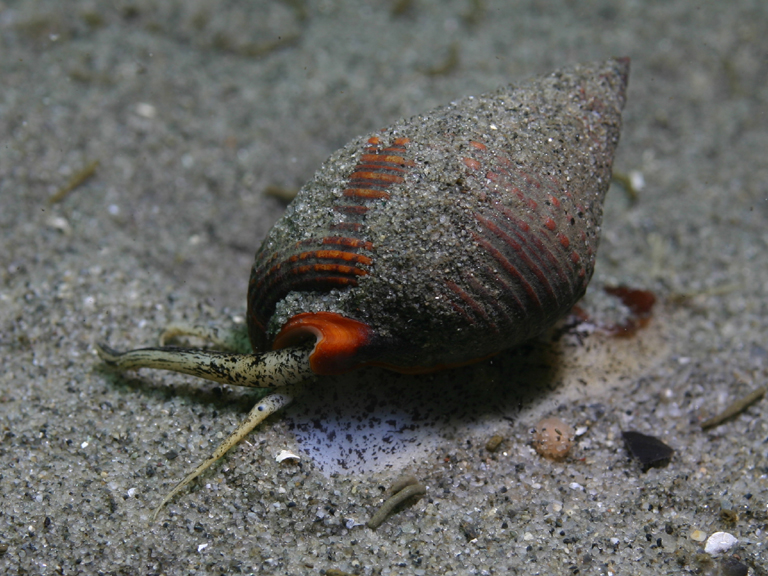
  - A living Nassarius fossatus, or channeled basket snail
    †Nassarius fossatus
  - †Nassarius grammatus
  - †Nassarius hamlini
  - †Nassarius inquus
  - †Nassarius mendicus
  - †Nassarius perpinguis
  - †Nassarius stocki
  - †Nassarius tegula
  - †Nassarius whitneyi
- Natica
  - †Natica lewisi – or unidentified related form
  - †Natica recluziana
  - †Natica uvasana
- Naticarius
  - †Naticarius unifasciata
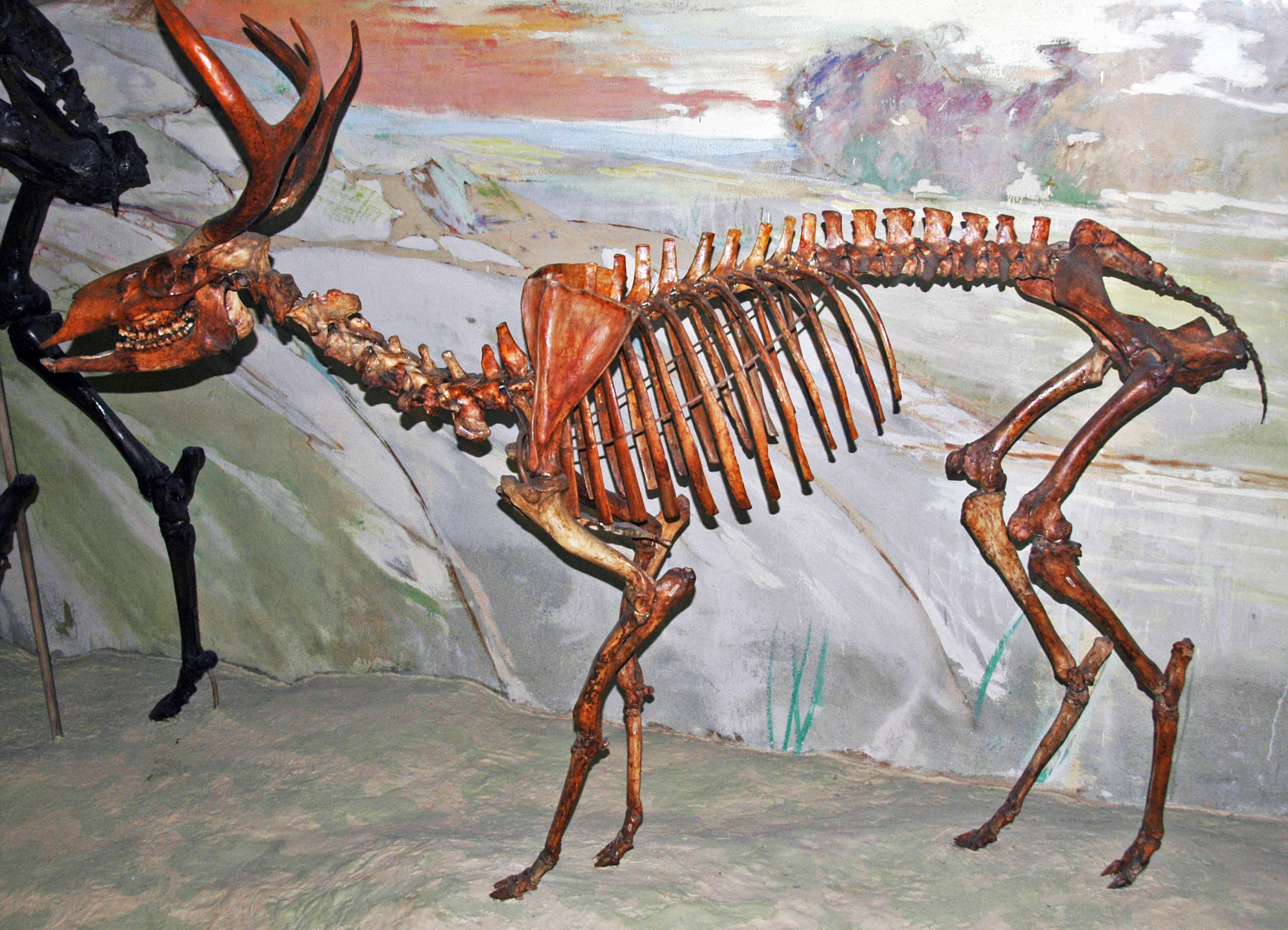
- Mounted fossilized skeleton of the Pleistocene Odocoileus lucasi, or American mountain deer
  †Navahoceros
- Nectandra
  - †Nectandra presanguinea
- Negaprion
  - †Negaprion antiquus
  - †Negaprion elongata – or unidentified comparable form
- †Nekrolagus
- †Nelumbium
  - †Nelumbium lacunosum – type locality for species
- Nemocardium
  - †Nemocardium centifilosum
  - †Nemocardium linteum
- †Neobernaya
  - †Neobernaya fernandoensis
  - †Neobernaya spadicea
- †Neoculicoides – type locality for genus
  - †Neoculicoides jeanneae – type locality for species
- †Neogyps
  - †Neogyps errans
- †Neohipparion
  - †Neohipparion eurystyle
  - †Neohipparion gidleyi – type locality for species
  - †Neohipparion leptode
  - †Neohipparion trampasense
- †Neoliotomus – or unidentified comparable form
- †Neolitsea
  - †Neolitsea lata – type locality for species
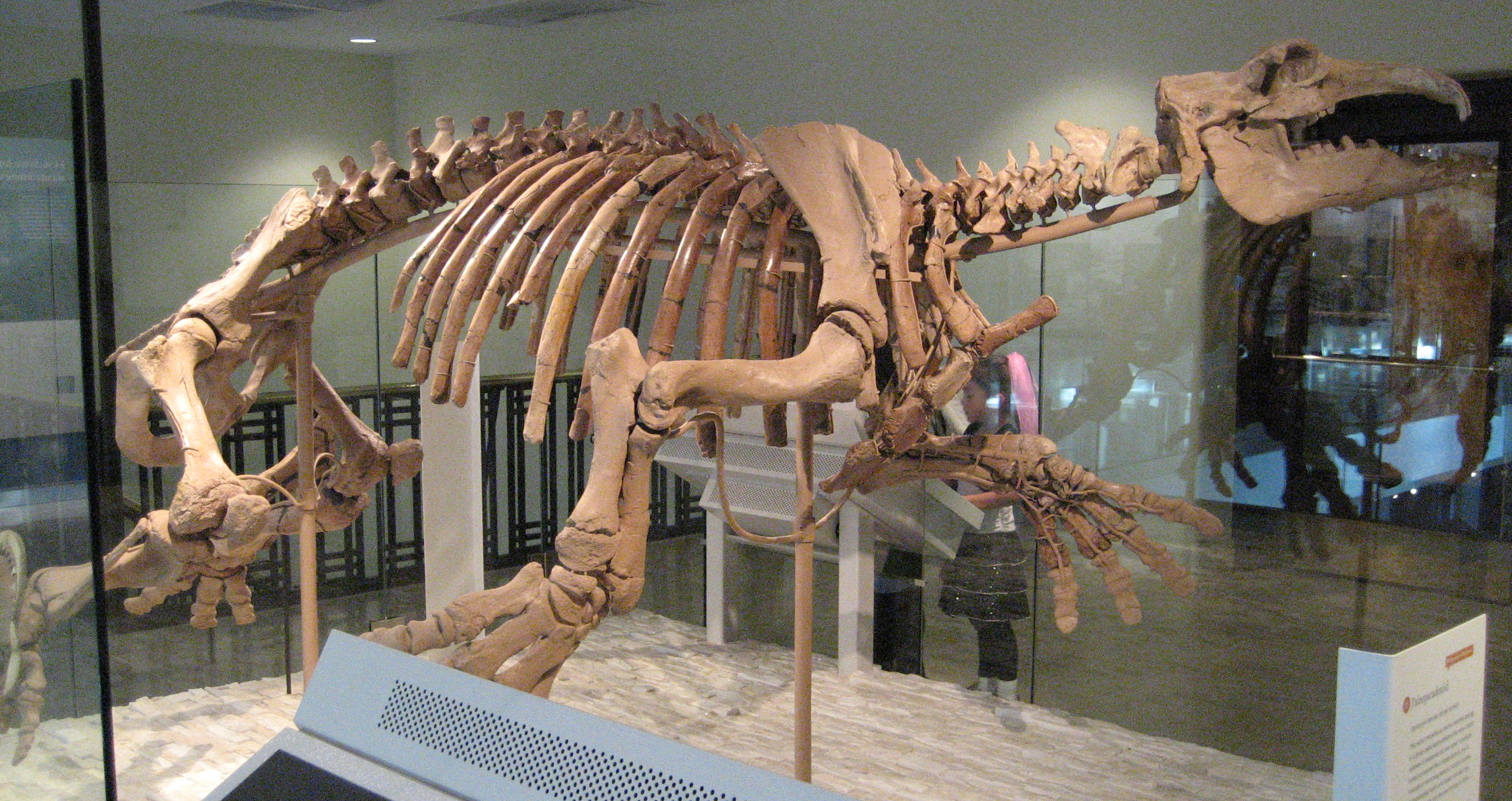
- Mounted fossilized skeleton of the Miocene aquatic mammal Neoparadoxia
  †Neoparadoxia – type locality for genus
  - †Neoparadoxia cecilialina – type locality for species
  - †Neoparadoxia repenningi – type locality for species
- Neophrontops
  - †Neophrontops americanus
- †Neoplagiaulax
- Neotamias
  - †Neotamias senex
- †Neotherium – type locality for genus
  - †Neotherium mirum – type locality for species
- Neotoma
  - †Neotoma cinerea – type locality for species
  - †Neotoma fossilis
  - †Neotoma fuscipes
  - †Neotoma lepida
  - †Neotoma quadriplicata
  - †Neotoma sawrockensis
  - †Neotoma taylori
- Neptunea
  - †Neptunea andersoni
  - †Neptunea eurekaensis
  - †Neptunea lawsoni
  - †Neptunea lirata
  - †Neptunea mucronata
  - †Neptunea pulchra
  - †Neptunea scotiaensis
  - †Neptunea tabiilata – or unidentified comparable form
  - †Neptunea tabulata
- Nerita
  - †Nerita beali – tentative report
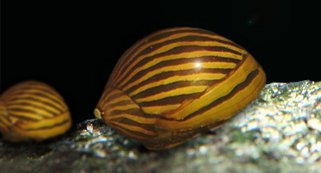
- Living Neritina or nerite snails
  Neritina
  - †Neritina picta
- †Nerium
  - †Nerium hinoidea – type locality for species
- †Nerterogeomys
  - †Nerterogeomys anzensis
  - †Nerterogeomys garbanii
- Neverita
  - †Neverita alta
  - †Neverita callosa
  - †Neverita globosa
  - †Neverita reclusiana
  - †Neverita reclusianus
  - †Neverita recluziana
  - †Neverita recluzianus
  - †Neverita secta – or unidentified comparable form
  - †Neverita thomsonae
- Nicrophorus
  - †Nicrophorus guttula
  - †Nicrophorus marginatus – type locality for species
  - †Nicrophorus nigrita
- †Nimravides
  - †Nimravides thinobates
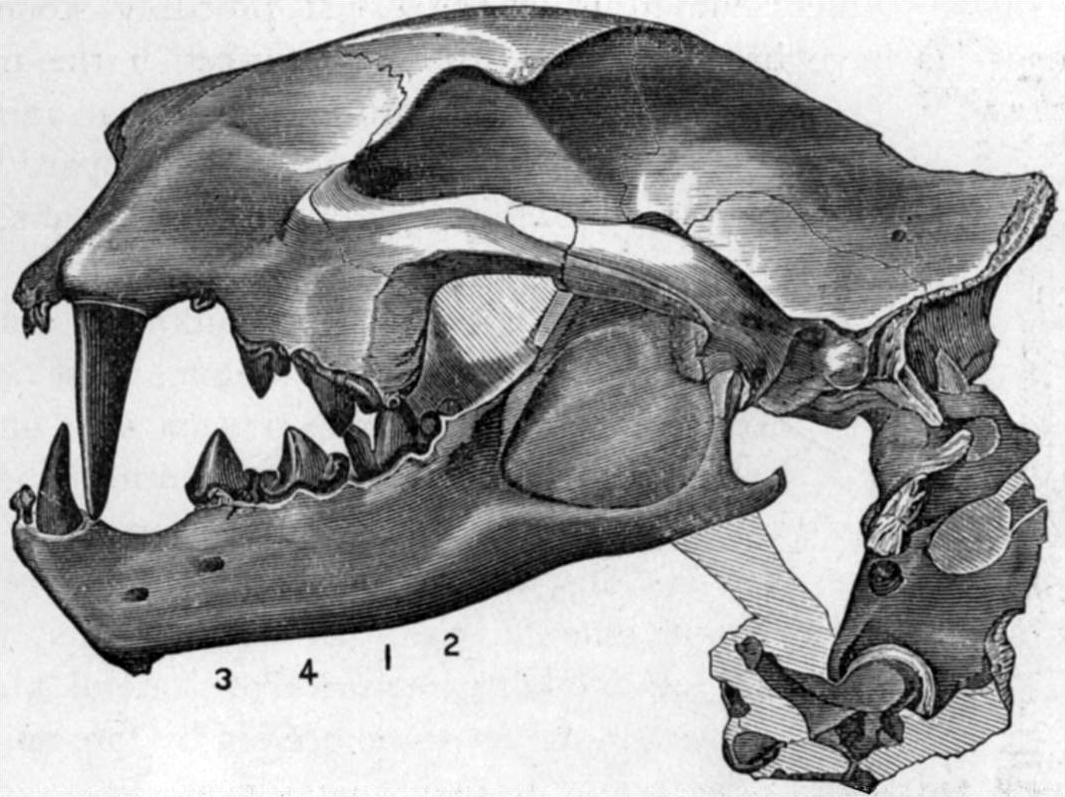
- Illustration of the fossilized skull of the Oligocene false saber-toothed cat Nimravus
  †Nimravus
- Niso – tentative report
  - †Niso antiselli
- †Nitzschia
  - †Nitzschia reinholdi
  - †Nitzschia romana
- Nodipecten
  - †Nodipecten cerrosensis
  - †Nodipecten estrellanus
  - †Nodipecten subnodosus
- Nodogenerina
  - †Nodogenerina adolphina
  - †Nodogenerina advena
  - †Nodogenerina sanctaecrucis
  - †Nodogenerina wegemanni
- Nodosaria
  - †Nodosaria holserica
  - †Nodosaria longiscata
  - †Nodosaria pyrula
- Nonion
  - †Nonion incisum
- †Nonomys
  - †Nonomys gutzleri – type locality for species
- Norrisia
  - †Norrisia norrisii
- †Nothroptheriops
  - †Nothroptheriops shastense – or unidentified comparable form
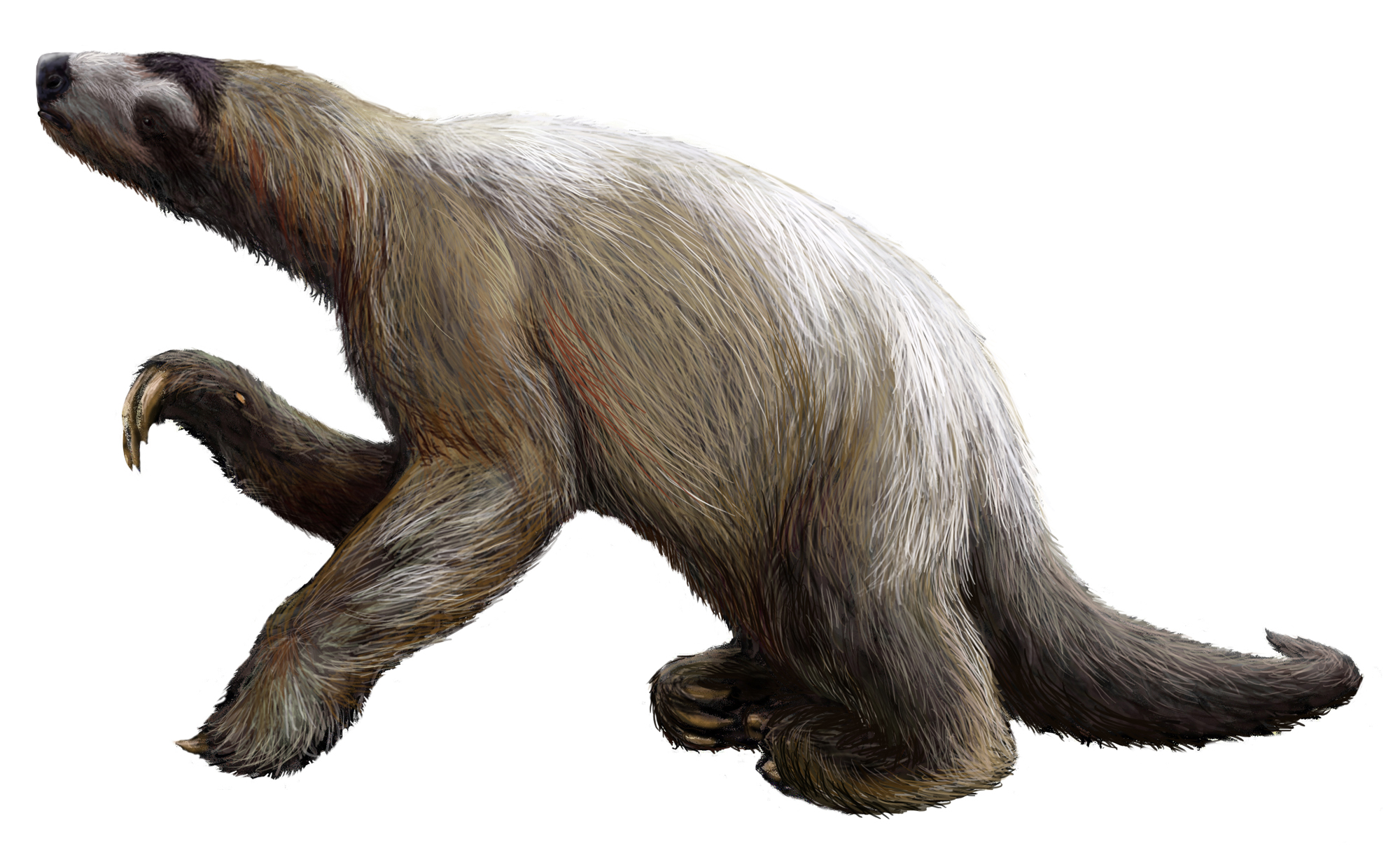
- Life restoration of the Pleistocene ground sloth Nothrotheriops
  †Nothrotheriops
  - †Nothrotheriops texanus
- †Nothrotherium
  - †Nothrotherium shastense – type locality for species
- Notiosorex
  - †Notiosorex crawfordi
  - †Notiosorex jacksoni
- Notoacmea
  - †Notoacmea inessa
- Notorhynchus
- †Nototamias
- Nucella
  - †Nucella elsmerensis
  - †Nucella emarginata
  - †Nucella lamellosa
  - †Nucella lima
  - †Nucella spirata
  - †Nucella trancosana
- Nucula
  - †Nucula exigua
  - †Nucula gabbiana
  - †Nucula washingtonensis
- Nuculana
  - †Nuculana gabbi – or unidentified comparable form
  - †Nuculana ochsneri
  - †Nuculana ramonensis
- Numenius
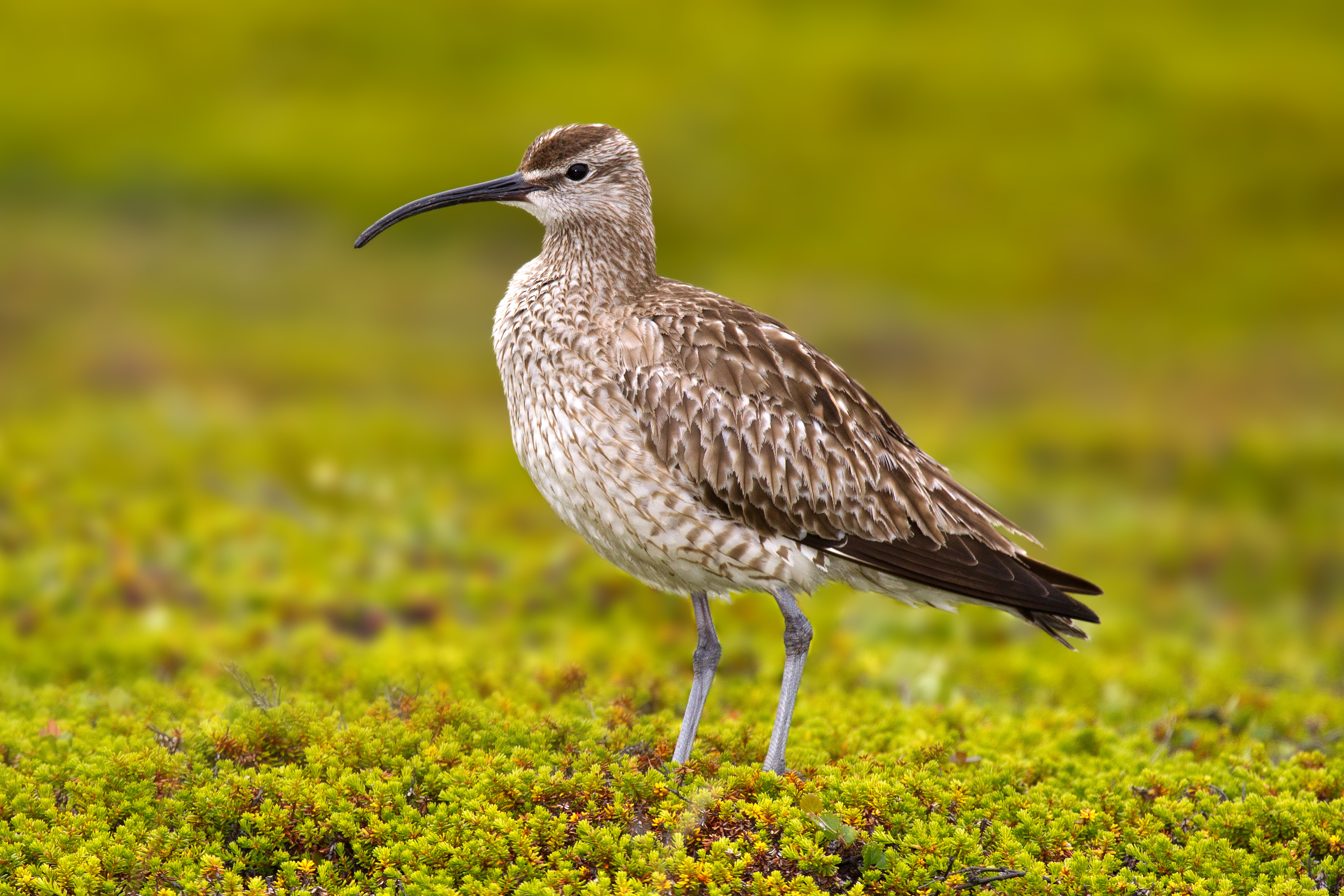
  - A living Numenius phaeopus, or whimbrel
    †Numenius phaeopus
- Nutricola
  - †Nutricola cymata
  - †Nutricola ovalis
  - †Nutricola salmonea
  - †Nutricola tantilla
- Nuttallia
  - †Nuttallia nuttallii
- †Nyctitherium – or unidentified comparable form
- Nyctoporis
  - †Nyctoporis carinata
- †Nyssa
  - †Nyssa californica
  - †Nyssa copeana

== O ==
- †Ocajila – or unidentified comparable form
- Oceanodroma
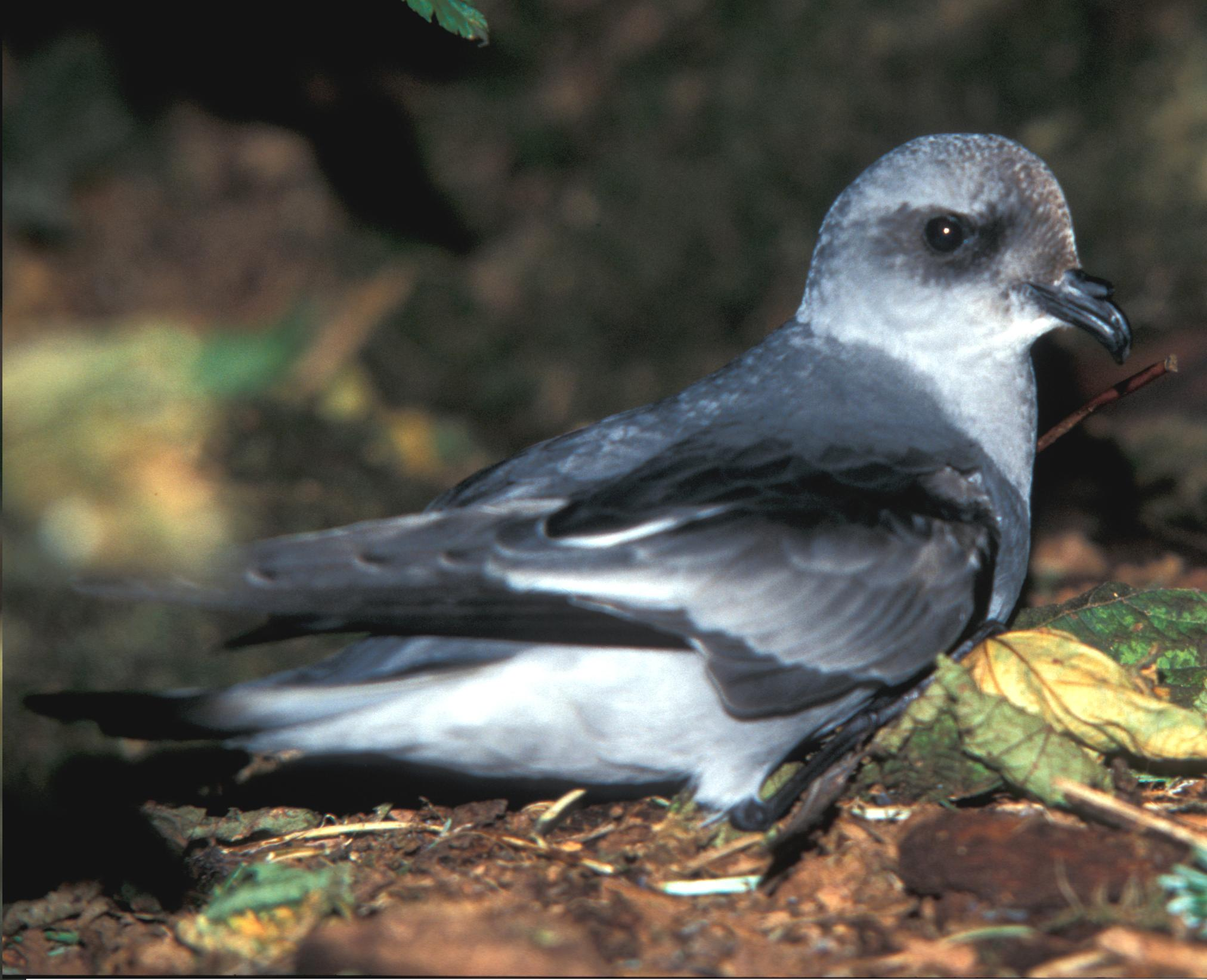
  - A living Oceanodroma furcata, or fork-tailed storm petrel
    †Oceanodroma furcata
  - †Oceanodroma homochroa
  - †Oceanodroma hubbsi – type locality for species
- †Ocenbra
  - †Ocenbra topangensis – or unidentified comparable form
- Ocenebra
  - †Ocenebra barbarensis – or unidentified comparable form
  - †Ocenebra circumtexta
  - †Ocenebra foveolata
  - †Ocenebra interfossa
  - †Ocenebra lurida
  - †Ocenebra poulsoni
  - †Ocenebra tenuisculpta
  - †Ocenebra topangensis
- Ocotea
  - †Ocotea ovoidea
  - †Ocotea perseaformis
- †Ocystias
  - †Ocystias sagitta
- †Odaxosaurus
- Odobenus
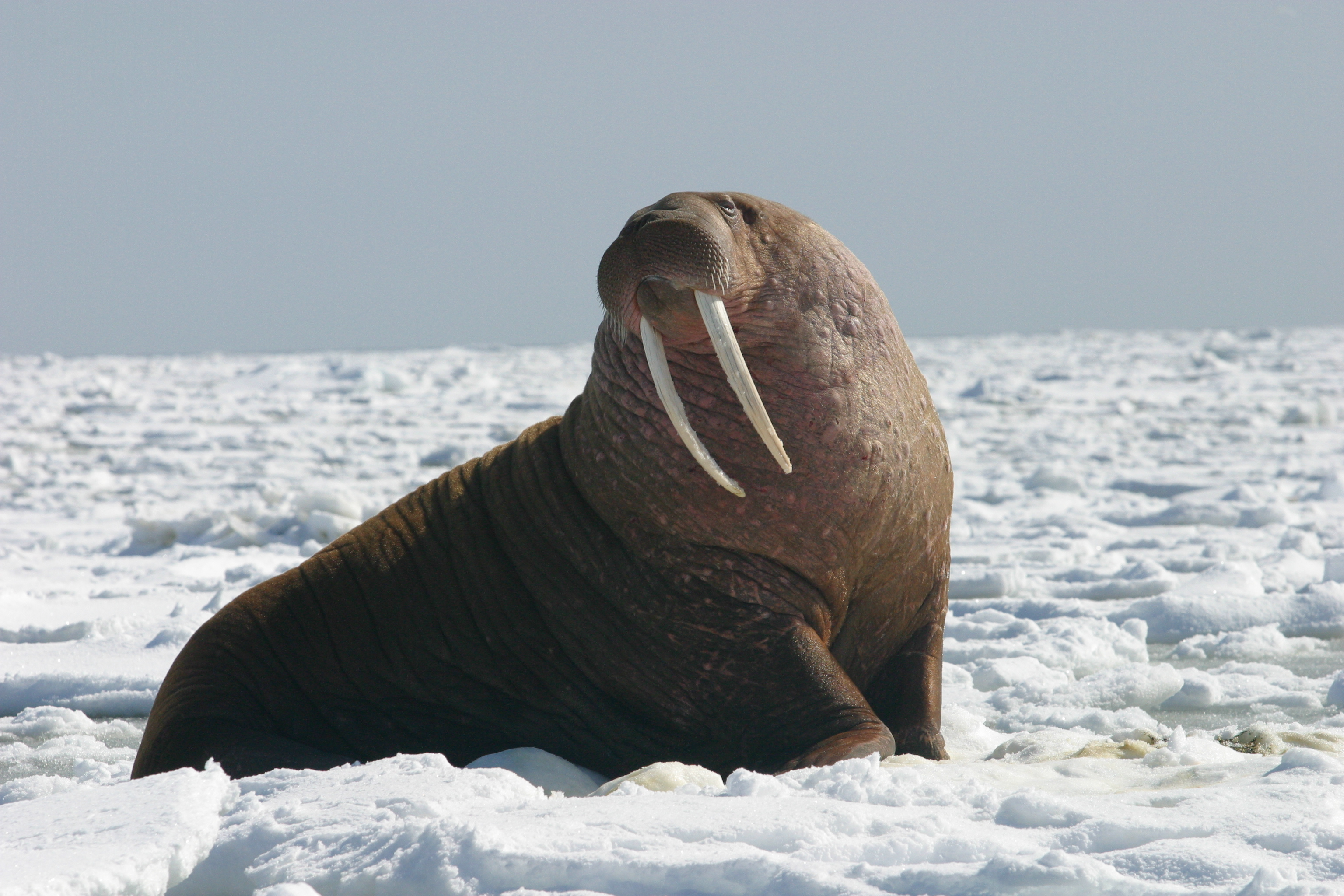
  - A living Odobenus rosmarus, or walrus
    †Odobenus rosmarus
- Odocoileus
  - †Odocoileus hemionus
  - †Odocoileus virginianus – or unidentified comparable form
- Odontaspis
  - †Odontaspis ferox
- †Odontogryphaea – tentative report
  - †Odontogryphaea haleyi
- Odostomia
  - †Odostomia avellana
  - †Odostomia beringi – or unidentified comparable form
  - †Odostomia californica – or unidentified comparable form
  - †Odostomia callimene – or unidentified related form
  - †Odostomia columbiana – or unidentified comparable form
  - †Odostomia diaboli
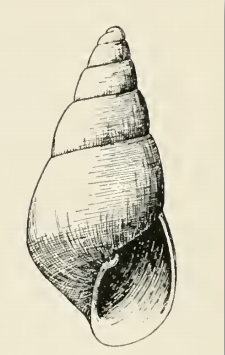
  - Illustration of the shell of an Odostomia donilla pyram shell sea snail
    †Odostomia donilla
  - †Odostomia eugena
  - †Odostomia farallonensis
  - †Odostomia fetella
  - †Odostomia gravida
  - †Odostomia helena
  - †Odostomia minutissima – or unidentified comparable form
  - †Odostomia nemo
  - †Odostomia nota
  - †Odostomia stephensae
  - †Odostomia tacomoensis
  - †Odostomia tenuisculpta – or unidentified comparable form
- †Oedolithax – type locality for genus
  - †Oedolithax mira – type locality for species
- Oenopota
  - †Oenopota fidicula
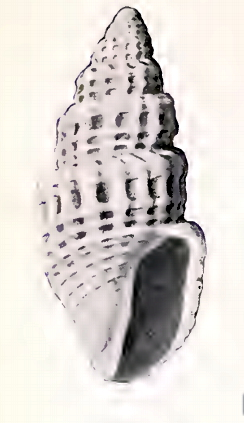
  - Illustration of the shell of an Oenopota tabulata sea snail
    †Oenopota tabulata
- Ogmodontomys
  - †Ogmodontomys sawrockensis
- †Olequahia
  - †Olequahia domenginica
  - †Olequahia lorenzana
- †Oligoryctes
- Oliva
  - †Oliva californica
  - †Oliva meganosensis – type locality for species
  - †Oliva spicata
- Olivella
  - †Olivella baetica
  - †Olivella biplicata
  - †Olivella gracilis
  - †Olivella mathewsoni
  - †Olivella mathewsonii
  - †Olivella pedroana
  - †Olivella santana – type locality for species
- †Omomys
  - †Omomys carteri – or unidentified comparable form
- Oncorhynchus
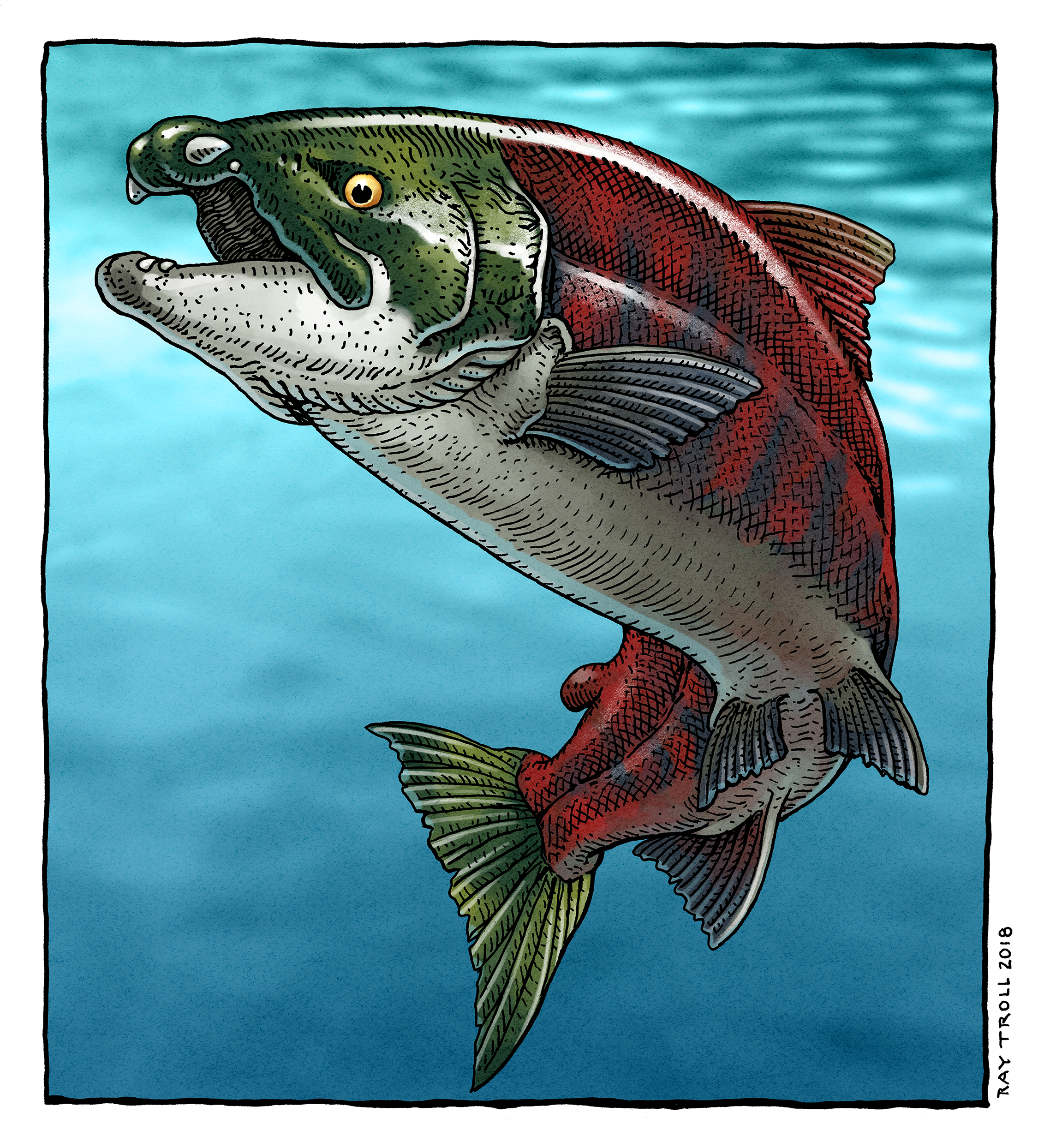
  - Life restoration of a school of the Miocene-Pleistocene Oncorhynchus rastrosus, or saber-toothed salmon
    †Oncorhynchus rastrosus
- Ondatra
  - †Ondatra idahoensis
  - †Ondatra minor
- Oneirodes
- Onthophagus
  - †Onthophagus everestae – type locality for species
- Onychomys
  - †Onychomys gidleyi
  - †Onychomys torridus
- Ophiodermella
  - †Ophiodermella graciosana
  - †Ophiodermella inermis
- †Ophiomys
  - †Ophiomys parvus
- †Opisima – tentative report
  - †Opisima pacifica – or unidentified comparable form
- †Opisthonema
  - †Opisthonema palosverdensis – type locality for species
- Oreamnos
  - †Oreamnos americanus
- Oreortyx
  - †Oreortyx picta
- Orthemis
  - †Orthemis ferruginea
- Orthodon
- †Osbornodon
  - †Osbornodon fricki
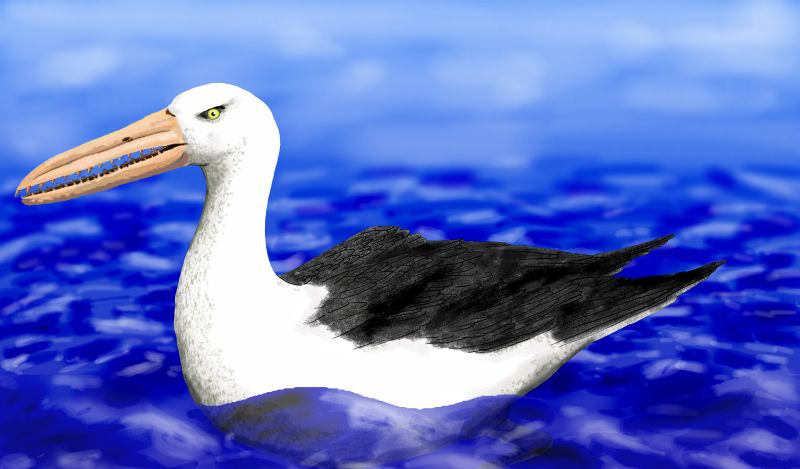
- Life restoration of the Miocene pseudo-toothed bird Osteodontornis
  †Osteodontornis – type locality for genus
  - †Osteodontornis orri – type locality for species
- Ostrea
  - †Ostrea angelica
  - †Ostrea atwoodii
  - †Ostrea bourgeosi
  - †Ostrea conchaphila
  - †Ostrea hertleini
  - †Ostrea lincolnensis – or unidentified related form
  - †Ostrea lurida
  - †Ostrea subtitan
  - †Ostrea weaveri
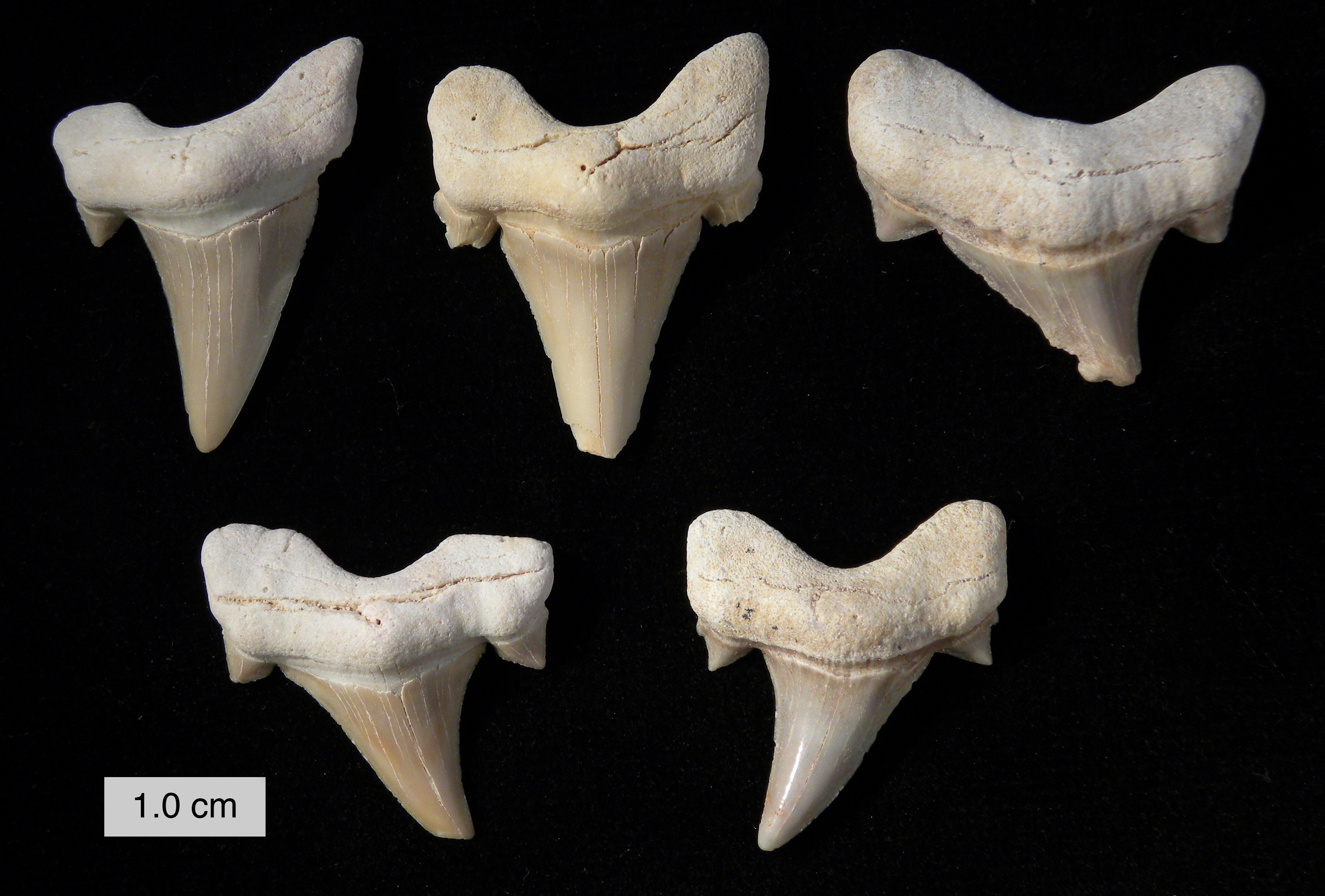
- Fossilized teeth of the Paleocene–Miocene shark Otodus
  †Otodus
  - †Otodus angustidens
  - †Otodus megalodon
- †Ottoceros
  - †Ottoceros peacevalleyensis – type locality for species
- Otus
  - †Otus asio
- †Ourayia
- Ovibos
  - †Ovibos moschatus
- Ovis
  - †Ovis canadensis
- †Oxyrhina
  - †Oxyrhina crassa
- †Oxyura
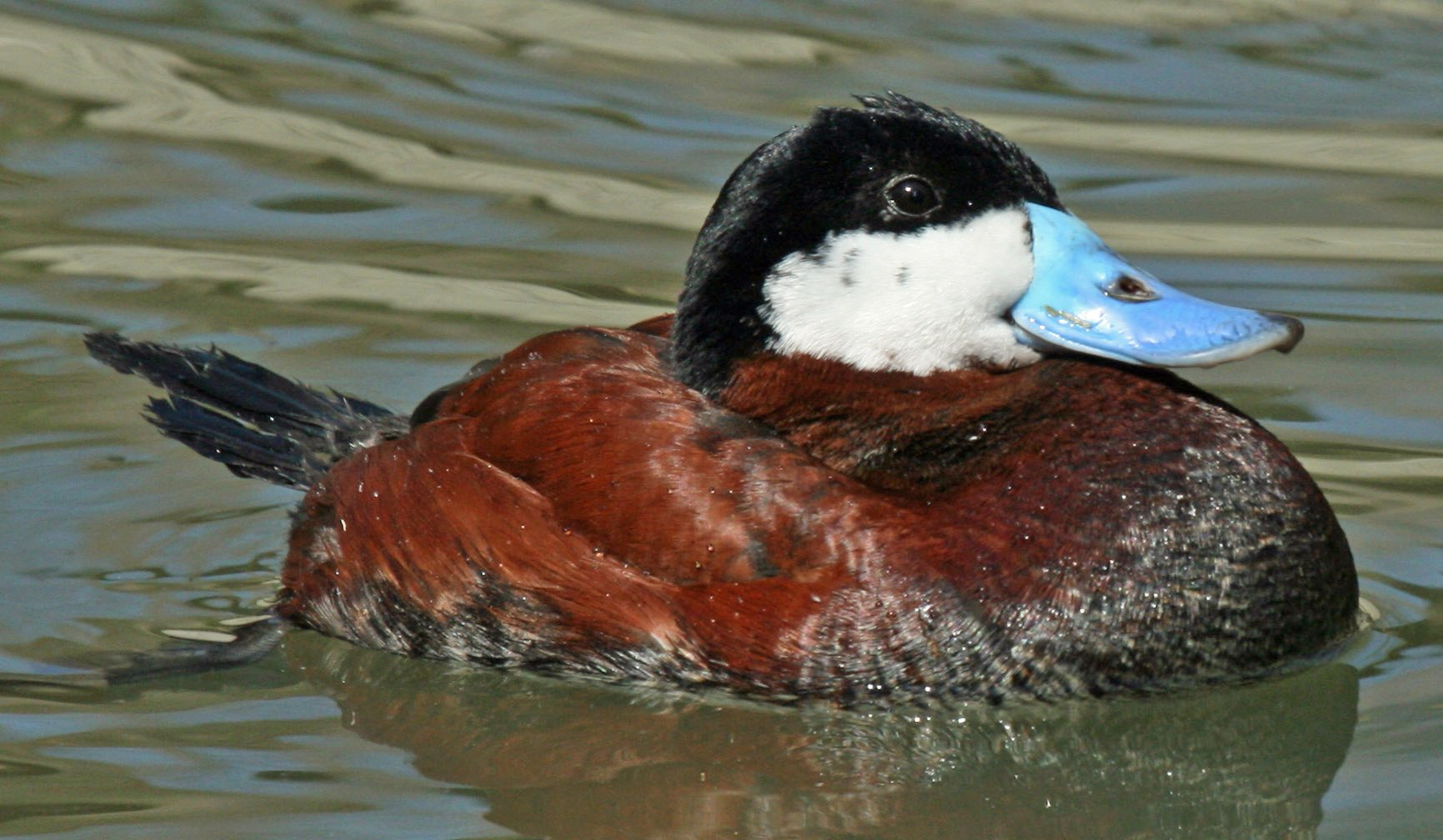
  - A living Oxyura jamaicensis, or ruddy duck
    †Oxyura jamaicensis
- †Ozymandias – type locality for genus
  - †Ozymandias gilberti – type locality for species

== P ==
- †Pachycrommium
  - †Pachycrommium clarki
- †Paciculus
- †Pacifichelys
  - †Pacifichelys hutchisoni – type locality for species
- †Pacipecten
  - †Pacipecten discus
  - †Pacipecten pabloensis – or unidentified comparable form
- †Palaeolagus
- †Palaeolama
  - †Palaeolama mirifica – or unidentified related form
- †Palaeopsammia
  - †Palaeopsammia zitteli
- †Palaeoxantusia
  - †Palaeoxantusia allisoni
  - †Palaeoxantusia kyrentos
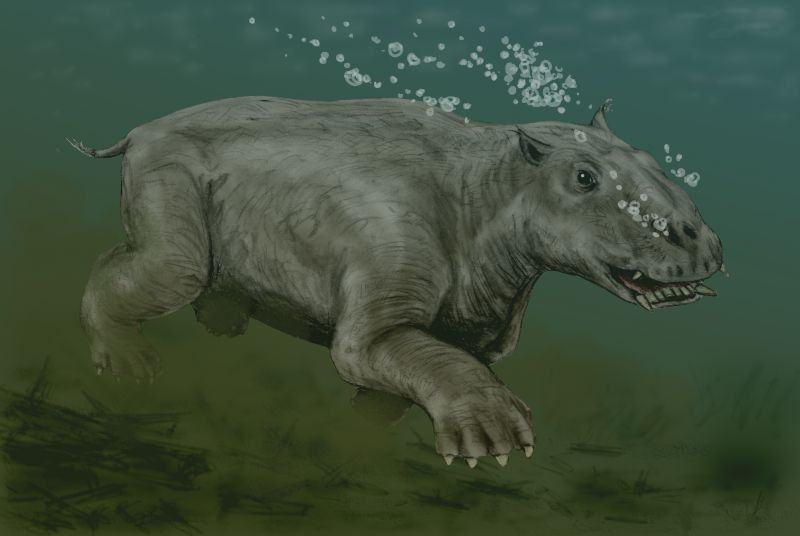
- Restoration of the Miocene aquatic mammal Paleoparadoxia
  †Paleoparadoxia
  - †Paleoparadoxia tabatai
- †Paleosula – type locality for genus
  - †Paleosula stocktoni – type locality for species
- Palpomyia – type locality for genus
  - †Palpomyia freyi – type locality for species
  - †Palpomyia multispinosa – type locality for species
  - †Palpomyia ryshkoffi – type locality for species
  - †Palpomyia shilo – type locality for species
- Pandora
  - †Pandora punctata
  - †Pandora wardiana
- †Panolax
  - †Panolax sanctaefidei
- Panomya
  - †Panomya ampla
- Panopea
  - †Panopea abrupta
  - †Panopea estrellana – or unidentified related form
  - †Panopea ramonensis
  - †Panopea smithii
  - †Panopea tenuis
- Panthera
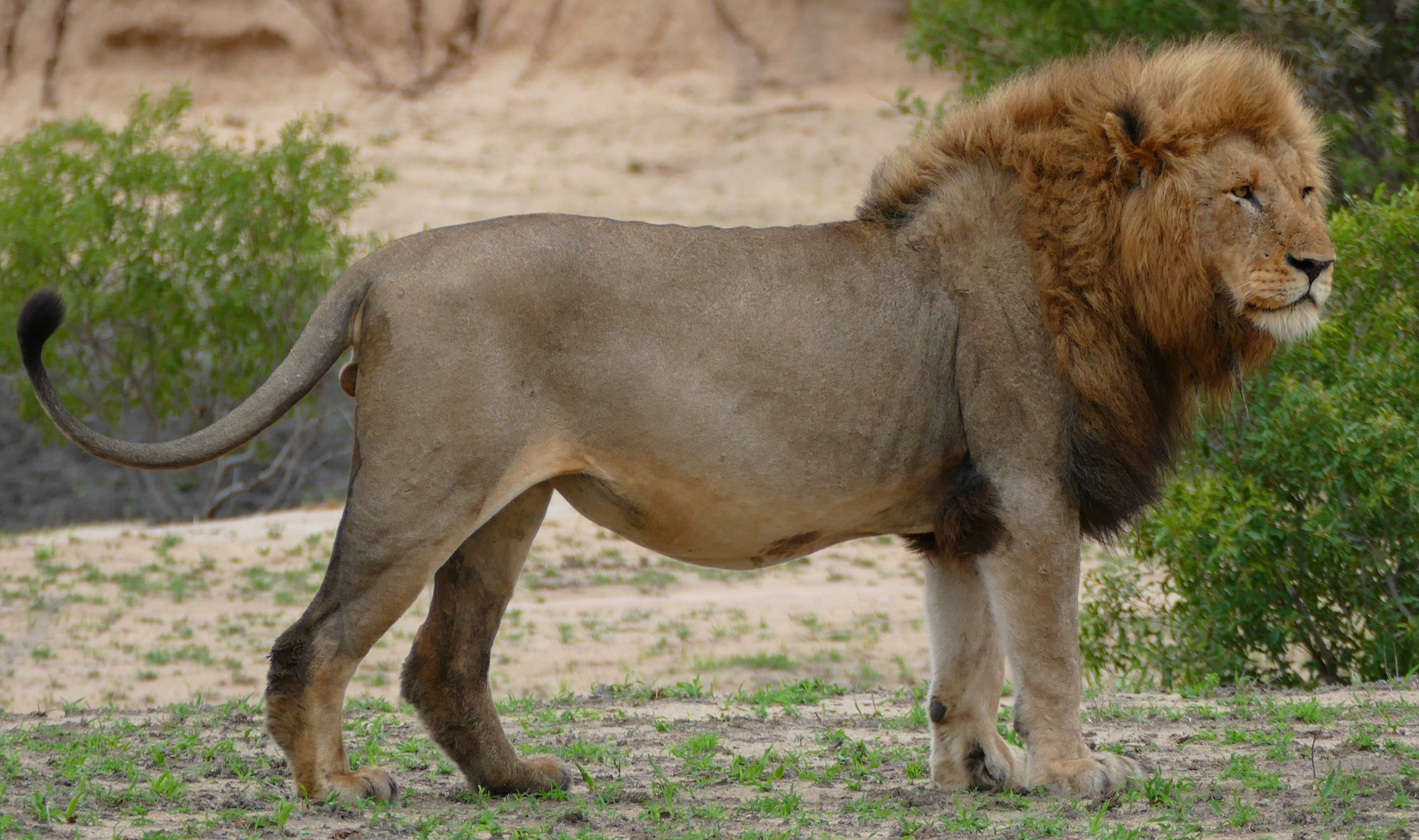
  - A living Panthera leo, or lion
    †Panthera leo
  - †Panthera onca – or unidentified comparable form
- †Parabalaenoptera – type locality for genus
  - †Parabalaenoptera baulinensis – type locality for species
- Paraconcavus
  - †Paraconcavus margaritanus
  - †Paraconcavus pacificus
- †Paracontogenys
  - †Paracontogenys estesi
- †Paracosoryx
  - †Paracosoryx alticornis
  - †Paracosoryx furlongi
- †Paraculicoides – type locality for genus
  - †Paraculicoides rouseae – type locality for species
- Paracyathus
  - †Paracyathus pedroensis – type locality for species
  - †Paracyathus stearnsii
- †Paracynarctus
  - †Paracynarctus kelloggi
- †Paradjidaumo
  - †Paradjidaumo reynoldsi – type locality for species
- †Paradomnina
  - †Paradomnina relictus – or unidentified comparable form
- †Parafundulus
  - †Parafundulus erdisi
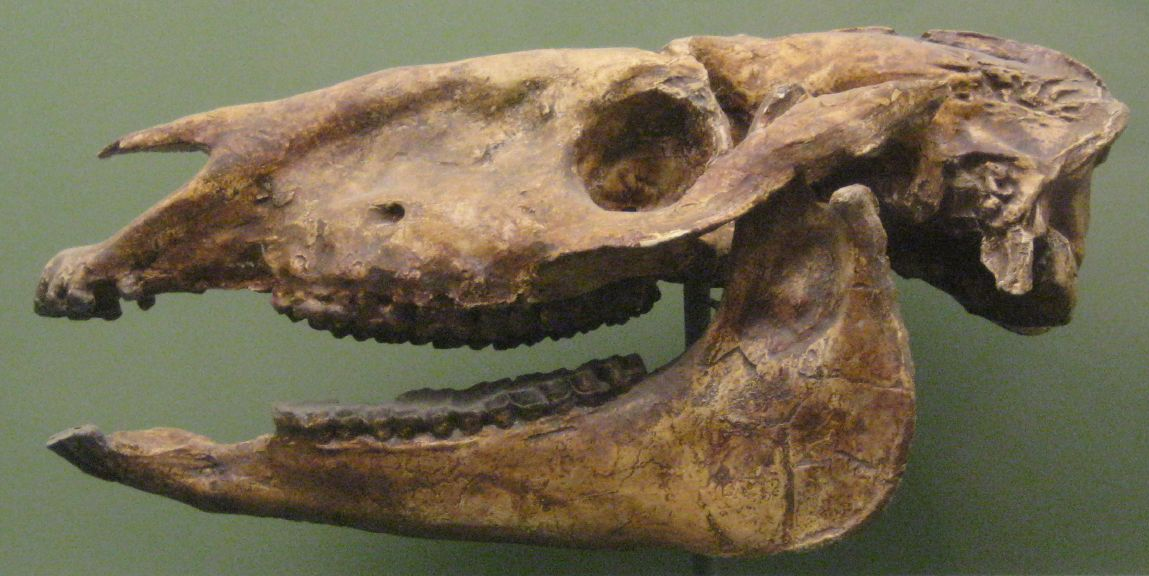
- Fossilized skull of the Miocene horse Parahippus
  †Parahippus
  - †Parahippus maxsoni – type locality for species
  - †Parahippus pawniensis
- †Parahyus
- †Paralichthyes
- Paralichthys – type locality for genus
  - †Paralichthys antiquus
- †Paramerychyus
  - †Paramerychyus harrisonensis
  - †Paramerychyus relictus
- †Paramiolabis
  - †Paramiolabis minutus – type locality for species
  - †Paramiolabis singularis – or unidentified comparable form
  - †Paramiolabis taylori
  - †Paramiolabis tenuis
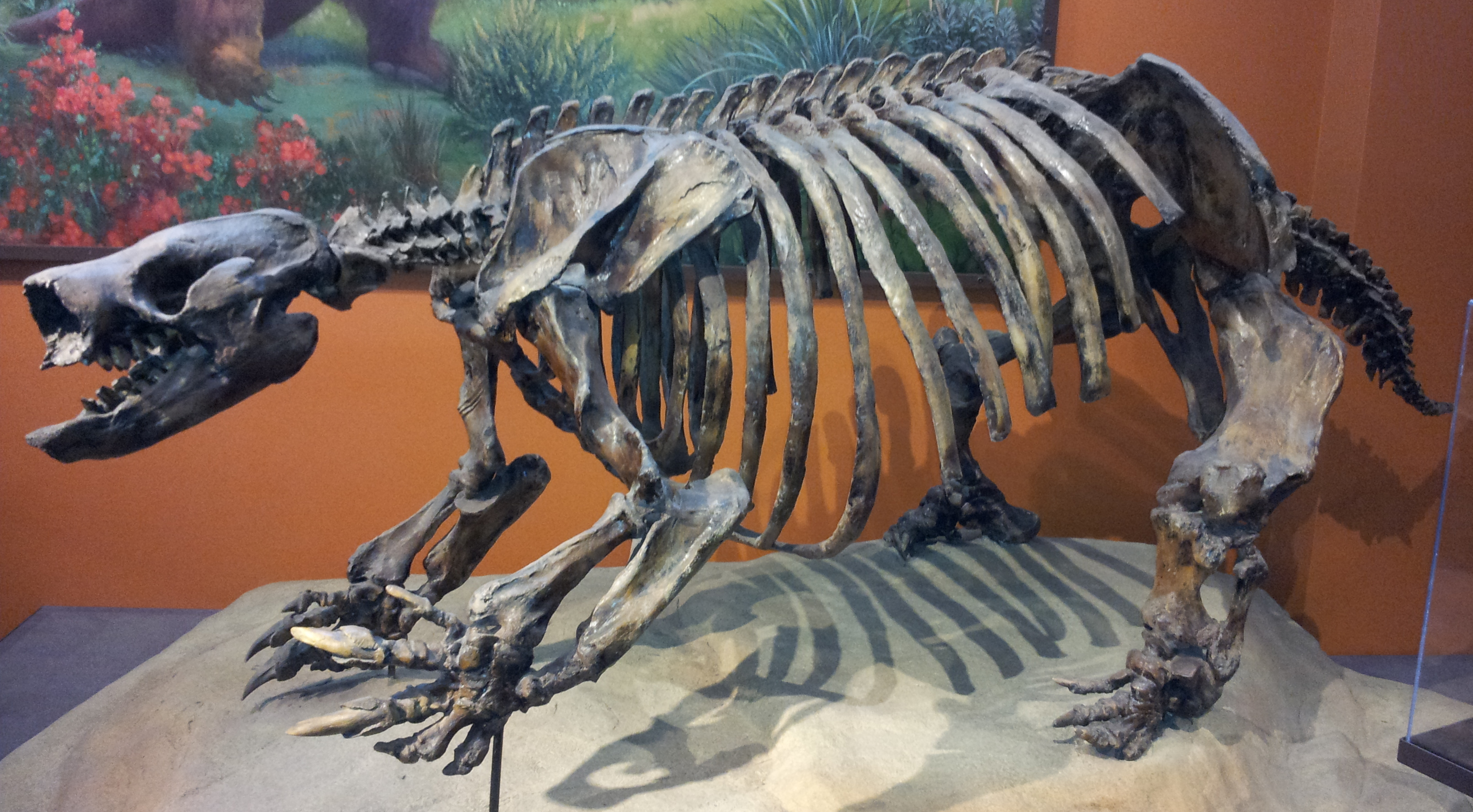
- Fossilized skeleton of the Pliocene-Pleistocene ground sloth Paramylodon
  †Paramylodon
  - †Paramylodon harlani
- †Paramys
  - †Paramys compressidens – or unidentified comparable form
  - †Paramys leptodus – or unidentified comparable form
- †Parapavo
  - †Parapavo californica
  - †Parapavo californicus
- †Parapliohippus
  - †Parapliohippus carrizoensis – type locality for species
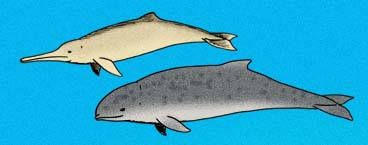
- Life restoration of the Miocene-Pliocene dolphin Parapontoporia (top)
  †Parapontoporia
  - †Parapontoporia sternbergi – type locality for species
  - †Parapontoporia wilsoni – type locality for species
- †Parasauromalus
  - †Parasauromalus olseni
- Paraseraphs
  - †Paraseraphs erraticus
- †Parastylotermes
  - †Parastylotermes calico – type locality for species
  - †Parastylotermes frazieri – type locality for species
- †Paratomarctus
  - †Paratomarctus temerarius
- †Pareumys
  - †Pareumys grangeri
  - †Pareumys milleri
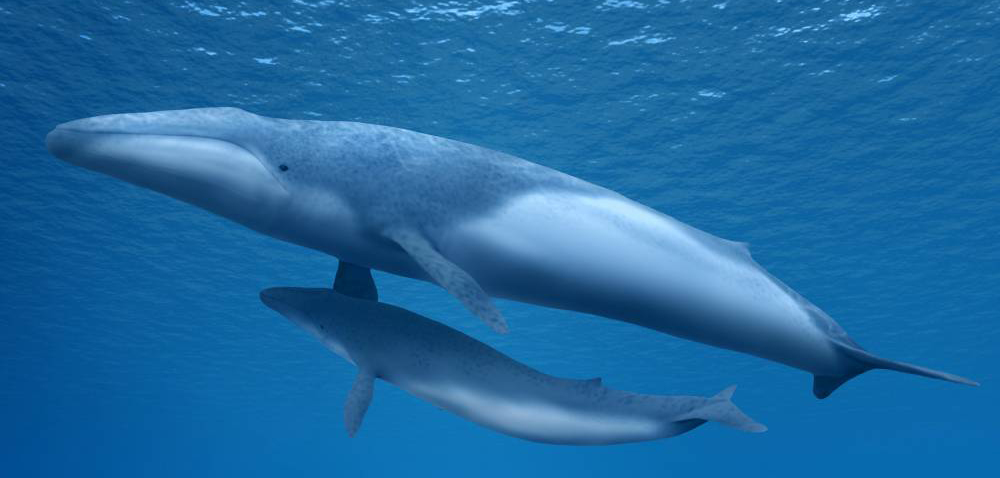
- Life restoration of the Miocene baleen whale Parietobalaena and calf
  †Parietobalaena
  - †Parietobalaena securis – type locality for species
- †Paromomys
  - †Paromomys depressidens
- †Paronychomys
- †Parribacus
  - †Parribacus caesius – type locality for species
- Parvamussium
- †Parvicornus – type locality for genus
  - †Parvicornus occidentalis – type locality for species
- Parvilucina
  - †Parvilucina approximata
  - †Parvilucina tenuisculpta
- †Parvisipho – tentative report
  - †Parvisipho meganosensis – type locality for species
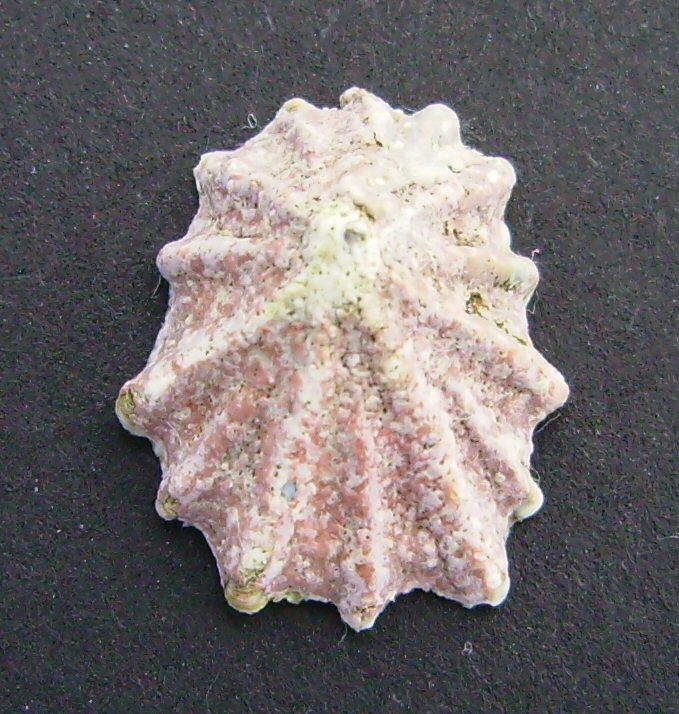
- Shell of a Patelloida limpet
  Patelloida
  - †Patelloida tejonensis
  - †Patelloida triquetrus
- Patinopecten
  - †Patinopecten caurinus
  - †Patinopecten coosensis
  - †Patinopecten healeyi
  - †Patinopecten healyi
  - †Patinopecten lohri
  - †Patinopecten propatulus
- †Patriolestes
  - †Patriolestes novaceki – type locality for species
- †Pauromys
  - †Pauromys lillegraveni – type locality for species
- †Pecoripeda
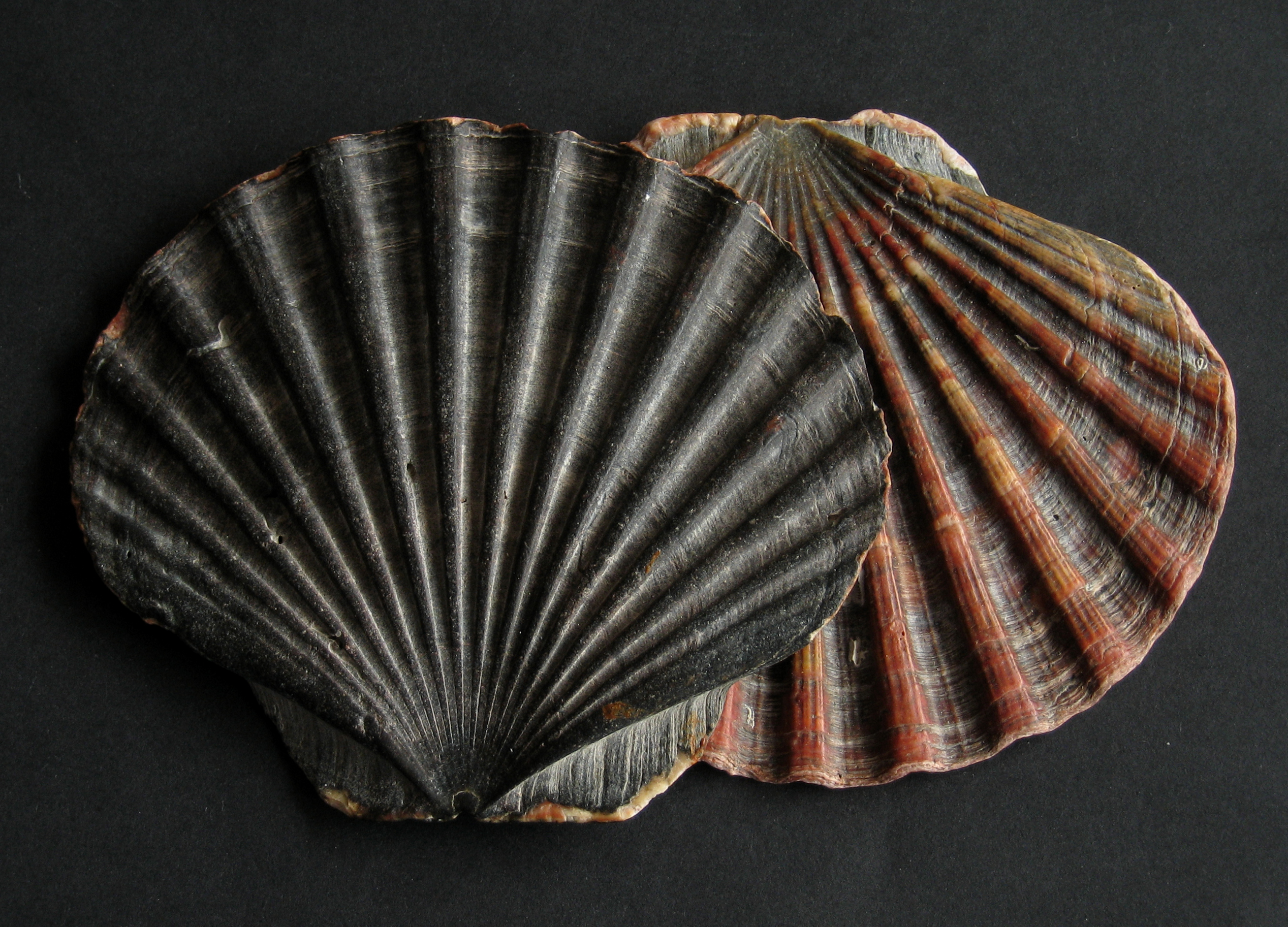
- Pecten
  Pecten
  - †Pecten bellus
  - †Pecten bowersi
  - †Pecten dickersoni
  - †Pecten estrellanis
  - †Pecten magnolia
  - †Pecten nevadensis
  - †Pecten perrini
  - †Pecten sespeensis
- †Pedalion
  - †Pedalion panzana – or unidentified comparable form
- †Pediomeryx
  - †Pediomeryx hemphillensis
- †Pedipes
  - †Pedipes liratus
  - †Pedipes unisulcatus
- †Pelagiarctos – type locality for genus
  - †Pelagiarctos thomasi – type locality for species
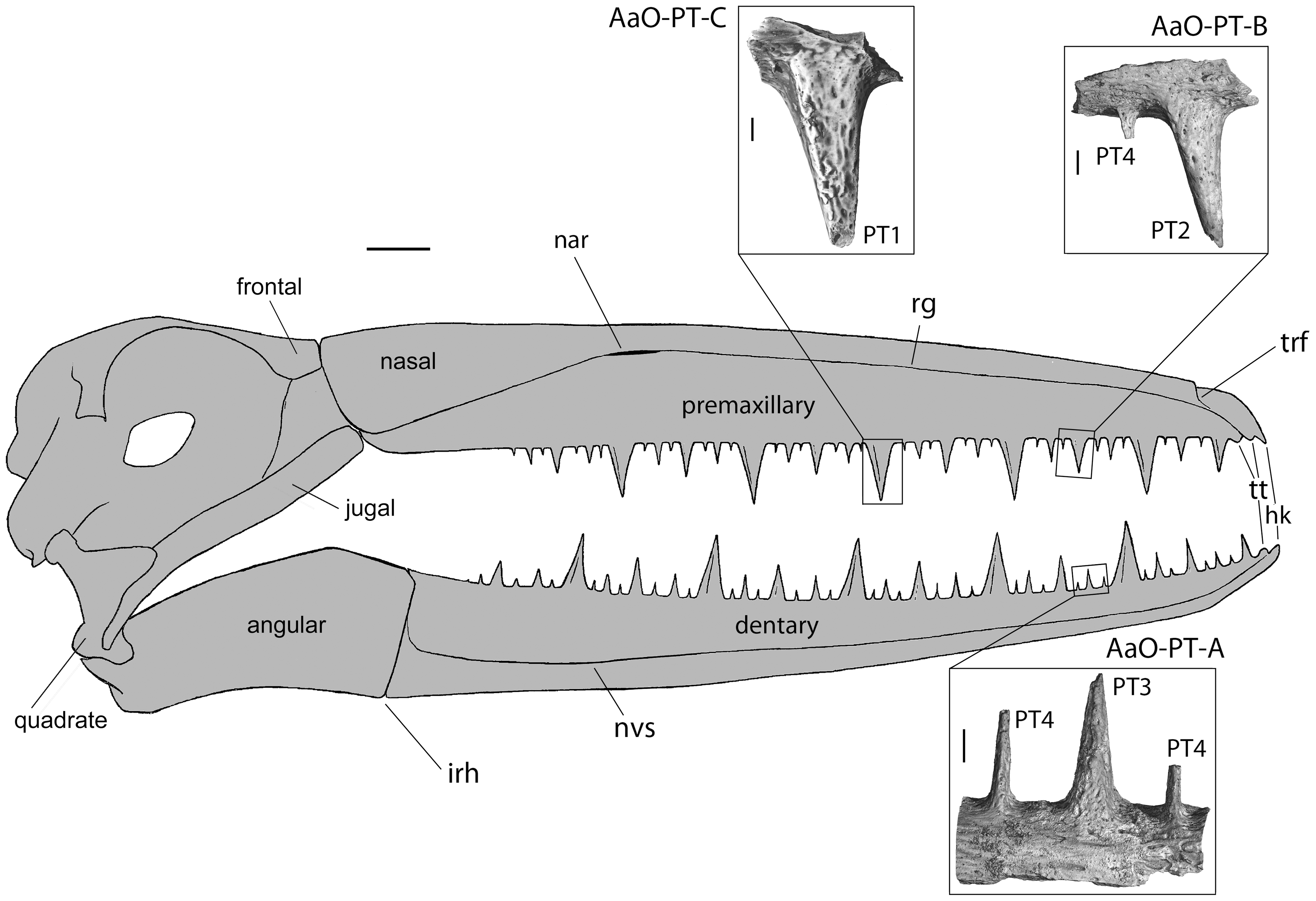
- Reconstructive illustration of a fossilized skull of the Oligocene-Pleistocene pseudo-toothed bird Pelagornis, with close-up insets of its pseudo-teeth
  †Pelagornis
- Pelecanus
  - †Pelecanus erythrorhynchus – or unidentified comparable form
  - †Pelecanus occidentalis
- †Peltosaurus
  - †Peltosaurus macrodon – type locality for species
- Penitella
  - †Penitella penita
- †Peraceras
  - †Peraceras superciliosum
- †Peradectes
  - †Peradectes californicus
- †Periaster
- Pericosmus
- †Peridiomys
  - †Peridiomys oregonensis – or unidentified comparable form
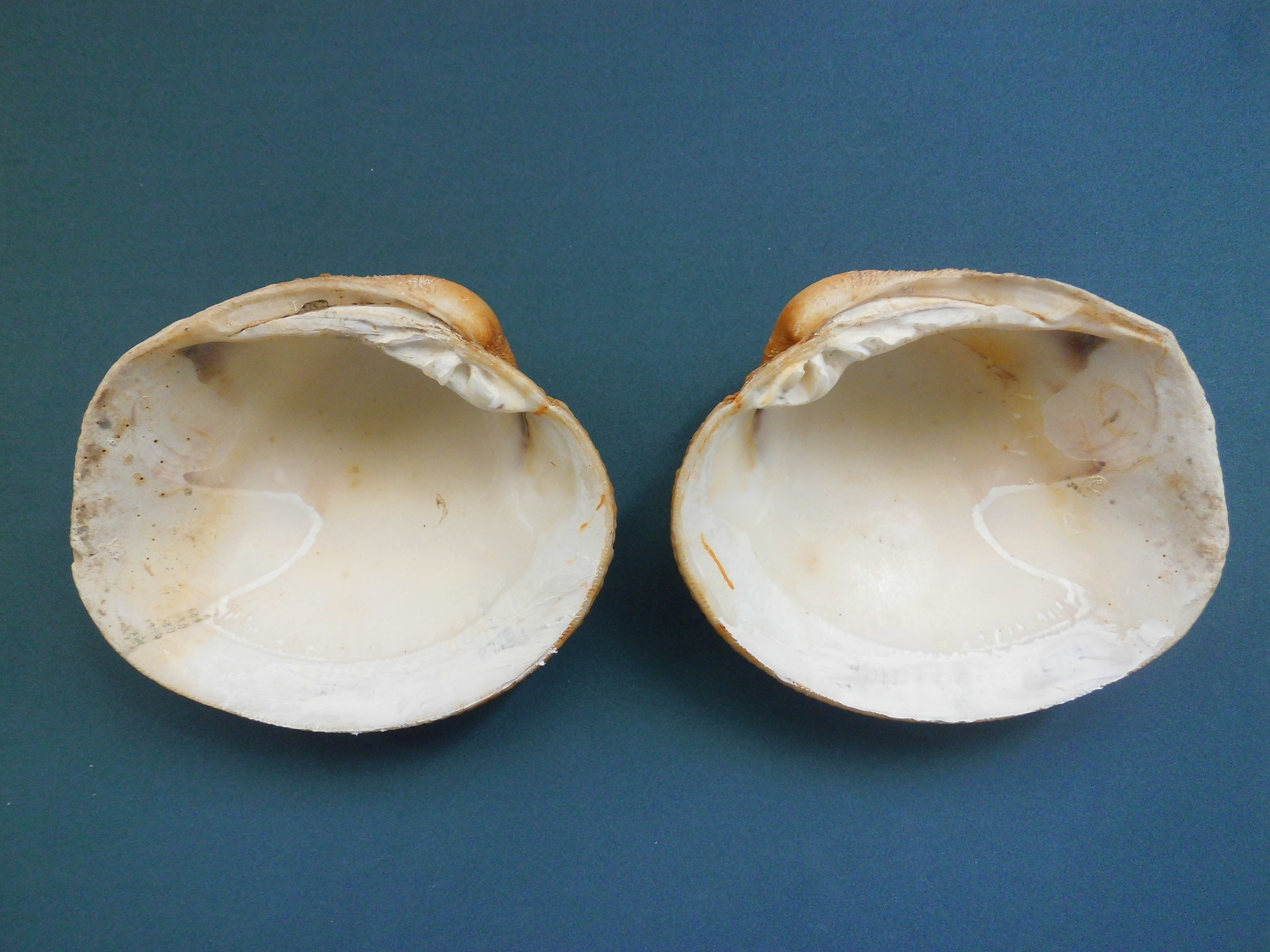
- Interior of the shell of a Periglypta venus clam
  Periglypta
  - †Periglypta multicostata
- Periploma
  - †Periploma planiuscula
  - †Periploma stewartvillensis – type locality for species
- †Peripolocetus – type locality for genus
  - †Peripolocetus vexillifer – type locality for species
- †Perissitys
  - †Perissitys stewarti
- †Perissolax
  - †Perissolax blakei
  - †Perissolax tricarinatus
- †Perognathoides
  - †Perognathoides eurekensis
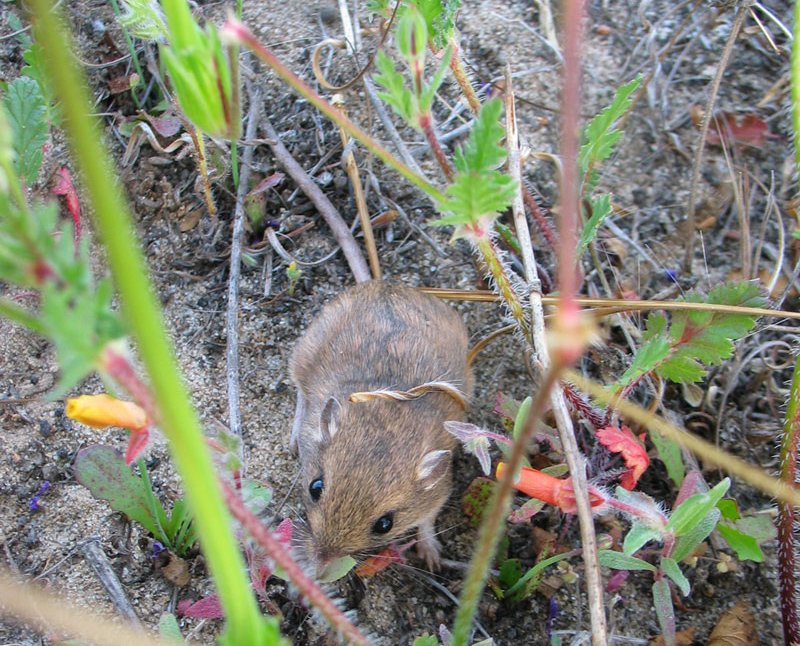
- A living Perognathus pocket mouse
  Perognathus
  - †Perognathus furlongi
  - †Perognathus minutus
- Peromyscus
  - †Peromyscus baumgartneri
  - †Peromyscus boylei
  - †Peromyscus complexus – type locality for species
  - †Peromyscus dentalis
  - †Peromyscus hagermanensis
  - †Peromyscus irvingtonensis – type locality for species
  - †Peromyscus maximus – type locality for species
  - †Peromyscus truei – or unidentified comparable form
- †Perse
  - †Perse lincolnensis
- Persea
  - †Persea coalingensis
  - †Persea praelingue
  - †Persea pseudocarolinensis
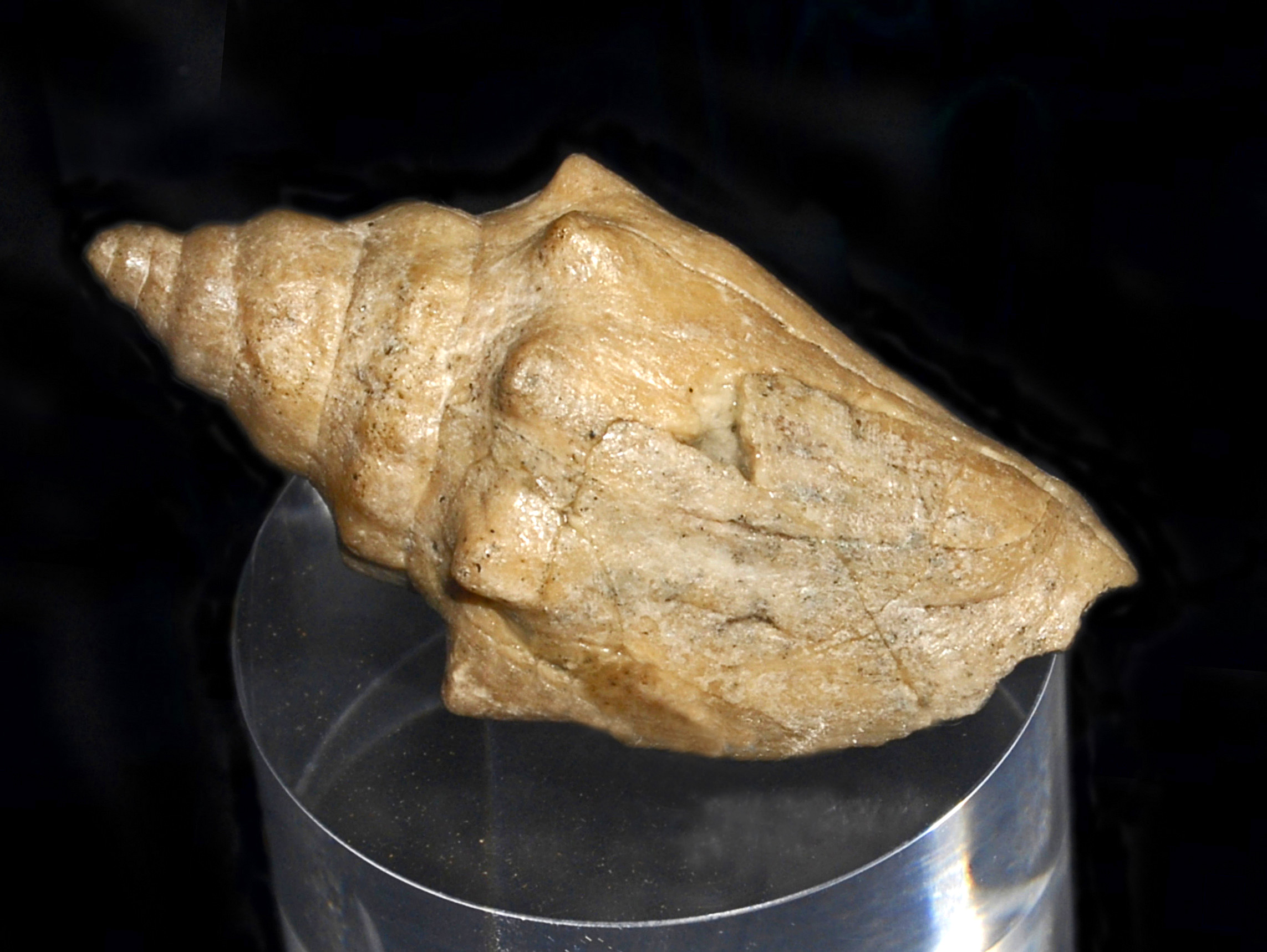
- Fossilized shell of the Oligocene-modern conch sea snail Persististrombus
  Persististrombus
  - †Persististrombus obliteratus – type locality for species
- †Petauristodon
  - †Petauristodon jamesi
  - †Petauristodon mathewsi
  - †Petauristodon minimus
  - †Petauristodon uphami
- Petricola
  - †Petricola carditoides
  - †Petricola cognata
  - †Petricola denticulata
  - †Petricola parallela
- Petrophyllia
  - †Petrophyllia clarki
  - †Petrophyllia weaveri
- †Pewelagus
  - †Pewelagus dawsonae
- Phacoides
  - †Phacoides actulineatus
  - †Phacoides sactaecrucis – tentative report
- Phalacrocorax
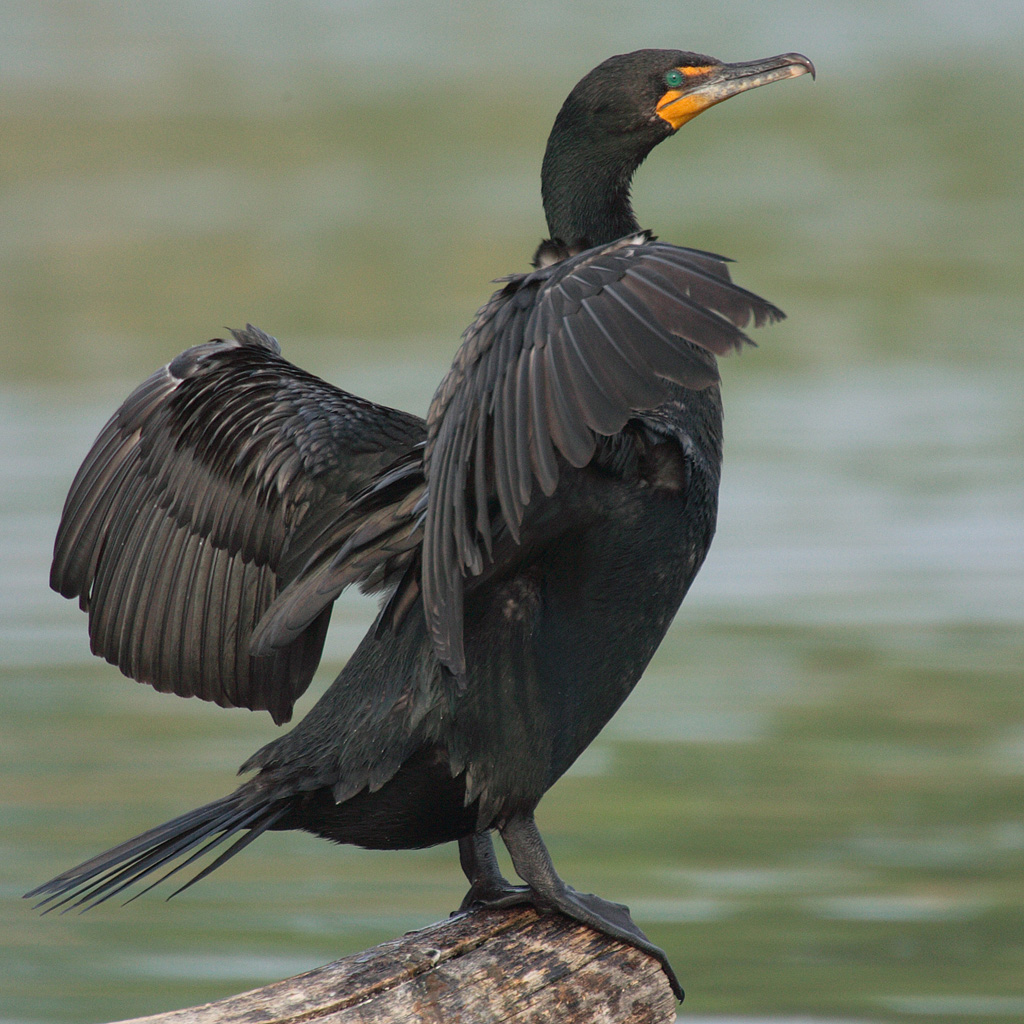
  - A living Phalacrocorax auritus, or double-crested cormorant
    †Phalacrocorax auritus
  - †Phalacrocorax femoralis – type locality for species
  - †Phalacrocorax kennelli – type locality for species
  - †Phalacrocorax pelagicus
  - †Phalacrocorax penicillatus
  - †Phalacrocorax penincillatus
  - †Phalacrocorax penincullatus
  - †Phalacrocorax rogersi – type locality for species
- Phalaropus
  - †Phalaropus fulicaria
  - †Phalaropus lobatus
- †Phanaeus
  - †Phanaeus labreae – type locality for species
- †Phelosaccomys
  - †Phelosaccomys shotwelli – type locality for species
- †Phenacolemur
  - †Phenacolemur shifrae
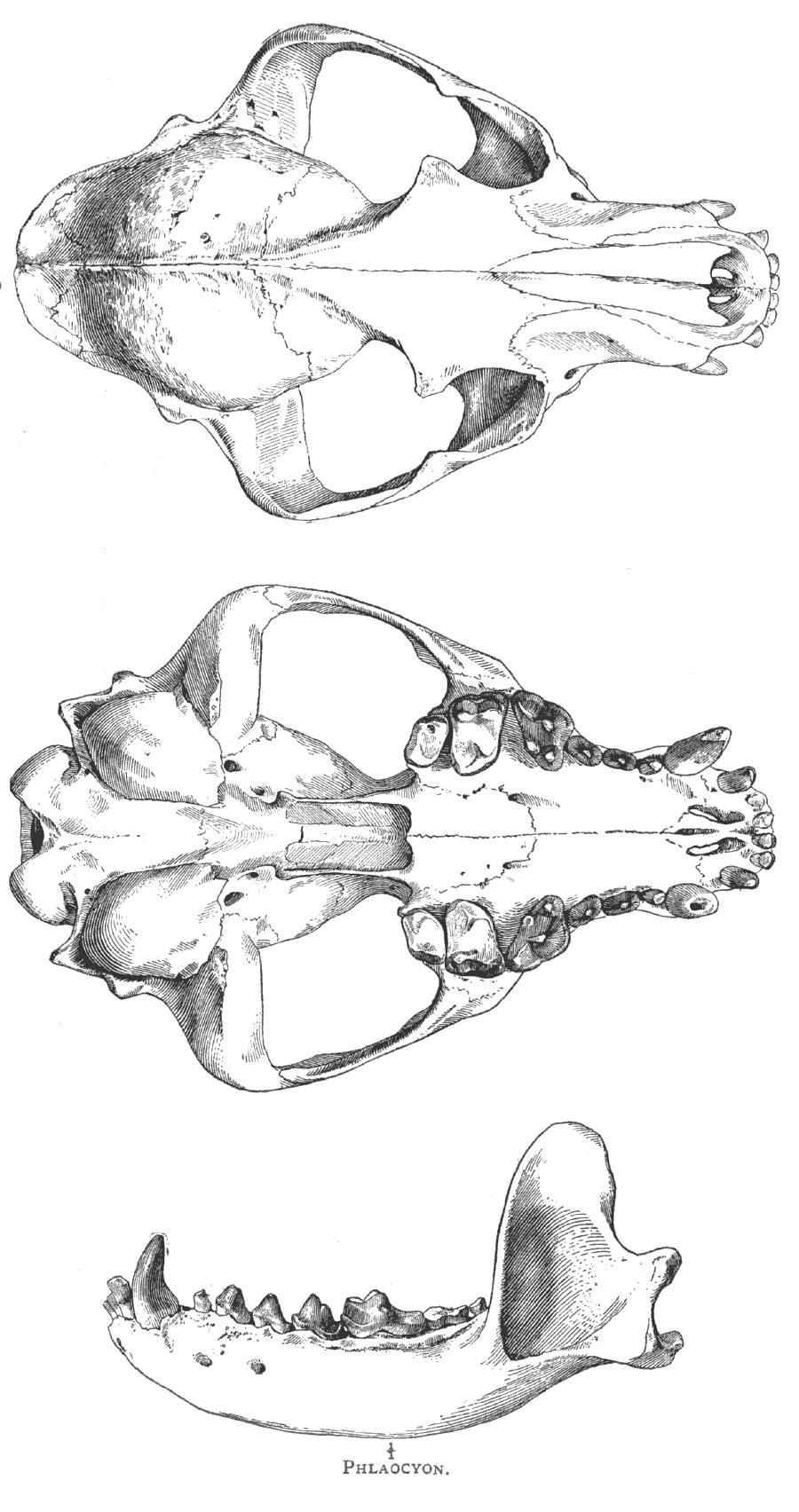
- Illustration of a fossilized skull in multiple views of the Oligocene-Miocene bone-crushing dog Phlaocyon
  †Phlaocyon
  - †Phlaocyon taylori
- †Phlepsius
  - †Phlepsius weissmanae – type locality for species
- Phloeodes
  - †Phloeodes diabolicus
  - †Phloeodes plicatus
- †Phoberogale
  - †Phoberogale shareri – type locality for species
- Phoca
  - †Phoca vitulina – or unidentified comparable form
- Phocoena – or unidentified comparable form
- †Phoebastria
  - †Phoebastria albatrus – type locality for species
  - †Phoebastria anglica – type locality for species
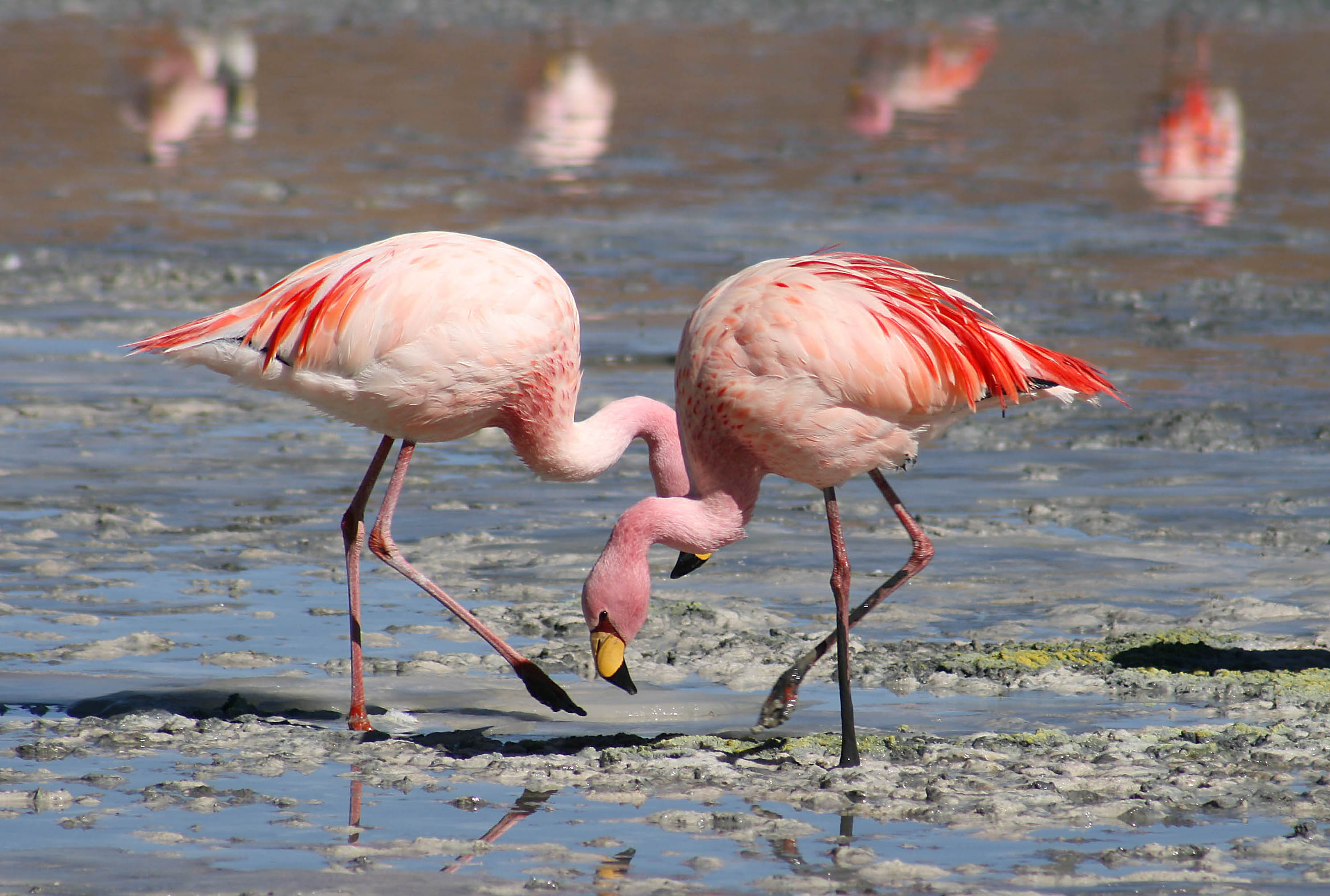
- Two Phoenicopterus, or flamingos
  Phoenicopterus – or unidentified comparable form
- Pholadidea
- Pholadomya
  - †Pholadomya mounti
  - †Pholadomya nasuta
- Pholas
  - †Pholas gabbi
- Phos
  - †Phos blakianus – or unidentified comparable form
  - †Phos dumbleanus
- †Photinia
  - †Photinia miocenica
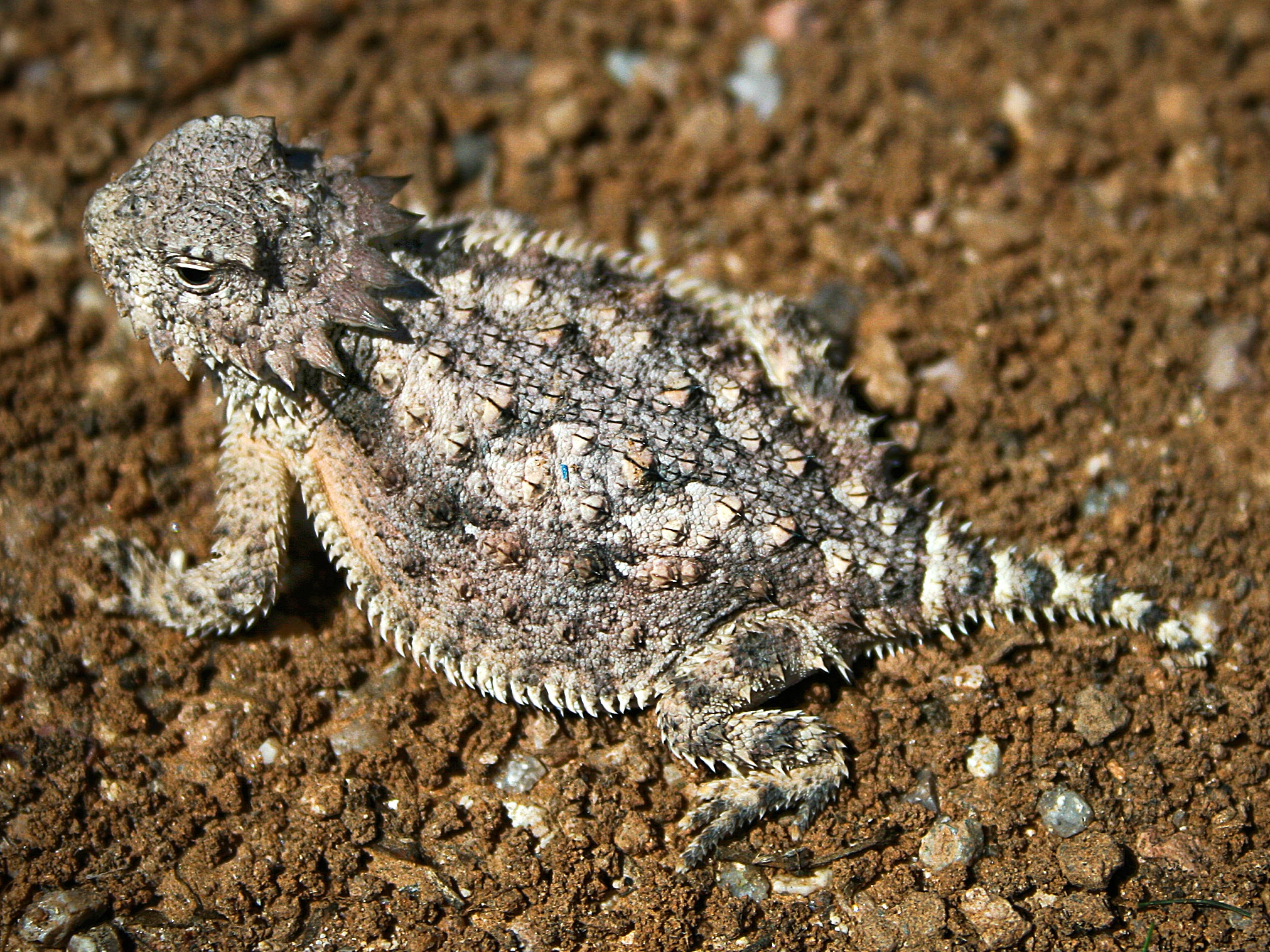
- A living Phrynosoma, or horned lizard
  Phrynosoma
- †Phyllites
  - †Phyllites californica
  - †Phyllites coalingensis
  - †Phyllites cordiaefolia – type locality for species
  - †Phyllites daturaefolia – type locality for species
  - †Phyllites domenginensis
  - †Phyllites ellipticus
  - †Phyllites laurinea
  - †Phyllites temblorensis
- Phyllonotus
  - †Phyllonotus hippocastanum
  - †Phyllonotus radix
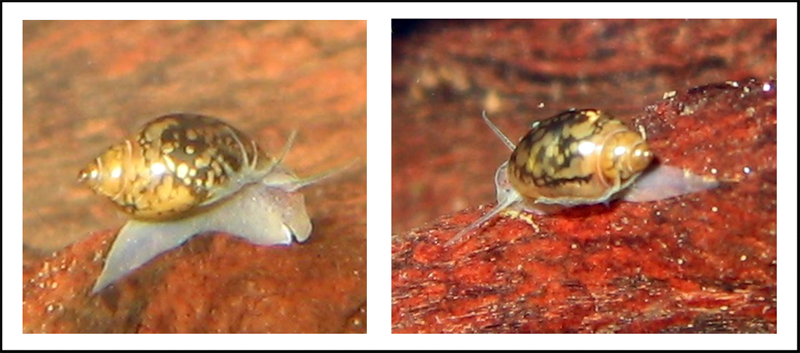
- A live individual of Physa marmorata
  Physa
- †Physiculua
- Phytocrene
  - †Phytocrene sordida
- Picea
  - †Picea lahontense
  - †Picea magna
  - †Picea sonomensis
- †Pimelometopodon
  - †Pimelometopodon pulchrum – or unidentified comparable form
- Pimelometopon
  - †Pimelometopon pulchrum
- Pinna
  - †Pinna alamedaensis
  - †Pinna latrania – type locality for species
  - †Pinna lewisi
  - †Pinna llajasensis – type locality for species
  - †Pinna mendenhalli – type locality for species
- †Pinnarctidion – type locality for genus
  - †Pinnarctidion bishopi – type locality for species
- Pinus
  - †Pinus carmelensis – type locality for species
  - †Pinus muricata
  - †Pinus prelambertiana – or unidentified comparable form
  - †Pinus radiata
  - †Pinus sturgisii
  - †Pinus temblorensis
- Piranga
  - †Piranga ludoviciana
- †Piscolithax
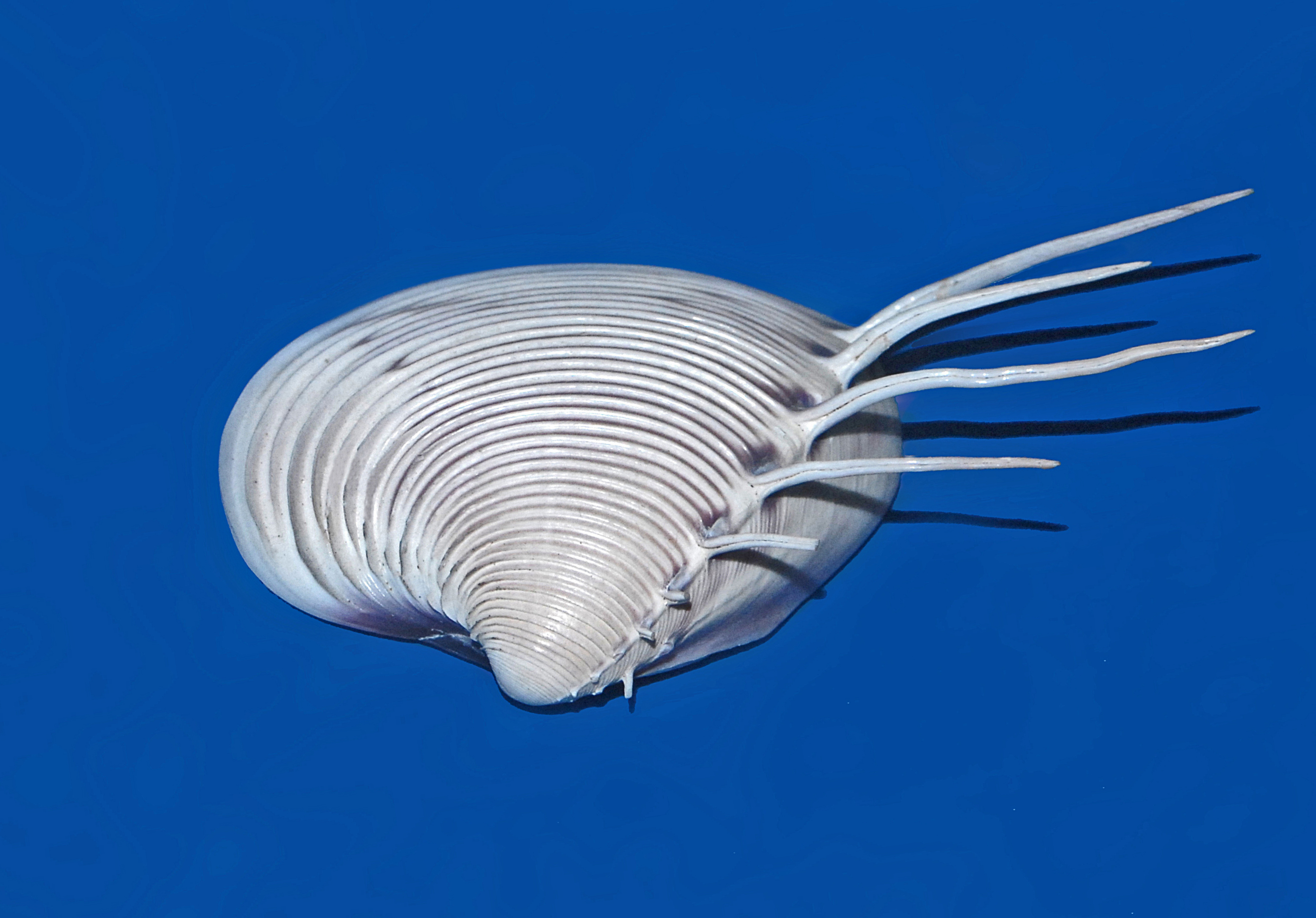
- Shell of a Pitar venus clam
  Pitar
  - †Pitar avenalensis – tentative report
  - †Pitar behri
  - †Pitar california – or unidentified comparable form
  - †Pitar californiana
  - †Pitar campi – or unidentified comparable form
  - †Pitar dalli
  - †Pitar joaquinensis
  - †Pitar newcombianus
  - †Pitar quadratus
  - †Pitar stantoni – or unidentified comparable form
  - †Pitar tejonensis – or unidentified comparable form
  - †Pitar uvasana
  - †Pitar uvasanus
- †Pithanodelphis
- †Pithanotaria – type locality for genus
  - †Pithanotaria starri – type locality for species
- Pituophis
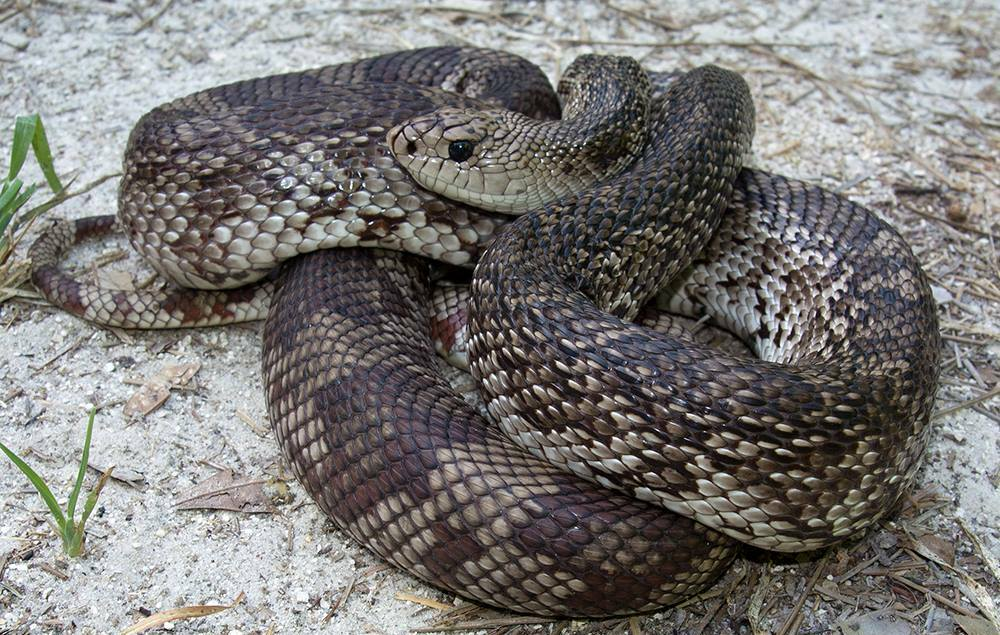
  - A living Pituophis melanoleucus, or pine snake
    †Pituophis melanoleucus
- Pitymys
  - †Pitymys mcnowni – or unidentified comparable form
- Placunanomia
  - †Placunanomia granti
- Planularia
  - †Planularia caribbeana
- †Platanophyllum
  - †Platanophyllum angustiloba
  - †Platanophyllum whitenyi
  - †Platanophyllum whitneyi
- Platanus
  - †Platanus angustilobus – type locality for species
  - †Platanus appendiculata
  - †Platanus coloradensis
  - †Platanus dissecta – or unidentified comparable form
  - †Platanus paucidentata
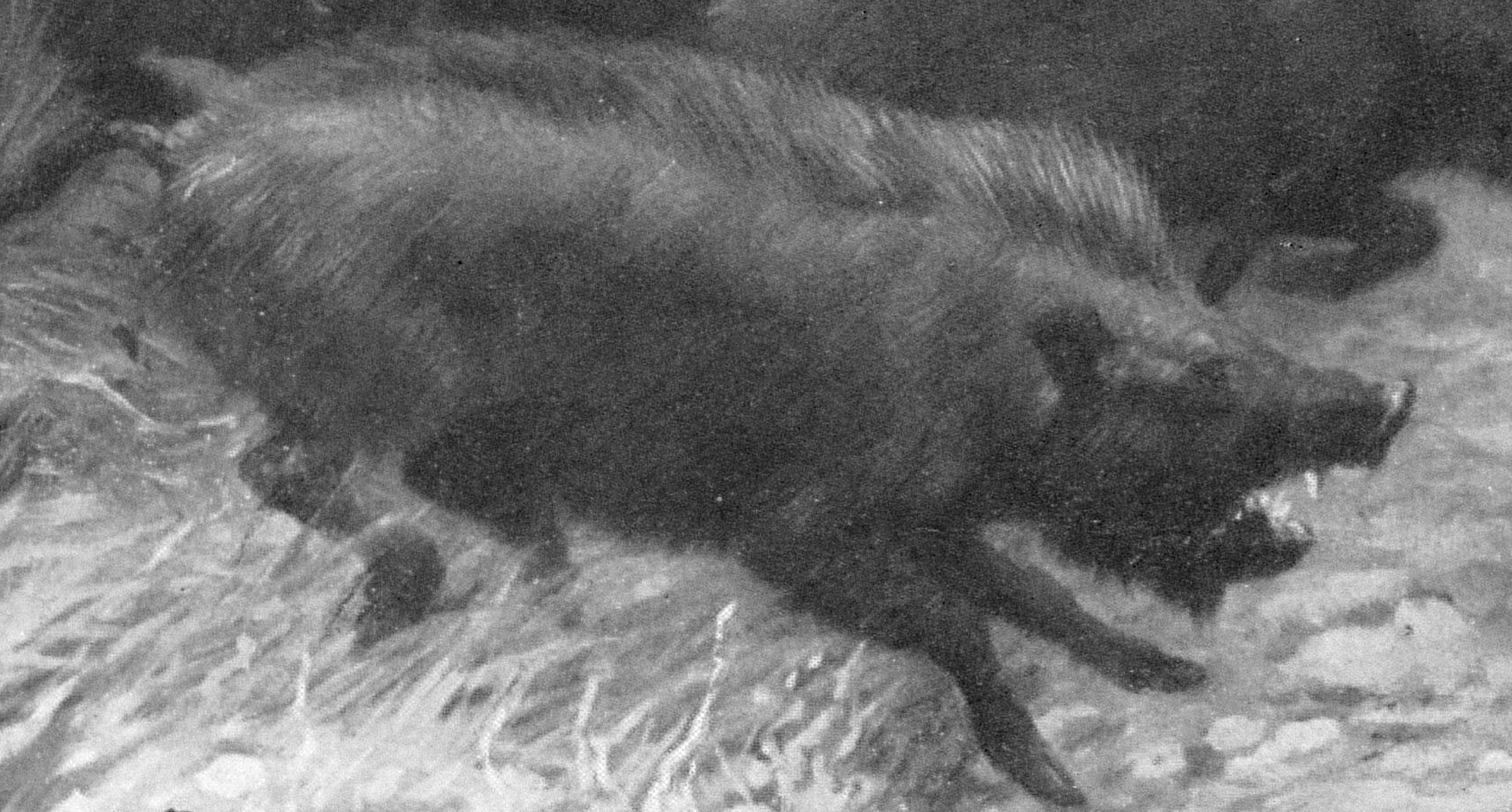
- Restoration of a herd of alarmed Miocene-Pleistocene peccaries of the genus Platygonus. Charles R. Knight (1922).
  †Platygonus
  - †Platygonus bicalcaratus
  - †Platygonus vetus
- †Platylithax – type locality for genus
  - †Platylithax robusta – type locality for species
- Platynus
  - †Platynus funebris – or unidentified comparable form
- Platyodon
  - †Platyodon cancellata
  - †Platyodon cancellatus
- †Platyoptera
  - †Platyoptera pacifica
- Platytrochus
  - †Platytrochus diabloensis – type locality for species
  - †Platytrochus merriami – type locality for species
- †Plectina
  - †Plectina garzaensis
  - †Plectina ruthenica – or unidentified comparable form
- Plectofrondicularia
  - †Plectofrondicularia kerni
  - †Plectofrondicularia miocenica
  - †Plectofrondicularia packardi
  - †Plectofrondicularia trinitatensis
  - †Plectofrondicularia vaughani
- †Plectrites
  - †Plectrites classeni
- Plegadis
  - †Plegadis chihi
- †Pleiolama
  - †Pleiolama vera
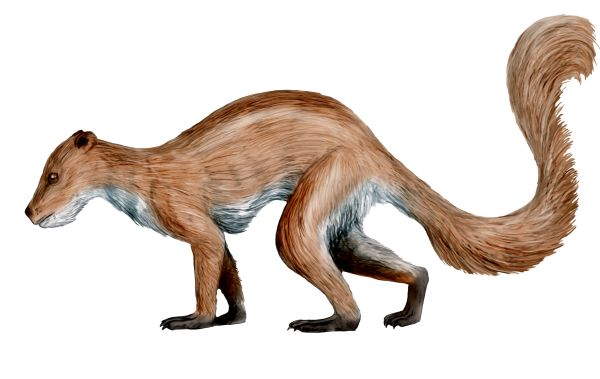
- Life restoration of the Paleocene-Eocene primate Plesiadapis
  †Plesiadapis
  - †Plesiadapis anceps – or unidentified comparable form
  - †Plesiadapis churchilli – or unidentified comparable form
- †Plesiogulo
  - †Plesiogulo lindsayi
  - †Plesiogulo marshalli
- Pleurofusia
  - †Pleurofusia fresnoensis
  - †Pleurofusia lindavistaensis – or unidentified related form
- †Pleuroncodes
- †Pleuronichthys
  - †Pleuronichthys veliger
- †Pliauchenia
  - †Pliauchenia magnifontis – or unidentified comparable form
- †Plioceros
- †Pliocyon
  - †Pliocyon medius
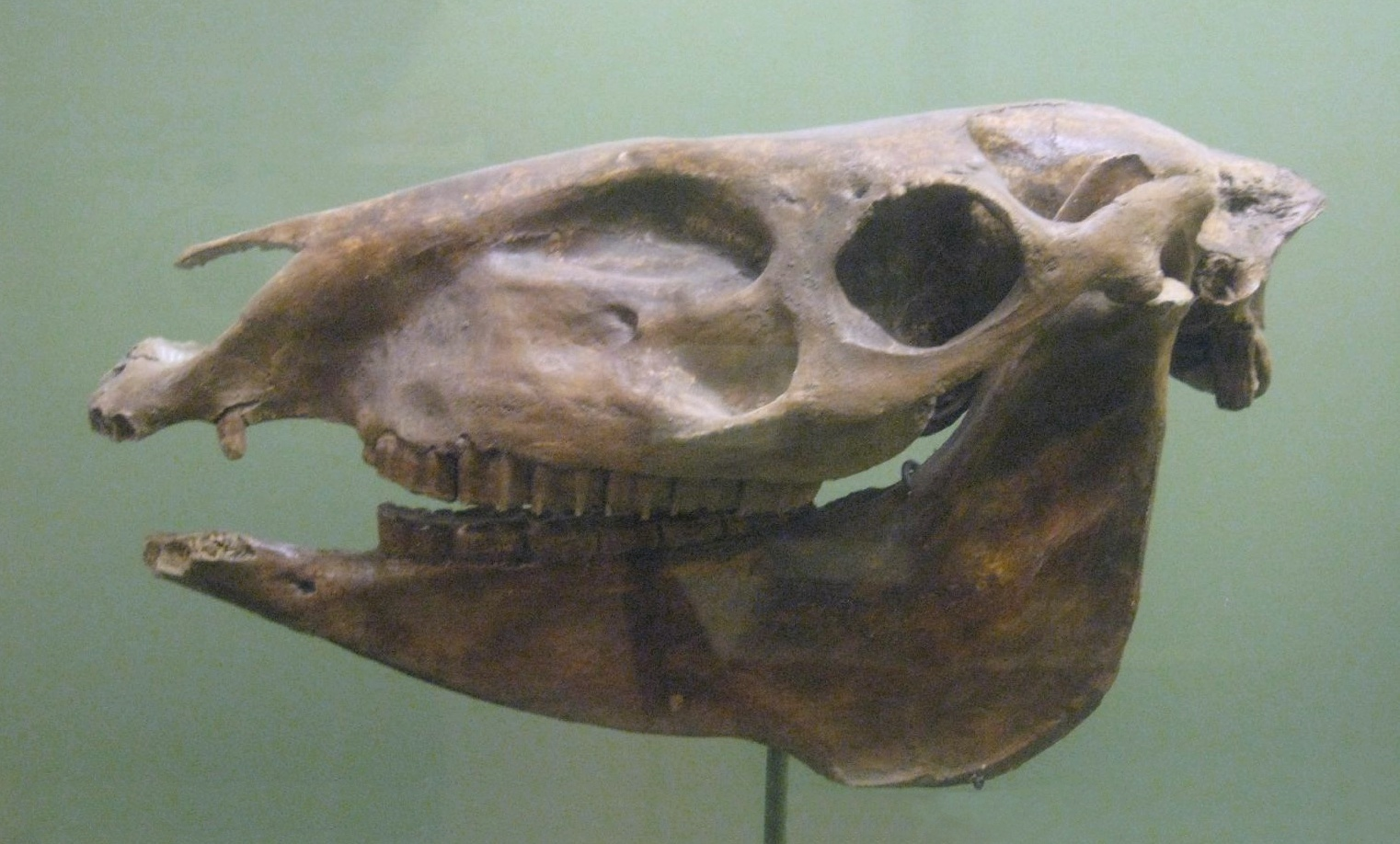
- Fossilized skull of the Miocene horse Pliohippus
  †Pliohippus
  - †Pliohippus coalingensis – type locality for species
  - †Pliohippus fairbanksi – type locality for species
  - †Pliohippus spectans – tentative report
- †Pliometanastes
  - †Pliometanastes protistus
- †Plionarctos
  - †Plionarctos edensis – type locality for species
- †Plionictis
  - †Plionictis ogygia – or unidentified comparable form
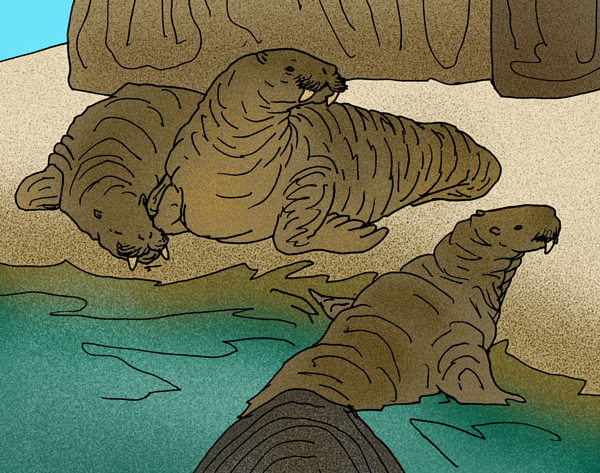
- Life restoration of the Miocene walrus Pliopedia
  †Pliopedia – type locality for genus
  - †Pliopedia pacifica – type locality for species
- †Pliotaxidea
  - †Pliotaxidea garberi – type locality for species
- †Pliotomodon
  - †Pliotomodon primitivus – type locality for species
- †Plithocyon
  - †Plithocyon barstowensis
- †Plotopterum – type locality for genus
  - †Plotopterum joaquinensis – type locality for species
- Pluvialis
  - †Pluvialis squatarola
- Pneumatophorus
  - †Pneumatophorus grex – or unidentified comparable form
- †Poabromylus – tentative report
  - †Poabromylus robustus
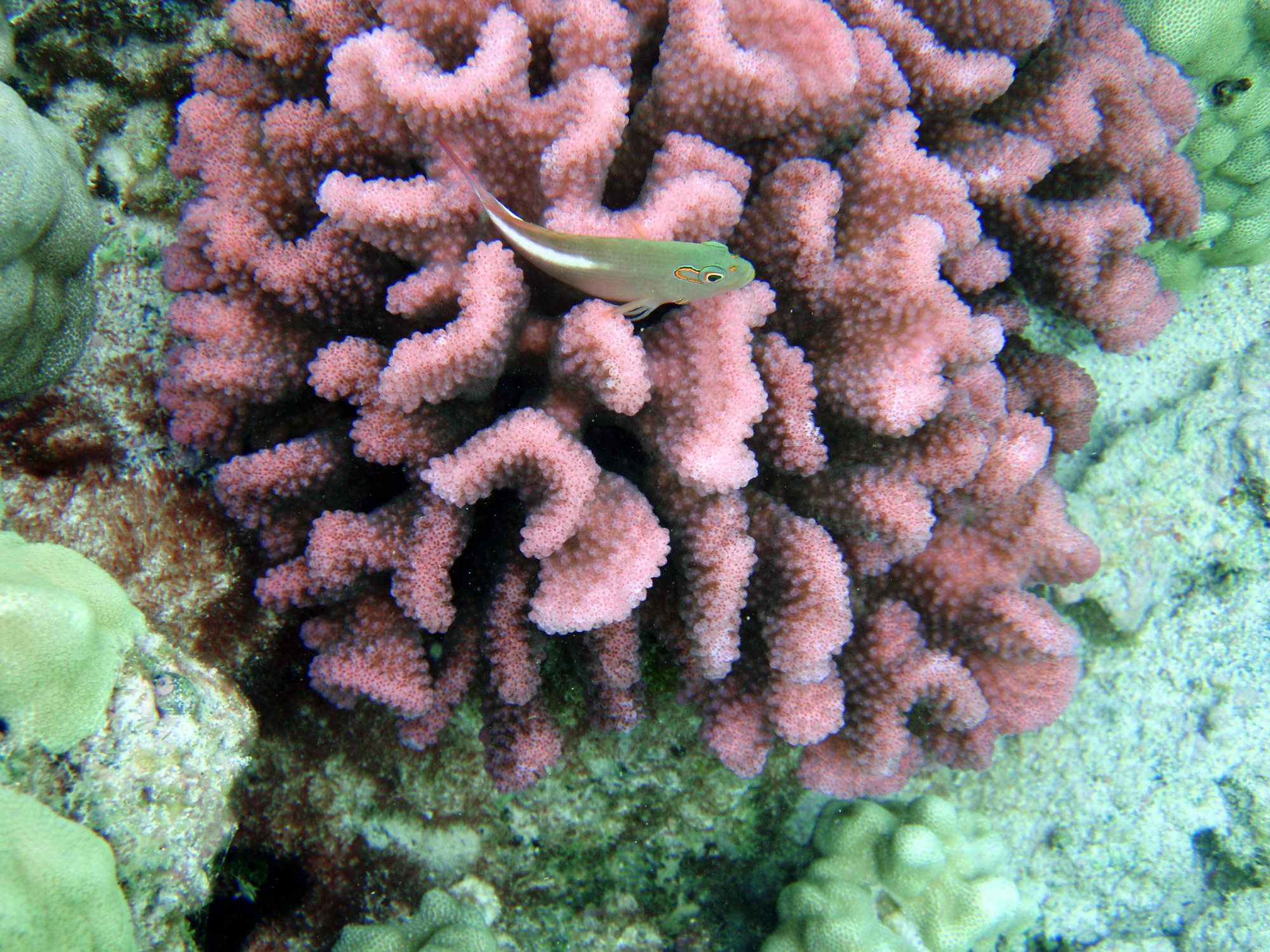
- Living Pocillopora, or cauliflower coral
  Pocillopora
- Podiceps
  - †Podiceps arndti
  - †Podiceps auritus
  - †Podiceps discors
  - †Podiceps nigricolis
  - †Podiceps parvus
  - †Podiceps subparvus
- Podilymbus
  - †Podilymbus podiceps
- Pododesmus
  - †Pododesmus macrochisma
- †Poebrodon
  - †Poebrodon californicus – type locality for species
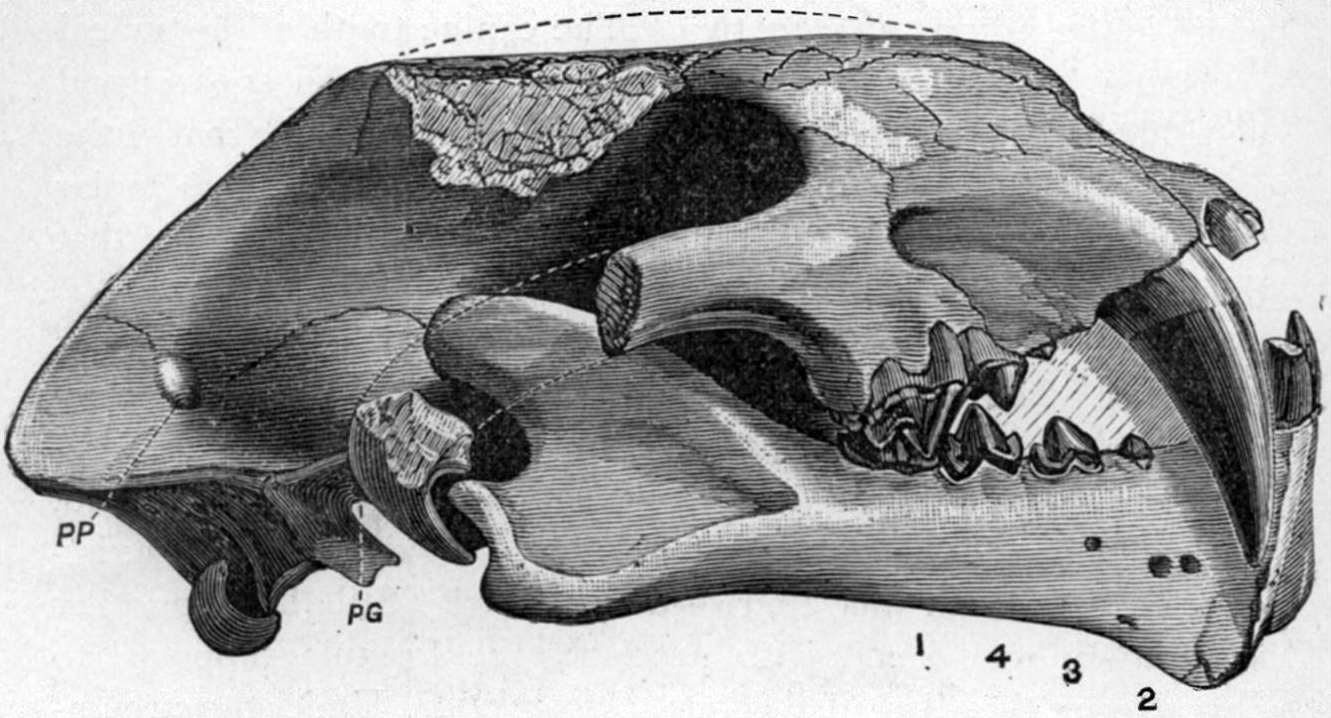
- Illustration of a fossilized skull of the Oligocene false faber-toothed cat Pogonodon
  †Pogonodon
  - †Pogonodon brachyops
- Polinices
  - †Polinices – type locality for species informal
  - †Polinices draconis
  - †Polinices horni – or unidentified comparable form
  - †Polinices hornii
  - †Polinices lewisii
  - †Polinices pinyonensis – or unidentified comparable form
  - †Polinices recluzianys
  - †Polinices rectus – or unidentified related form
  - †Polinices susanaensis
  - †Polinices uber
  - †Polinices washingtonensis – or unidentified comparable form
- Polydora
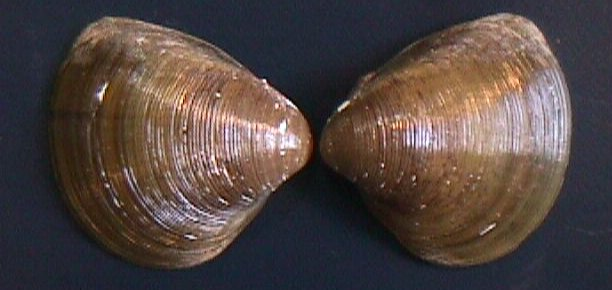
- Exterior of the shell of a Polymesoda basket clam
  Polymesoda
  - †Polymesoda tenuis – or unidentified comparable form
- Polystira
  - †Polystira barretti
- †Pongamia
  - †Pongamia ovata – type locality for species
- †Pontolis – or unidentified comparable form
  - †Pontolis magnus
- Populus
  - †Populus alexanderii
  - †Populus bonhamii
  - †Populus coalingensis
  - †Populus garberii
- Porichthys
  - †Porichthys myriaster
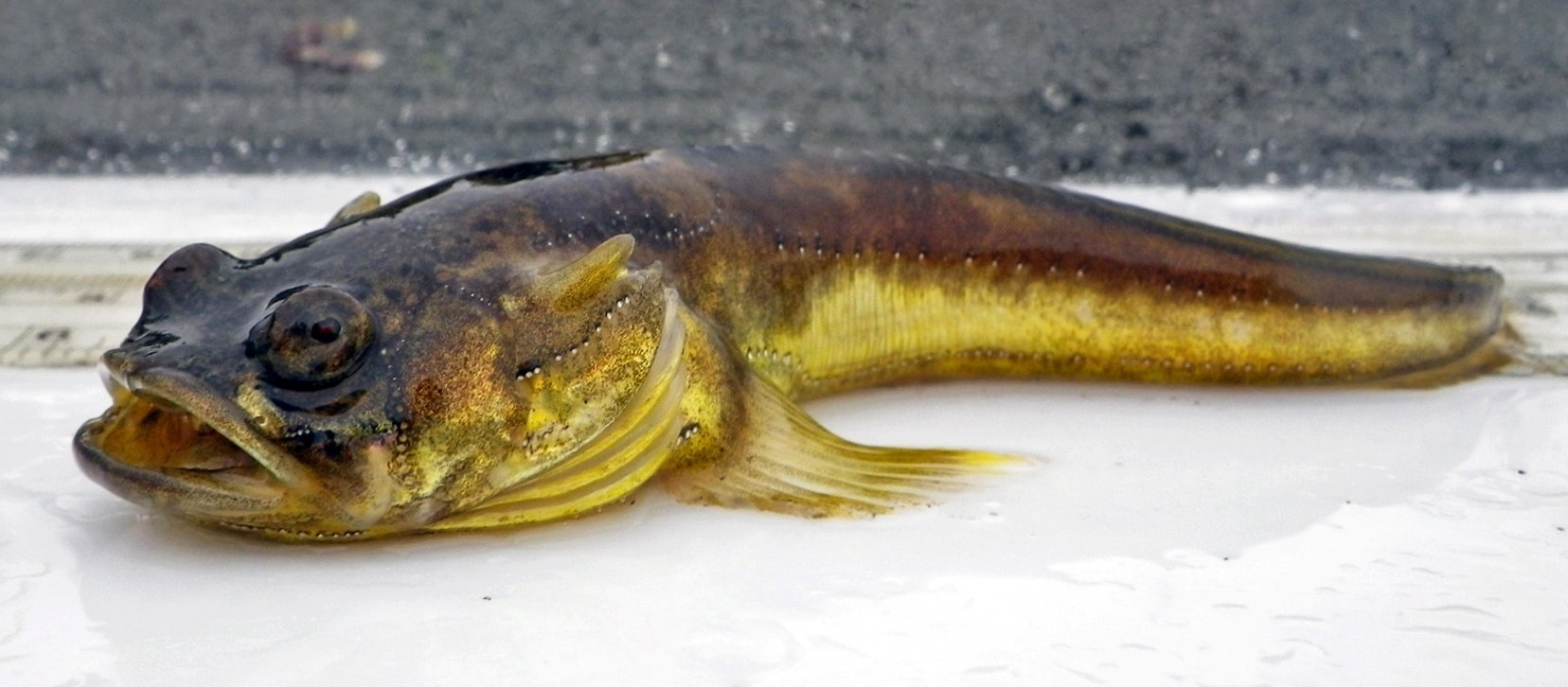
  - A modern Porichthys notatus, or plainfin midshipman
    †Porichthys notatus
- Porites
  - †Porites carrizensis – type locality for species
- †Portunites
  - †Portunites insculpta
- †Potamides
  - †Potamides carbonica – or unidentified comparable form
  - †Potamides sespeensis
- †Praemancalla – type locality for genus
  - †Praemancalla lagunensis – type locality for species
- †Presbychen – type locality for genus
  - †Presbychen abavus – type locality for species
- †Presbymys
  - †Presbymys lophatus – type locality for species
- Priene
  - †Priene amoldi
  - †Priene oregonensis
  - †Priene scotiaensis
- Prionace

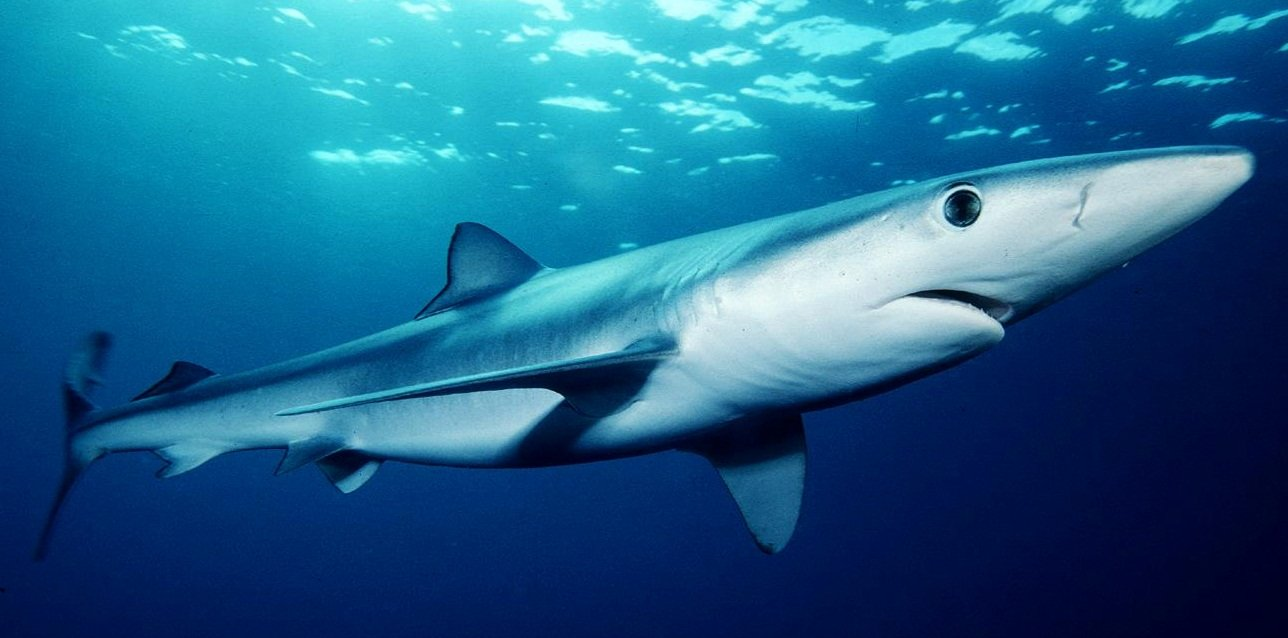
A living Prionace glauca, or blue shark

  - Prionace glauca Linnaeus, 1849
  - †Prionace clarki Mount, 1969
- †Priscoficus
  - †Priscoficus caudata
- †Priscofusus
  - †Priscofusus carlsoni – tentative report
  - †Priscofusus hecoxi
  - †Priscofusus lincolnensis
  - †Priscofusus robustus
- †Pristichampsus
- Pristiophorus
- †Pristophorus
- †Proboscipeda
- †Procamelus
  - †Procamelus grandis – or unidentified comparable form
- †Procymophyes – type locality for genus
  - †Procymophyes lithax – type locality for species
- †Procynodictis
  - †Procynodictis progressus
- Procyon
  - †Procyon lotor
  - †Procyon psora
- †Prodipodomys
  - †Prodipodomys idahoensis
  - †Prodipodomys riversidensis – type locality for species
  - †Prodipodomys timoteoensis – type locality for species
- †Prodipoides
  - †Prodipoides lecontei – type locality for species
- Progabbia
- †Proharrymys – or unidentified comparable form
- †Proheteromys
  - †Proheteromys maximus
  - †Proheteromys sulculus
- †Promartes
- †Pronotolagus
  - †Pronotolagus apachensis – or unidentified comparable form
- †Protadjidaumo
- †Protanthias – type locality for genus
  - †Protanthias fossilis – type locality for species
- †Protepicyon
  - †Protepicyon raki – type locality for species
- †Proterixoides
  - †Proterixoides davisi – type locality for species
- †Prothomomys
  - †Prothomomys warrenensis – type locality for species
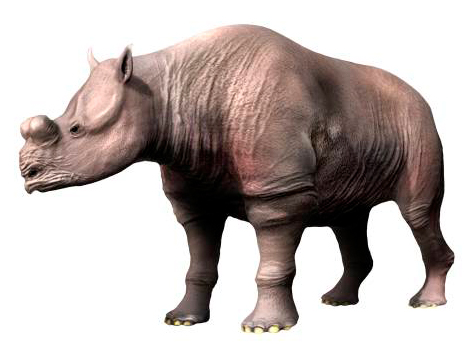
- Life restoration of the Eocene brontothere mammal Protitanops
  †Protitanops
  - †Protitanops curryi – type locality for species
- †Protoarrenurus
  - †Protoarrenurus convergens – type locality for species
- †Protochlorotettix – type locality for genus
  - †Protochlorotettix calico – type locality for species
- †Protohepialus – type locality for genus
  - †Protohepialus comstocki – type locality for species
- †Protolabis
  - †Protolabis barstowensis – type locality for species
- †Protomarctus
  - †Protomarctus optatus
- †Protoreodon
  - †Protoreodon pacificus – type locality for species
  - †Protoreodon parvus – or unidentified comparable form
  - †Protoreodon pumilus
  - †Protoreodon transmontanus
  - †Protoreodon walshi
- †Protosciurus
  - †Protosciurus tecuyensis
- †Protosegestes – report made of unidentified related form or using admittedly obsolete nomenclature
  - †Protosegestes lloydi – type locality for species
- †Protospermophilus
  - †Protospermophilus quatalensis – type locality for species
- †Protostrix
  - †Protostrix californiensis – type locality for species
- †Protosurcula – tentative report
- Protothaca
  - †Protothaca staleyi
- †Protothore – type locality for genus
  - †Protothore explicata – type locality for species
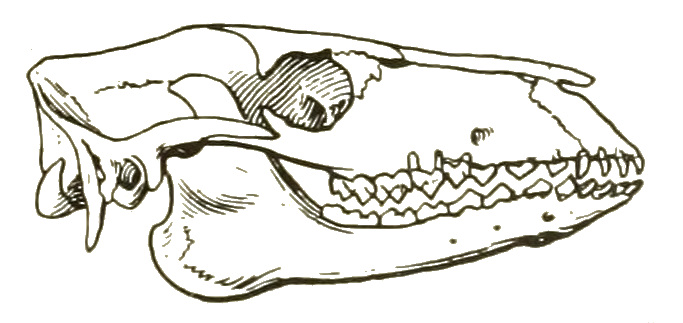
- Illustration of a fossilized skull of the Eocene camel Protylopus
  †Protylopus
  - †Protylopus pearsonensis – type locality for species
  - †Protylopus petersoni – or unidentified comparable form
  - †Protylopus robustus – type locality for species
  - †Protylopus stocki – type locality for species
- Proximitra – tentative report
  - †Proximitra cretacea
- Prunus
  - †Prunus turlockensis
- Psammacoma
  - †Psammacoma acolasta
  - †Psammacoma arctata
  - †Psammacoma yoldiformis
- Psammotreta
  - †Psammotreta dombei
  - †Psammotreta obesa
  - †Psammotreta rostellata
  - †Psammotreta viridotincta
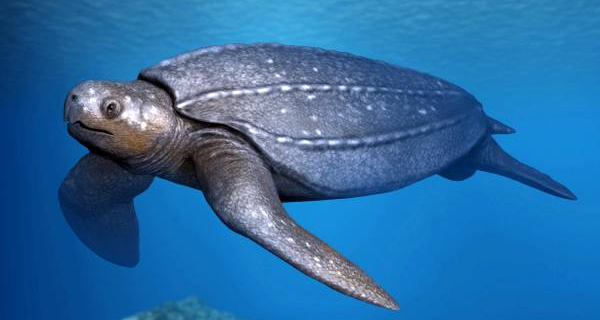
- Hypothetical restoration of the Oligocene-Pliocene sea turtle Psephophorus
  †Psephophorus
  - †Psephophorus calvertensis – or unidentified comparable form
- †Pseudaelurus
  - †Pseudaelurus intrepidus
  - †Pseudaelurus marshi
- †Pseudoblastomeryx
  - †Pseudoblastomeryx advena
- Pseudochama
  - †Pseudochama exogyra
- †Pseudoglandulina
  - †Pseudoglandulina conica
  - †Pseudoglandulina ovata
  - †Pseudoglandulina turbinata
- Pseudoliva
  - †Pseudoliva dilleri
  - †Pseudoliva inornata – or unidentified comparable form
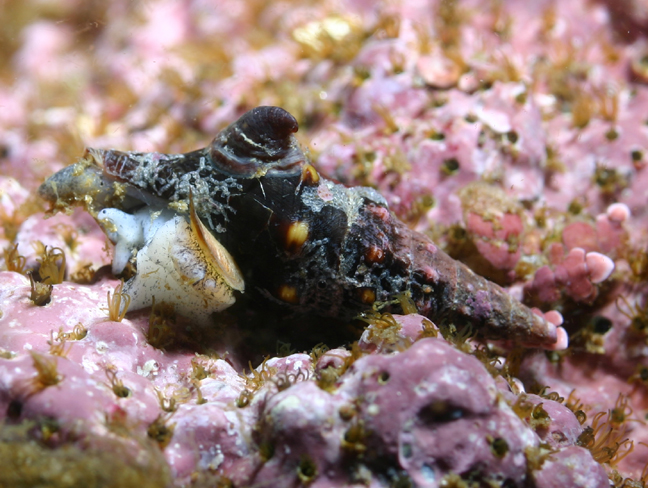
- A living Pseudomelatoma sea snail
  Pseudomelatoma
  - †Pseudomelatoma penicillata
- †Pseudoparablastomeryx
  - †Pseudoparablastomeryx scotti – or unidentified comparable form
- †Pseudoparella
- †Pseudoperrisolax
  - †Pseudoperrisolax blakei
- †Pseudoseriola – type locality for genus
  - †Pseudoseriola gillilandi – type locality for species
- †Pseudotheridomys
  - †Pseudotheridomys cuyamensis – type locality for species
- †Pseudotomus
  - †Pseudotomus californicus
  - †Pseudotomus littoralis – type locality for species
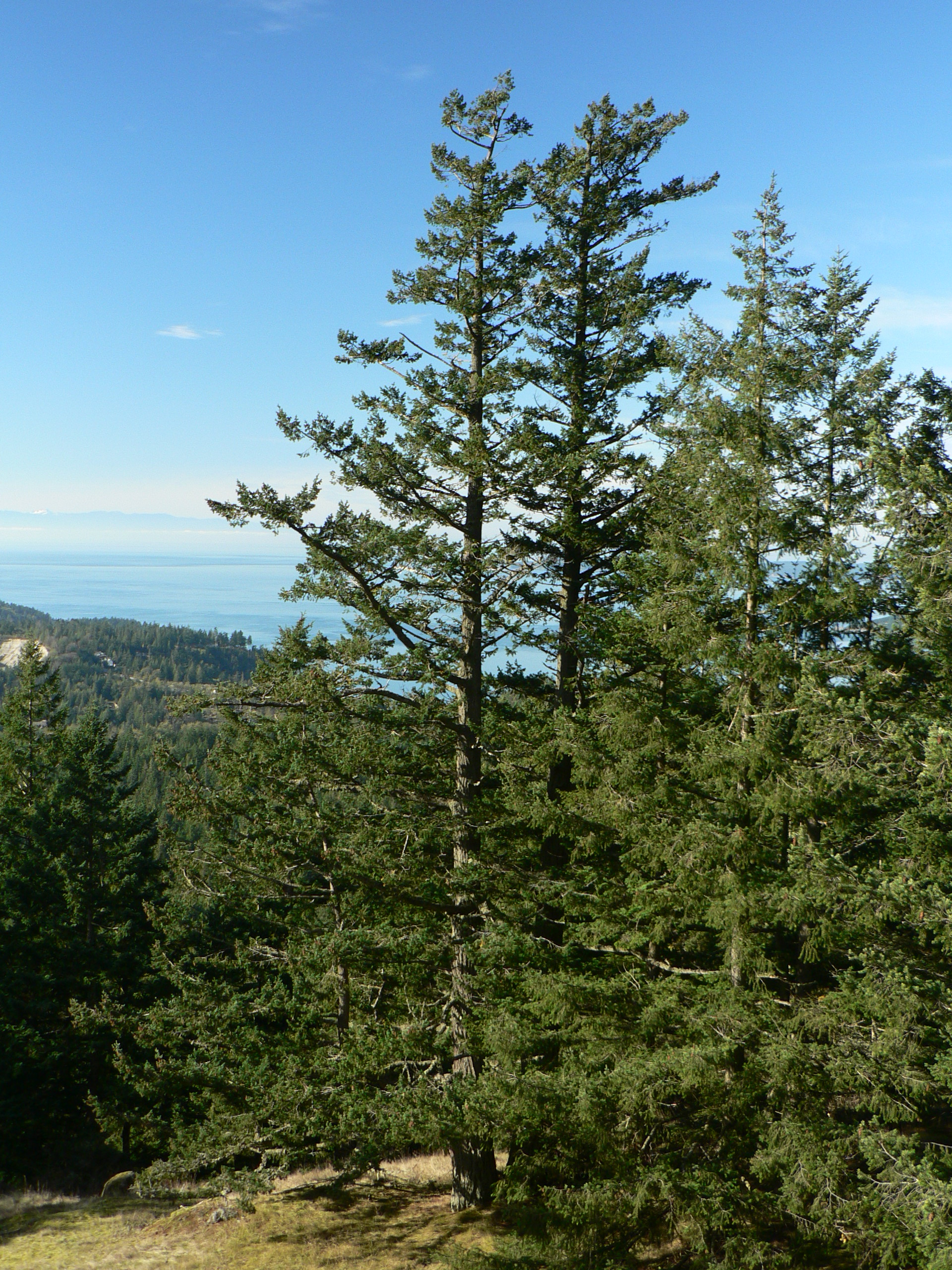
- Living Pseudotsuga, or Douglas firs
  †Pseudotsuga
  - †Pseudotsuga sonomensis
- Pteria
  - †Pteria berryi
  - †Pteria hertleini
  - †Pteria pellucida
- †Pteroplatea
  - †Pteroplatea lapislutosa – type locality for species
- Pteropurpura
  - †Pteropurpura festiva
  - †Pteropurpura trialatus
- Pterostichus
- Pterynotus
  - †Pterynotus petri
  - †Pterynotus washingtonicus
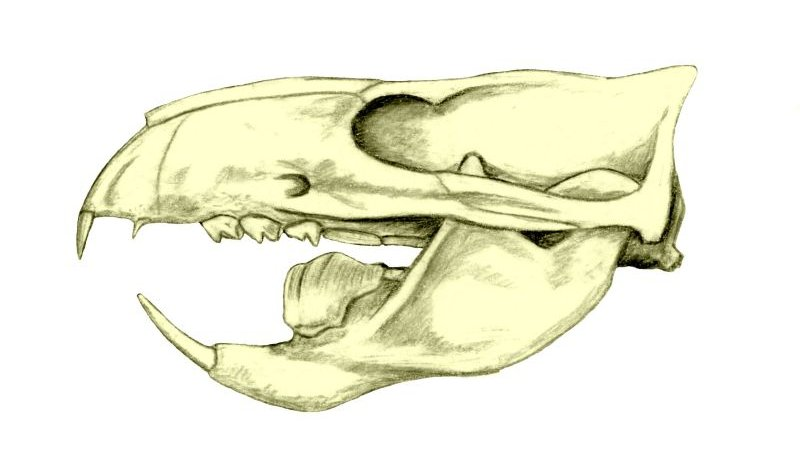
- Illustration of a fossilized skull of the Paleocene multituberculate mammal Ptilodus
  †Ptilodus
- Ptinus
  - †Ptinus priminidi – type locality for species
- Ptychoramphus
  - †Ptychoramphus aleuticus
- Puffinus
  - †Puffinus barnesi – type locality for species
  - †Puffinus calhouni – type locality for species
  - †Puffinus diatomicus – type locality for species
  - †Puffinus felthami – type locality for species
  - †Puffinus gilmorei – type locality for species
  - †Puffinus gresus
  - †Puffinus grisesus
  - †Puffinus griseus
  - †Puffinus inceptor – type locality for species
  - †Puffinus kanakoffi
  - †Puffinus mitchelli – type locality for species
  - †Puffinus opisthomelas
  - †Puffinus priscus – type locality for species
  - †Puffinus tenuirostris
- Pullenia
  - †Pullenia eocenica
  - †Pullenia quinqueloba
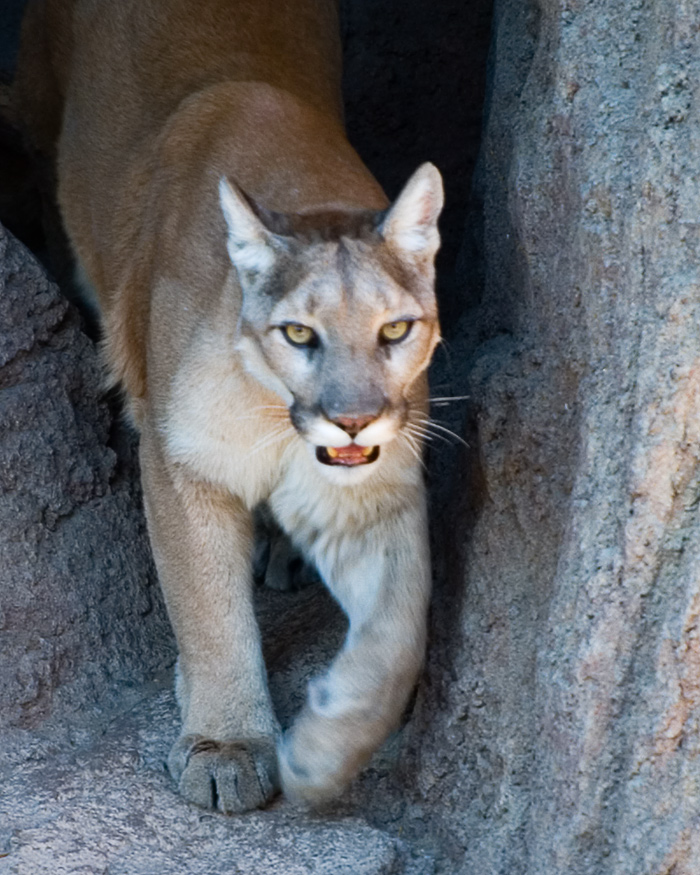
- A living Puma
  †Puma
  - †Puma concolor – type locality for species
- Puncturella
  - †Puncturella galeata
  - †Puncturella multistriata
- Pupillaria
  - †Pupillaria optabilis
  - †Pupillaria pupilla
- Purpura
  - †Purpura barbarensis
  - †Purpura festiva
  - †Purpura lima
  - †Purpura lurida
  - †Purpura milicentana – type locality for species
  - †Purpura nuttallii
  - †Purpura poulsoni
  - †Purpura topangensis
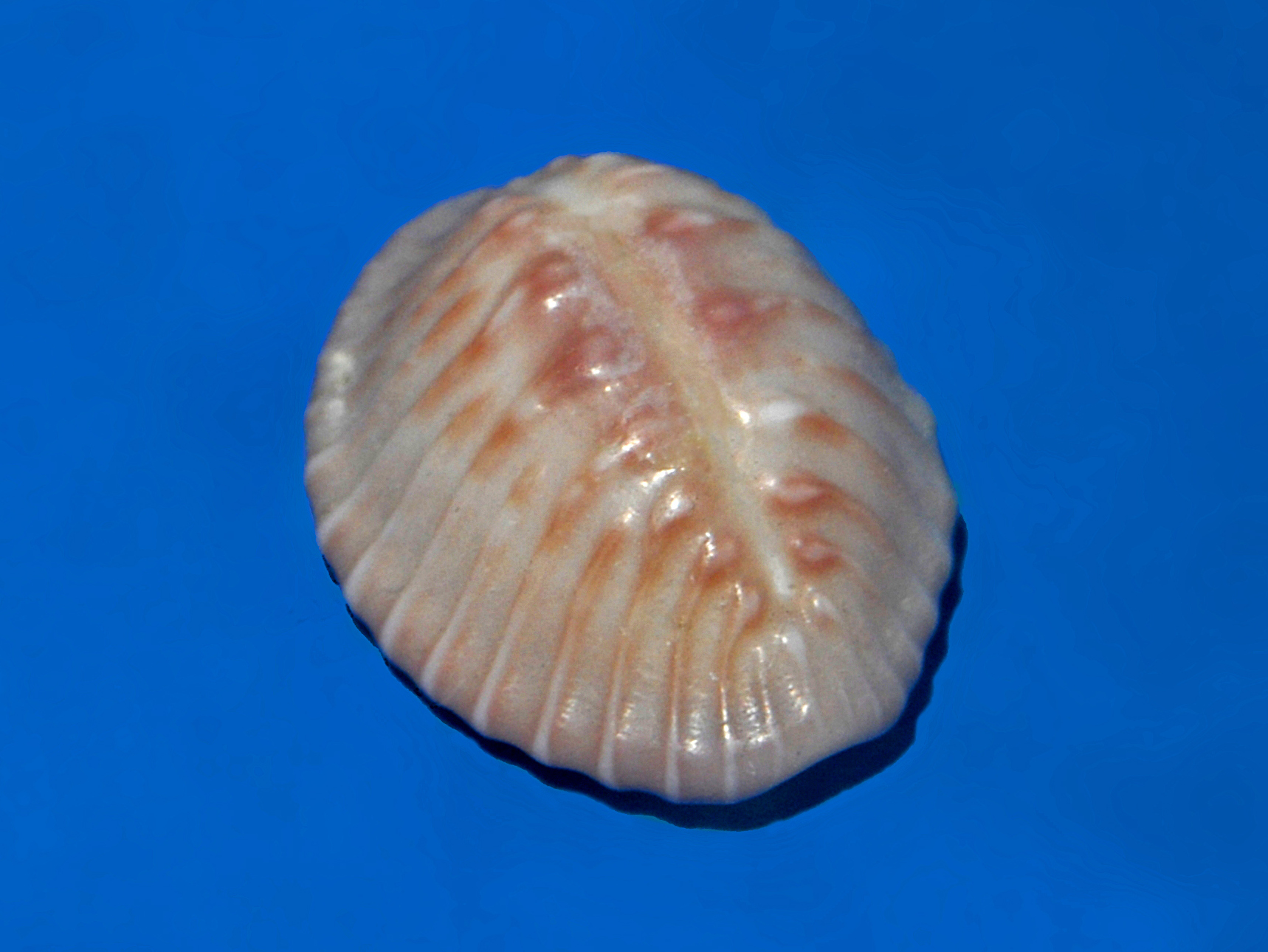
- Shell of a Pusula false cowrie sea snail
  Pusula
  - †Pusula californiana
  - †Pusula solandri
- Pycnodonte
  - †Pycnodonte eldridgei
  - †Pycnodonte heermanni
  - †Pycnodonte pacifica – or unidentified comparable form
  - †Pycnodonte stewarti – or unidentified related form
- Pyramidella
  - †Pyramidella adamsi – or unidentified comparable form
  - †Pyramidella mucronis
  - †Pyramidella preblei
- Pyrene
  - †Pyrene carinata

== Q ==
- †Quercophyllum
  - †Quercophyllum platanoides – type locality for species
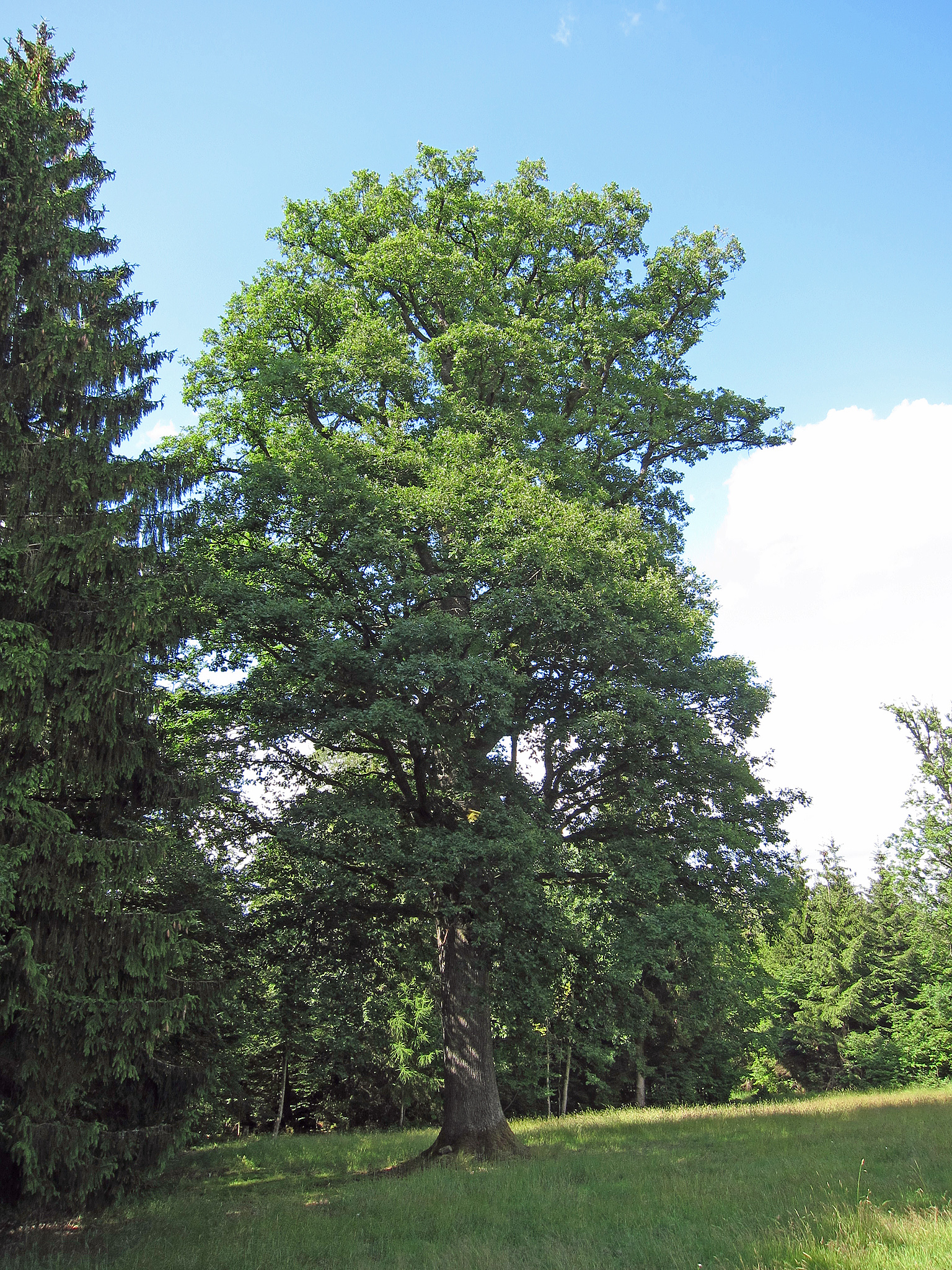
- A living Quercus, or oak tree
  Quercus
  - †Quercus acorns
  - †Quercus coalingensis
  - †Quercus dispersa
  - †Quercus distincta
  - †Quercus domenginensis
  - †Quercus douglasoides
  - †Quercus eoxalapensis – type locality for species
  - †Quercus hannibali
  - †Quercus hannibalii
  - †Quercus lakevillensis
  - †Quercus merriami
  - †Quercus nevadensis
  - †Quercus pasadorii – type locality for species
  - †Quercus pliopalmerii
  - †Quercus pollardiana
  - †Quercus pseudolyrata
  - †Quercus remingtonii
  - †Quercus sayana
  - †Quercus simulata
  - †Quercus temblorensis
  - †Quercus wislizenoides

== R ==
- Raja
- †Rakomeryx
  - †Rakomeryx sinclairi – type locality for species
- Rallus
  - †Rallus limicola
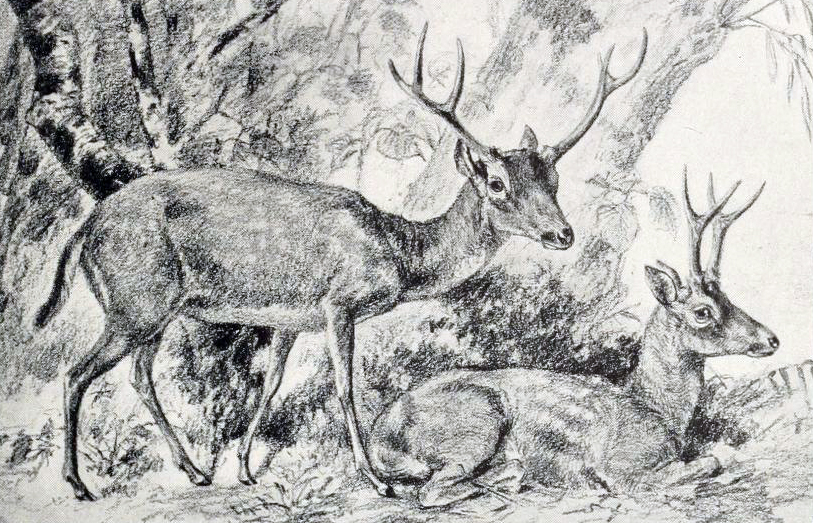
- Life restoration of the Miocene-Pliocene pronghorn Ramoceros and Cosoryx. Robert Bruce Horsfall (1913).
  †Ramoceros
  - †Ramoceros brevicornis – type locality for species
- †Rana
- †Ranellina
  - †Ranellina pilsbry – or unidentified related form
- Raninoides
  - †Raninoides slaki – type locality for species
- †Rapamys
  - †Rapamys fricki – type locality for species
- Rapana
  - †Rapana vaquerosensis
- †Rectoguembelina
  - †Rectoguembelina trinitatensis – or unidentified comparable form
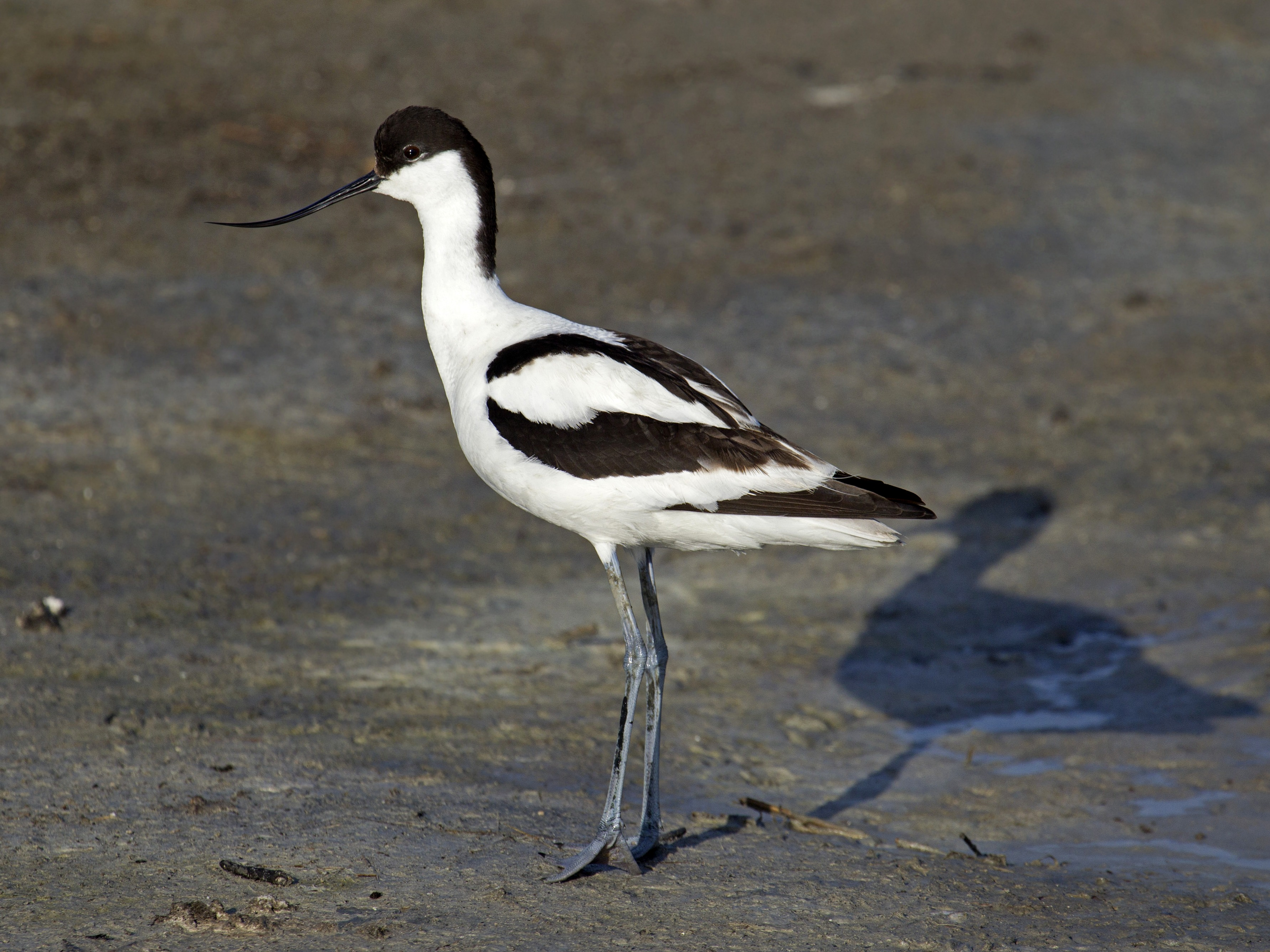
- A living Recurvirostra, or avocet
  Recurvirostra
- Reithrodontomys
- †Reithroparamys – or unidentified comparable form
- Reophax
  - †Reophax pilulifer – or unidentified comparable form
- †Repomys
  - †Repomys gustelyi – type locality for species
  - †Repomys maxumi – type locality for species
- Reticulitermes
  - †Reticulitermes laurae – type locality for species
  - †Reticulitermes tibalis
- Reticutriton
  - †Reticutriton elsmerensis
- †Retipirula
  - †Retipirula crassitesta
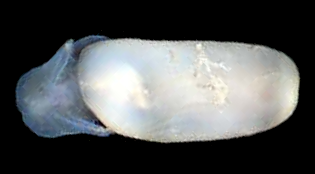
- A living Retusa barrel bubble sea snail
  Retusa
  - †Retusa carinata
  - †Retusa culcitella
  - †Retusa harpa
  - †Retusa tantilla
- †Reynoldsomys
  - †Reynoldsomys timoteoensis – type locality for species
- †Rhabdammina
  - †Rhabdammina eocenica
- †Rhamnidium
  - †Rhamnidium chaneyi
- †Rhamnus
  - †Rhamnus calyptus
  - †Rhamnus moragensis
  - †Rhamnus plenus
  - †Rhamnus precalifornica
- †Rhomarchus – type locality for genus
  - †Rhomarchus ensiger – type locality for species
- †Rhomurus
  - †Rhomurus fulcratus
- Rhus
  - †Rhus diablana
  - †Rhus mixta
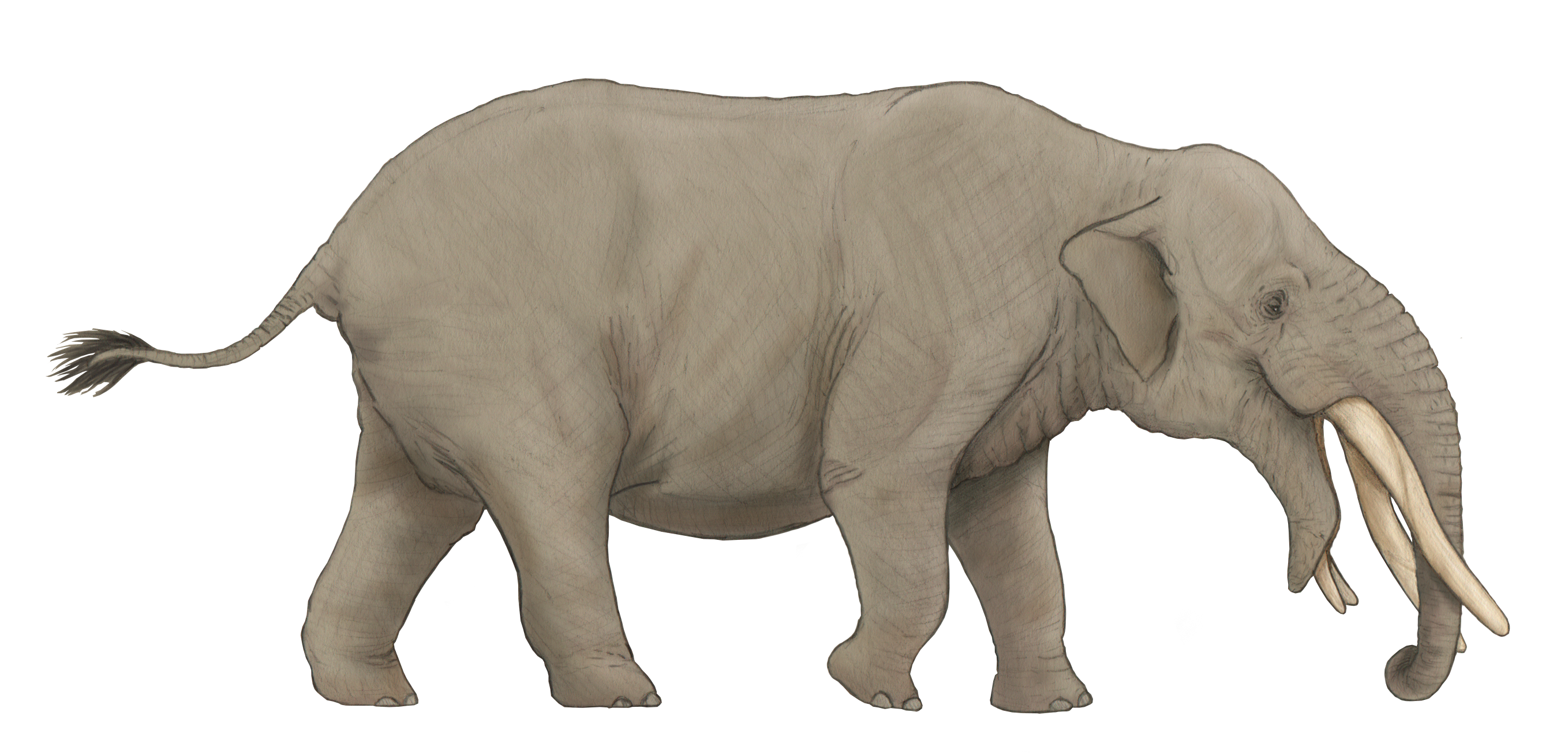
- Restoration of the Miocene-Pliocene elephant relative Rhynchotherium
  †Rhynchotherium
  - †Rhynchotherium falconeri
- †Rhynconella – tentative report
- †Rhyssomatus
  - †Rhyssomatus miocenae – type locality for species
- †Rhythmias
  - †Rhythmias gaviotae – type locality for species
  - †Rhythmias slarri
- Rimella
  - †Rimella macilentus
  - †Rimella supraplicata
  - †Rimella supraplicatus
- Rissa
  - †Rissa estesi – type locality for species
  - †Rissa tridactyla
- Rissoina
  - †Rissoina pleistocena
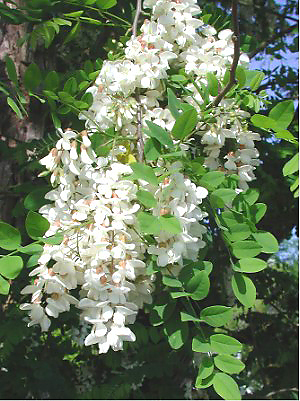
- Flowers of a living Robinia
  †Robinia
  - †Robinia californica
- Robulus
  - †Robulus alatolimbatus
  - †Robulus arcuatostriatus
  - †Robulus clericii
  - †Robulus clypeiformis – or unidentified comparable form
  - †Robulus inornatus
  - †Robulus insuetus
  - †Robulus kincaidi
  - †Robulus mayi
  - †Robulus mexicanus
  - †Robulus nikobarensis
  - †Robulus propinquus
  - †Robulus simplex
  - †Robulus terryi – or unidentified comparable form
  - †Robulus warmani
  - †Robulus welchi
- †Rogenio
  - †Rogenio bowersi
  - †Rogenio solitudinis
  - †Rogenio vanclevei – type locality for species
- †Rotularia
  - †Rotularia tejonense
- †Russellagus

== S ==
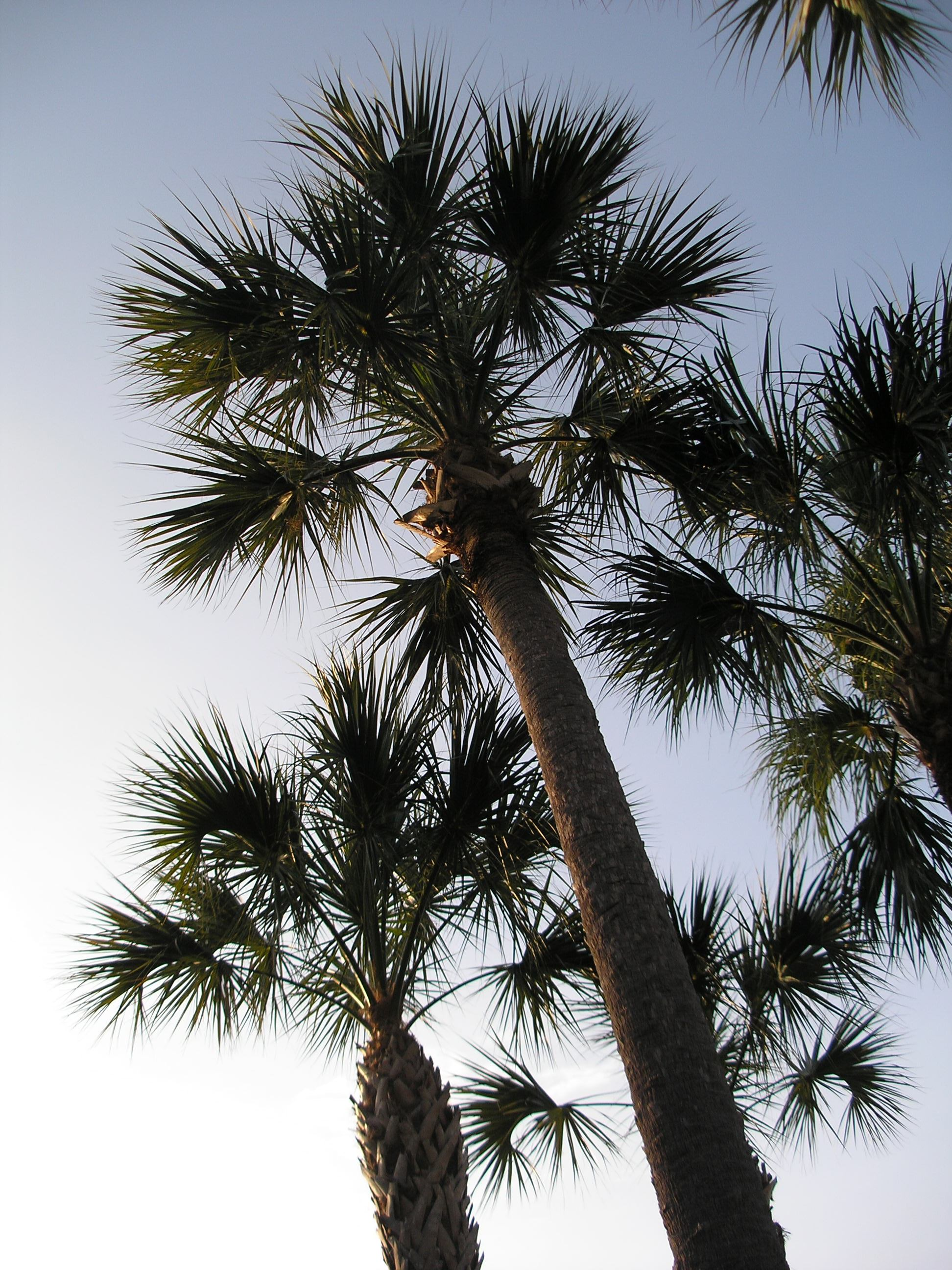
- Living Sabal, or palmettos
  Sabal
  - †Sabal miocenica
- †Sabalites
  - †Sabalites californicus
- Saccella
  - †Saccella alaeformis
  - †Saccella gabbi
  - †Saccella taphria
- Sagmatias
- †Sainguinolaria
  - †Sainguinolaria toulai – or unidentified comparable form
- Salix
  - †Salix boisiensis
  - †Salix edenensis
  - †Salix hesperia
  - †Salix ionensis
  - †Salix laevigatoides
  - †Salix pelviga
  - †Salix storeyana
  - †Salix wildcatensis
- †Salumiphocaena
  - †Salumiphocaena stocktoni – type locality for species
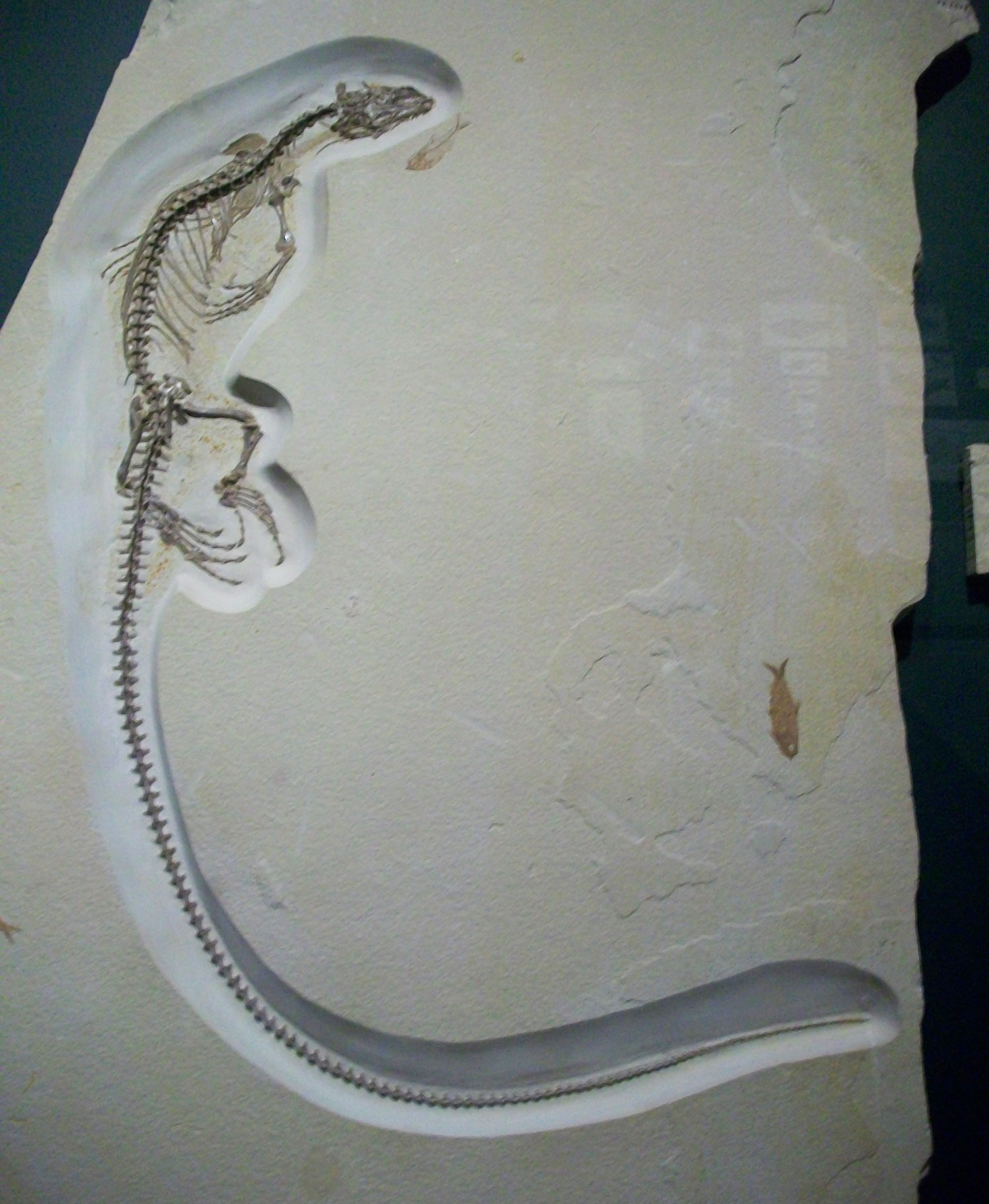
- Fossilized skeleton of the Eocene monitor lizard Saniwa
  †Saniwa
  - †Saniwa ensidens – type locality for species
- †Sapindus
  - †Sapindus oklahomensis
- Saracenaria – tentative report
  - †Saracenaria acutiauricularis – or unidentified comparable form
- †Sarda
  - †Sarda stockii – type locality for species
- Sassia
  - †Sassia bilineata
- Saxidomus
  - †Saxidomus gigantea
  - †Saxidomus giganteus
  - †Saxidomus nuttalli
  - †Saxidomus vaquerosensis
- †Saxolucina
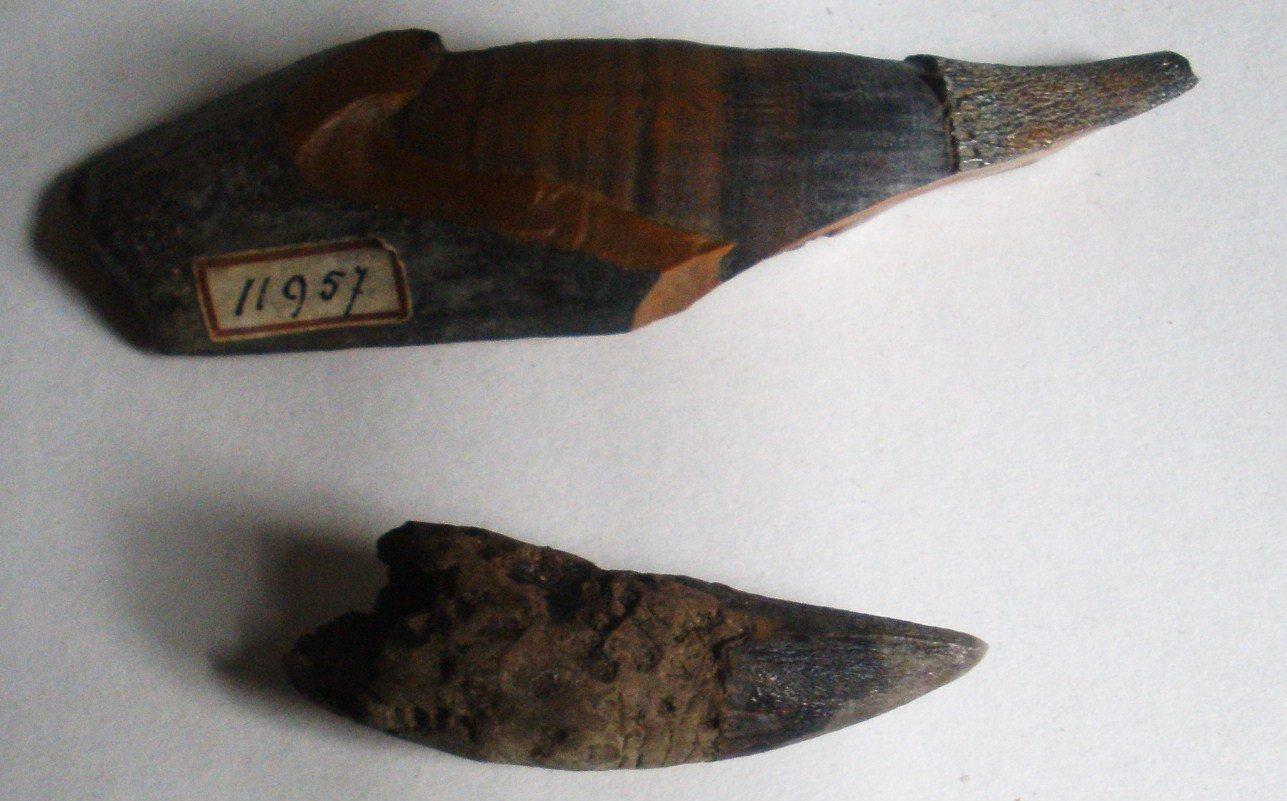
- Fossilized teeth of the Neogene sperm whale Scaldicetus
  †Scaldicetus
  - †Scaldicetus grandis – or unidentified comparable form
- †Scalopoides
- Scapanus
  - †Scapanus latimanus
  - †Scapanus malatinus
  - †Scapanus shultzi – type locality for species
- Scaphander
  - †Scaphander costatus
  - †Scaphander jugularis
- Scapharca
  - †Scapharca obispoana
- Scaphinotus
  - †Scaphinotus interruptus
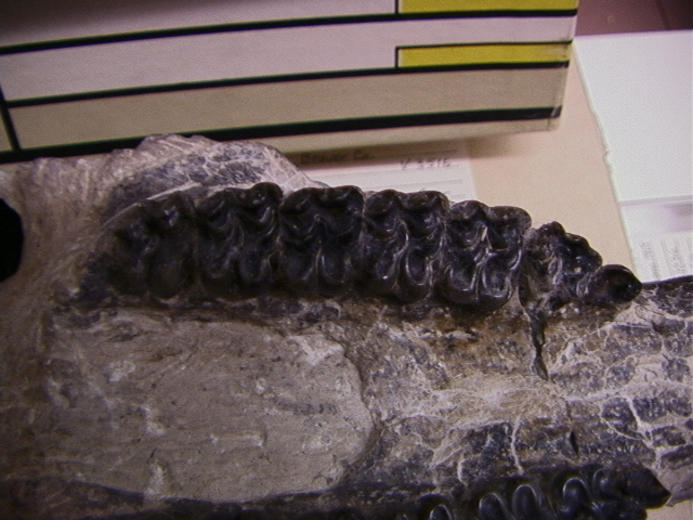
- Fossilized jaw and teeth of the Miocene horse Scaphohippus
  †Scaphohippus
  - †Scaphohippus intermontanus – type locality for species
  - †Scaphohippus sumani – type locality for species
- Sceloporus
  - †Sceloporus occidentalis
- †Scenopagus
  - †Scenopagus curtidens
  - †Scenopagus priscus – or unidentified comparable form
- †Schaubeumys
- †Schedocardia – tentative report
- †Schistomerus – type locality for genus
  - †Schistomerus californense – type locality for species
- Schizaster
  - †Schizaster diabloensis
  - †Schizaster lecontei
  - †Schizaster martinezensis
- †Schizodontomys
- †Sciuravus
  - †Sciuravus powayensis
- Sciurus
- Scomber
  - †Scomber sanctaemonicae
- †Scomberesox
  - †Scomberesox acutillus – type locality for species
  - †Scomberesox edwardsi – type locality for species
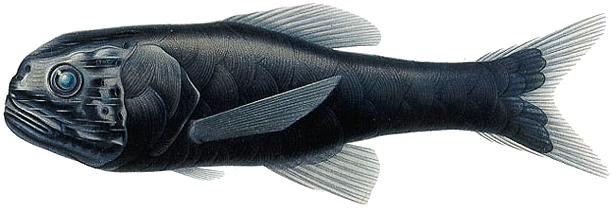
- Illustration of a living Scopelogadus ridgehead
  Scopelogadus
  - †Scopelogadus mizolepis
- †Scutella
  - †Scutella fairbanksi
  - †Scutella fairbanski
  - †Scutella merriami
  - †Scutella norrisi
  - †Scutella vaquerosensis
- †Scutellaster
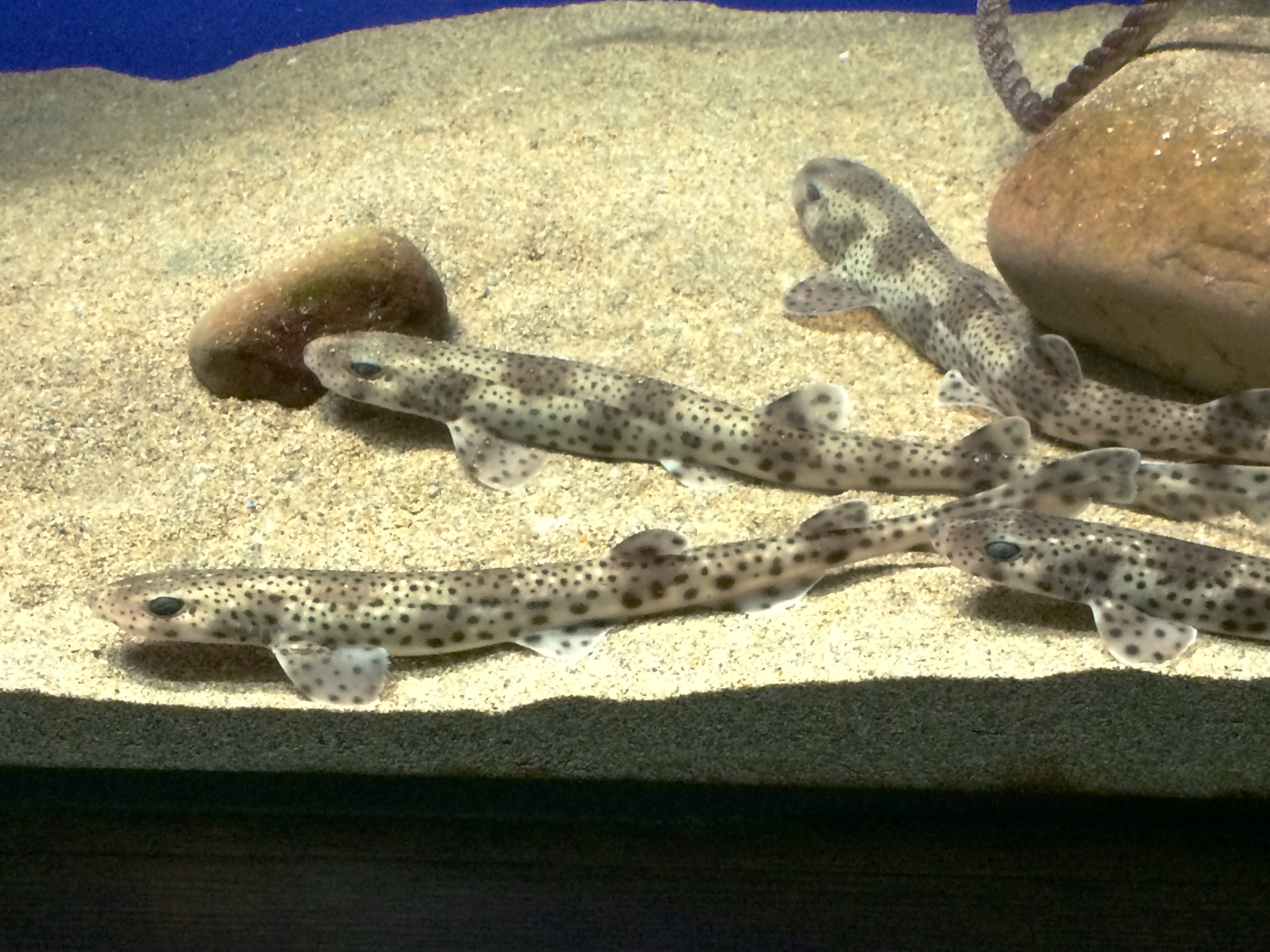
- Group of living Scyliorhinus catsharks
  Scyliorhinus
- †Scymnorhinus
  - †Scymnorhinus occidentalis
- Searlesia
  - †Searlesia dira
- †Sebastavus – type locality for genus
  - †Sebastavus vertebralis – type locality for species
- †Sebastodes
  - †Sebastodes apostates
  - †Sebastodes haroldi – type locality for species
  - †Sebastodes ineziae
  - †Sebastodes porteousi
  - †Sebastodes porteus
  - †Sebastodes rosae
- Seila
  - †Seila montereyensis
- Semelangulus
  - †Semelangulus tenuilirata
- Semele – tentative report
- Semele
  - †Semele decisa
  - †Semele diabloi
  - †Semele morani
  - †Semele packardi
  - †Semele pulchra
  - †Semele rubropicta
  - †Semele venusta
- Semicassis
  - †Semicassis louella – type locality for species
  - †Semicassis tuberculiformis
- Semicossyphus
- †Semirostrum – type locality for genus
  - †Semirostrum ceruttii – type locality for species
- Septifer
  - †Septifer bifurcatus
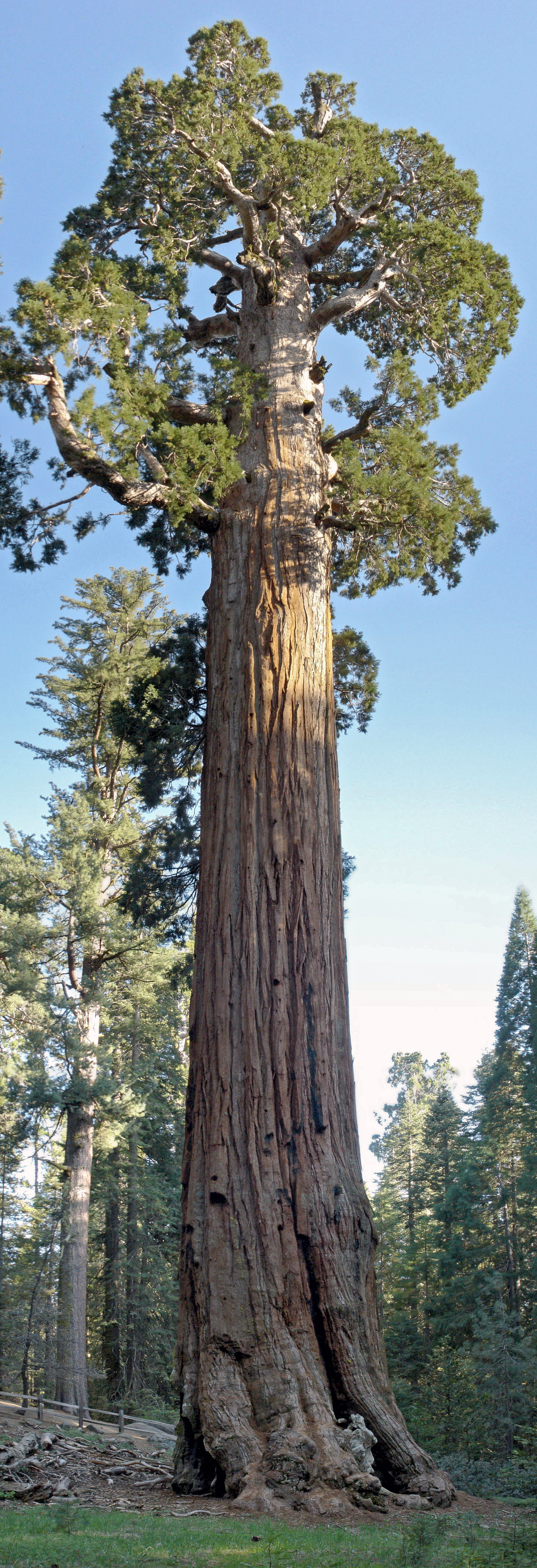
- A living Sequoiadendron
  †Sequoiadendron
  - †Sequoiadendron chaneyi
- †Serbelodon
  - †Serbelodon burnhami
- Serica
  - †Serica kanakoffi – type locality for species
- Seriola
  - †Seriola sanctaebarbarae
- Seriphus
  - †Seriphus politus
- Serpula
  - †Serpula coreyi
- Serpulorbis
  - †Serpulorbis llajasensis
- †Sespedectes
  - †Sespedectes singularis – type locality for species
  - †Sespedectes stocki
- †Sespemys
  - †Sespemys thurstoni – type locality for species
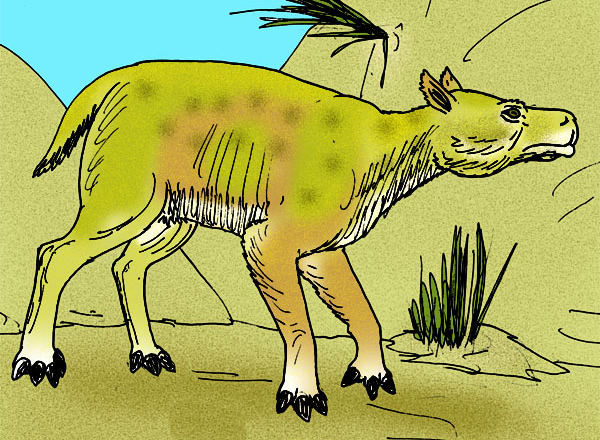
- Life restoration of two species of the Oligocene oreodont mammal genus Sespia
  †Sespia
  - †Sespia californica – type locality for species
  - †Sespia nitida
- Siderastrea
  - †Siderastrea clarki – type locality for species
  - †Siderastrea mendenhalli – type locality for species
- Sigmodon
  - †Sigmodon lindsayi
  - †Sigmodon minor
- Sigmoilina – tentative report
- Siliqua
  - †Siliqua lucida
  - †Siliqua media – or unidentified comparable form
  - †Siliqua patula – or unidentified related form
- †Simiacritomys
  - †Simiacritomys whistleri – type locality for species
- †Simidectes
  - †Simidectes medius – or unidentified comparable form
  - †Simidectes merriami – type locality for species
- †Simimeryx
  - †Simimeryx hudsoni – type locality for species
- †Simimys
  - †Simimys landeri – type locality for species
  - †Simimys simplex
- Simomactra
  - †Simomactra dolabriformis
  - †Simomactra falcata
  - †Simomactra planulata
- †Sinomactra
  - †Sinomactra falcata
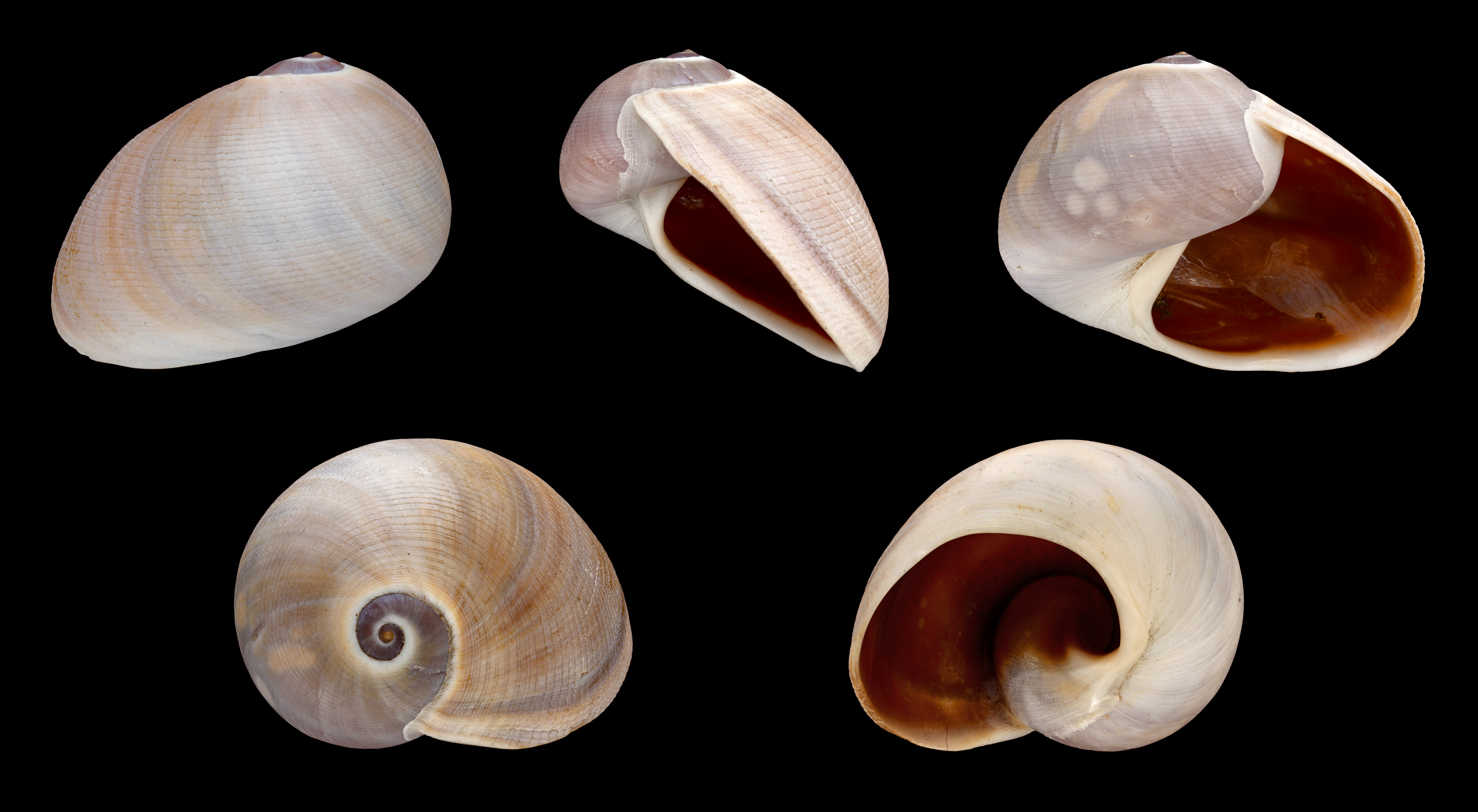
- Several views of the shell of a Sinum moon snail
  Sinum
  - †Sinum debile – or unidentified comparable form
  - †Sinum obliquum
  - †Sinum scopulosum
- Siphonalia
  - †Siphonalia andersoni
  - †Siphonalia lineata
  - †Siphonalia merriami
  - †Siphonalia sutterensis – or unidentified comparable form
- Skenea
  - †Skenea californica
- †Smilax
  - †Smilax diforma
  - †Smilax labidurommae
  - †Smilax magna – or unidentified comparable form
  - †Smilax remingtonii
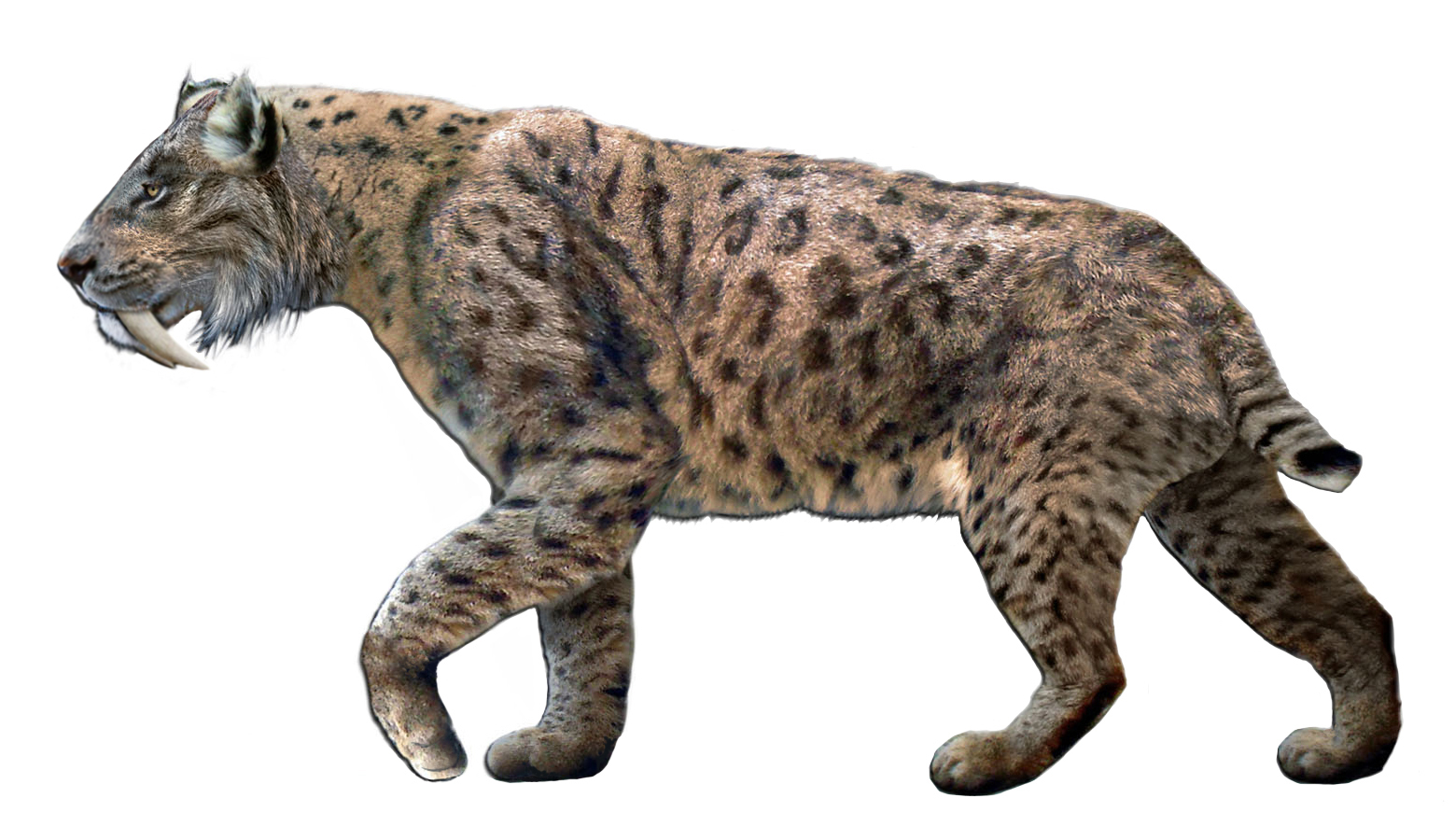
- Life restoration of the Pleistocene-Holocene saber-tooth cat Smilodon
  †Smilodon
  - †Smilodon fatalis
  - †Smilodon gracilis
- †Smilodonichthyes
  - †Smilodonichthyes rastrosus
- †Smilodonichthys
- †Smilodonicthyes
  - †Smilodonicthyes rastrosus
- †Smithites – type locality for genus
  - †Smithites elegans – type locality for species
- Solariella
  - †Solariella hartleyensis – type locality for species
  - †Solariella peramabilis
  - †Solariella walkeri – type locality for species
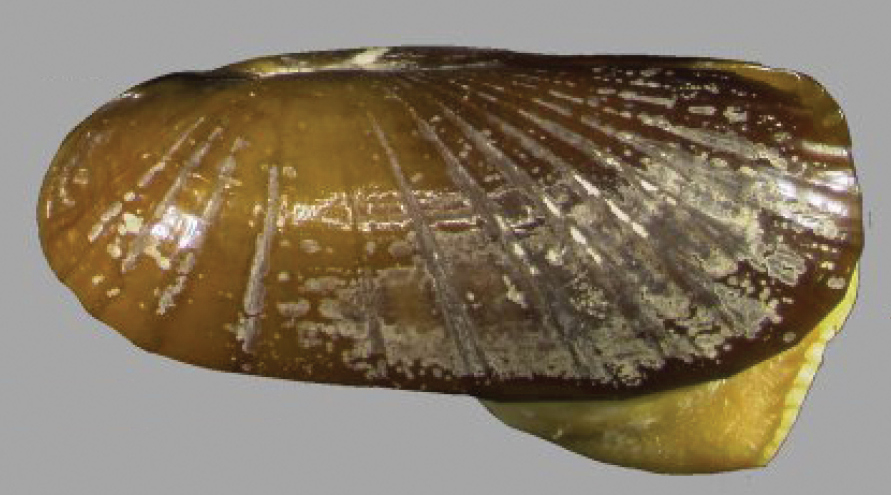
- Modern specimen of the marine bivalve Solemya
  Solemya
  - †Solemya ventricosa
- Solen
  - †Solen curtis – or unidentified comparable form
  - †Solen rosaceus
  - †Solen sicarius
- Solena
  - †Solena conradi
  - †Solena gravidus
  - †Solena lorenzana
  - †Solena parallelus – or unidentified comparable form
  - †Solena perrini
  - †Solena stantoni
  - †Solena subverticala
- Solenastrea
  - †Solenastrea fairbanksi
- Solenosteira
  - †Solenosteira anomala
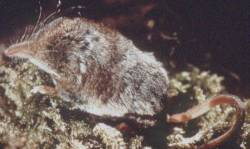
- A living Sorex, or long-tailed shrew
  Sorex
  - †Sorex leahyi
- Spathipora
- Spermophilus
  - †Spermophilus argonautus
  - †Spermophilus beecheyi
  - †Spermophilus lateralis
- †Sphaeroidina
  - †Sphaeroidina gredalensis
- Sphenia – tentative report
  - †Sphenia meganosensis – type locality for species
- †Sphenophalos – tentative report
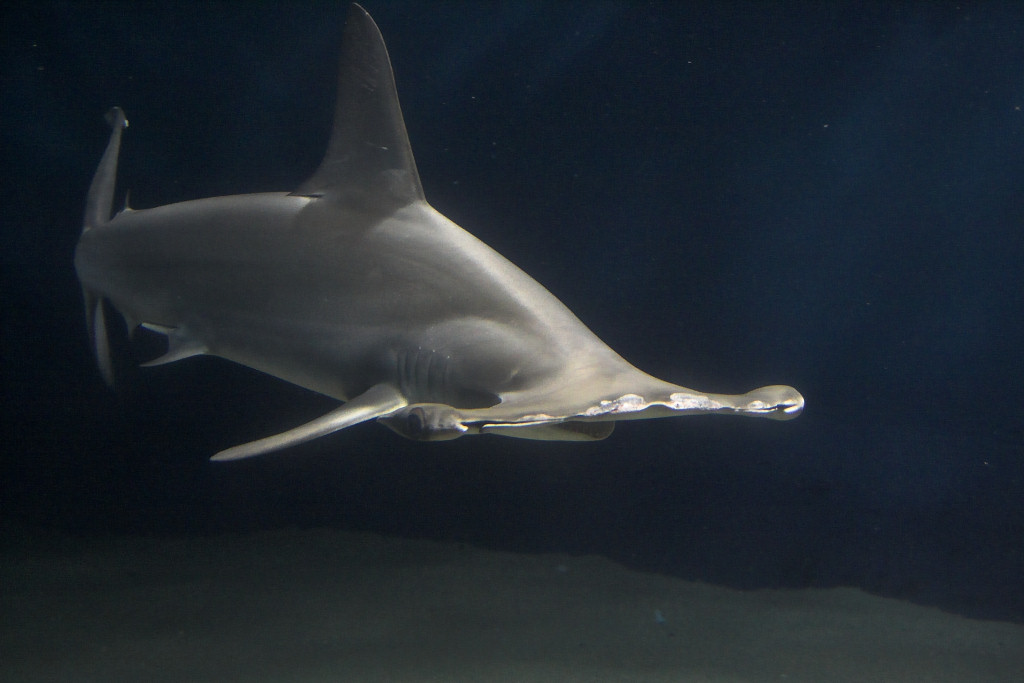
- A living Sphyrna hammerhead shark
  Sphyrna
  - †Sphyrna aus
  - †Sphyrna bus
- Spilogale
  - †Spilogale putorius
- †Spirocrypta
  - †Spirocrypta inornata
  - †Spirocrypta pileum
- Spiroglyphus
  - †Spiroglyphus lituella
  - †Spiroglyphus tinajasensis
- Spiroloculina
  - †Spiroloculina lamposa
- Spiroplectammina
  - †Spiroplectammina coreyi – type locality for species
  - †Spiroplectammina eocenica
  - †Spiroplectammina kewi – type locality for species
- Spirotropis
  - †Spirotropis bulimoides
  - †Spirotropis perversa
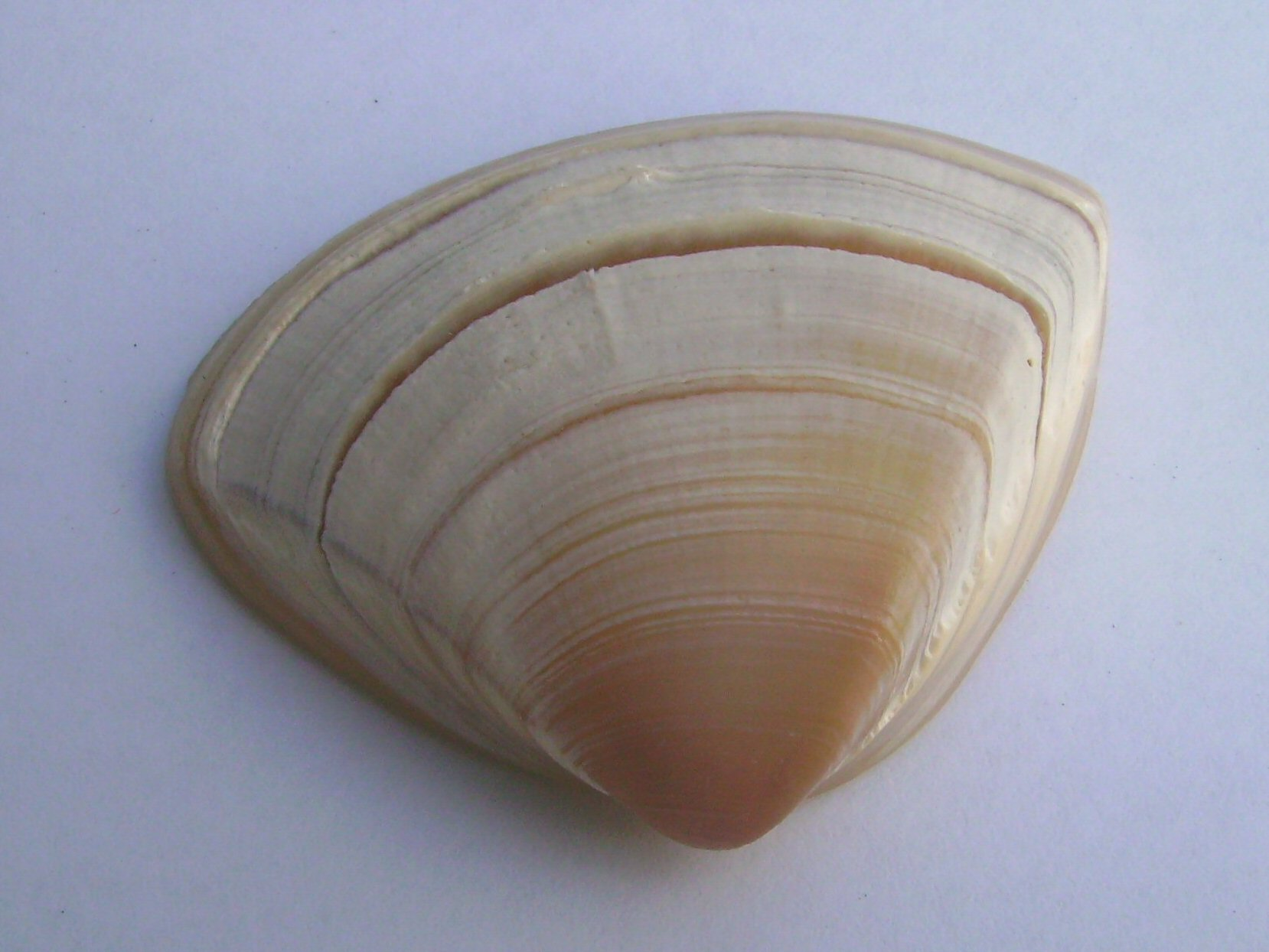
- Shell of a Spisula, or surf clam
  Spisula
  - †Spisula coosensis
  - †Spisula densatum – type locality for species
  - †Spisula meganosensis – type locality for species
  - †Spisula pabloensis
  - †Spisula packardi
  - †Spisula panzanum
- Spondylus
  - †Spondylus bostrychites
  - †Spondylus calcifer
  - †Spondylus carlosensis
  - †Spondylus perrini
  - †Spondylus vaquerosensis
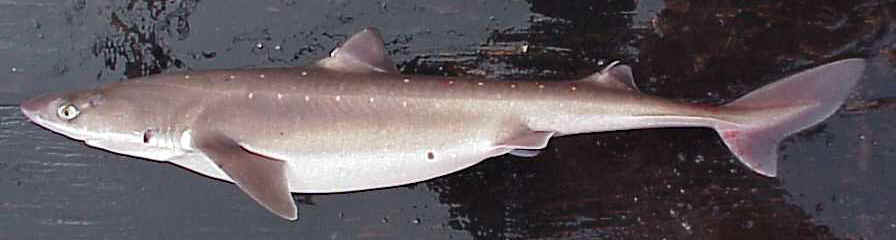
- A living Squalus, or spurdog
  Squalus
  - †Squalus sericulus
  - †Squalus serriculus
- Squatina
  - †Squatina californica – or unidentified comparable form
  - †Squatina claifornica
  - †Squatina lerichei
- Squilla
  - †Squilla laingae
- †Starrias – type locality for genus
  - †Starrias ischyrus – type locality for species
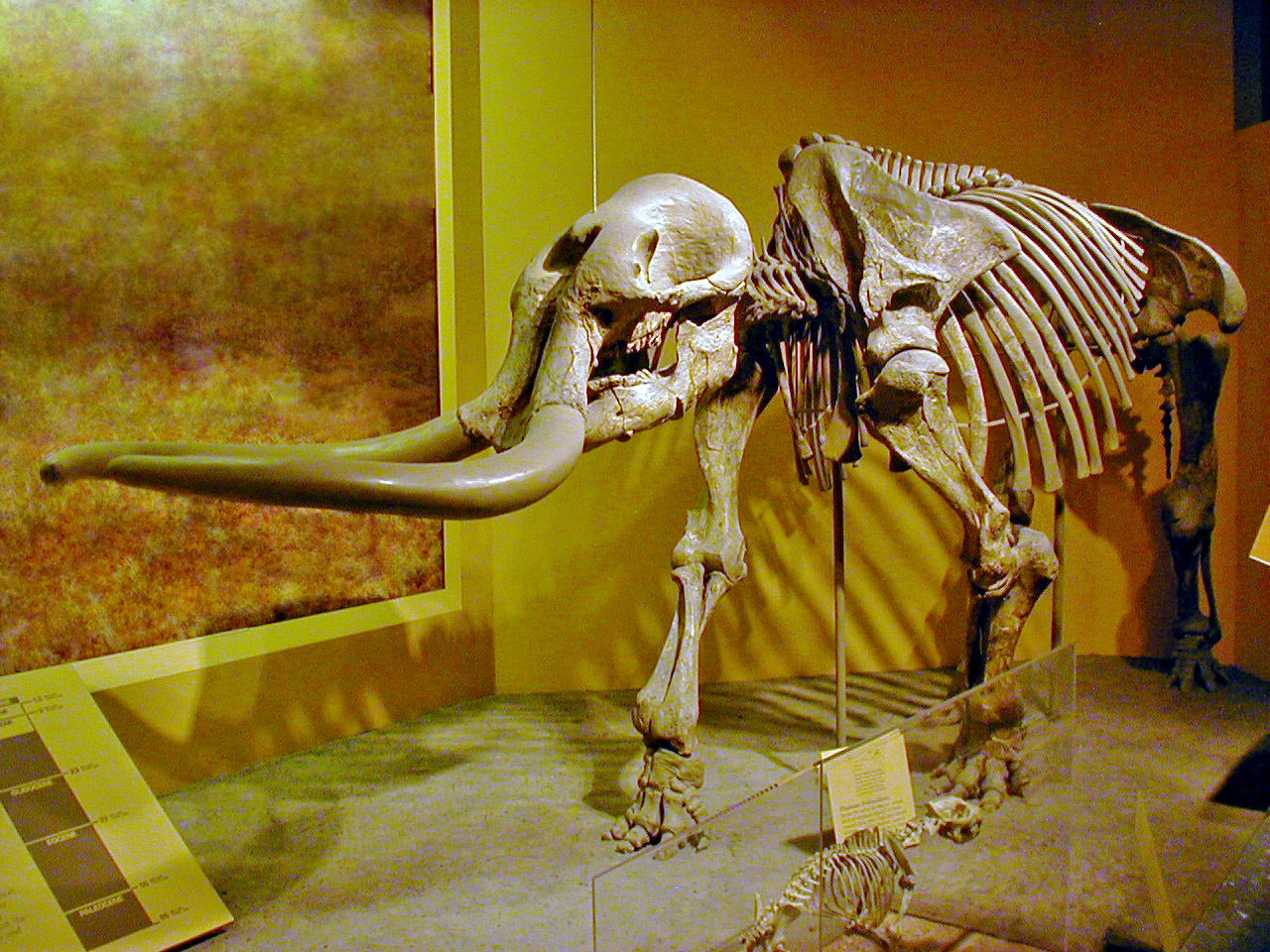
- Mounted fossilized skeleton of the Pliocene-Pleistocene elephant relative Stegomastodon
  †Stegomastodon
  - †Stegomastodon mirificus – or unidentified comparable form
- Stenella
- †Stenomylus
  - †Stenomylus hitchcocki – or unidentified comparable form
- Stenoplax
  - †Stenoplax conspicua
  - †Stenoplax magdalenensis
- Stephanodiscus
  - †Stephanodiscus asteroides
  - †Stephanodiscus carconensis
  - †Stephanodiscus excentricus
  - †Stephanodiscus hantzchii
  - †Stephanodiscus hantzschii
- †Stephanophyllia
  - †Stephanophyllia californica – type locality for species
  - †Stephanophyllia vacavillensis
- Stercorarius
- Sterna
  - †Sterna neglecta
- †Sternbergia – type locality for genus
  - †Sternbergia waitei – type locality for species
- Sthenictis
- †Stichocassidulina
  - †Stichocassidulina thalmanni
- †Stictocarbo
  - †Stictocarbo kumeyaay – type locality for species
- †Stockia – type locality for genus
  - †Stockia powayensis – type locality for species
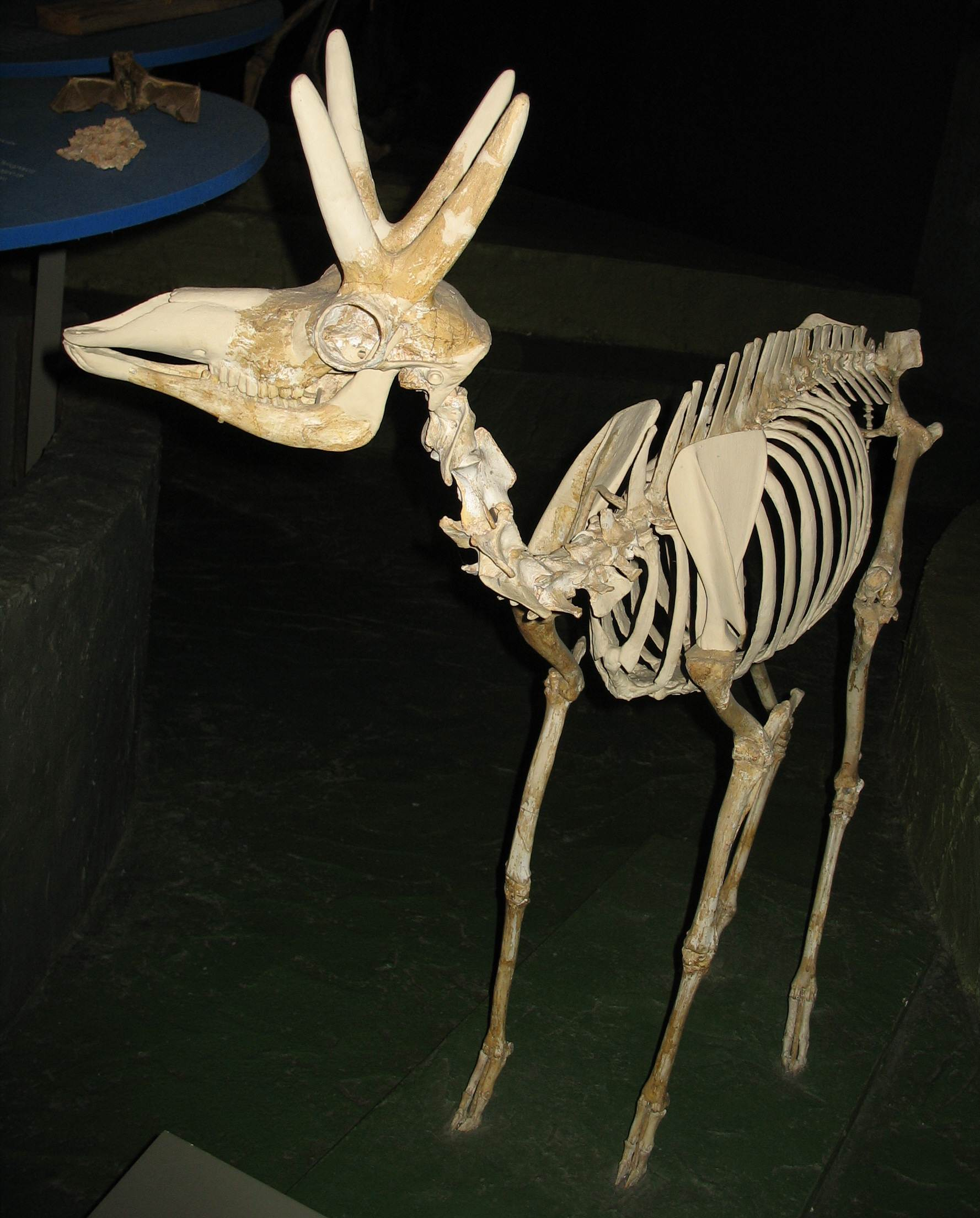
- Mounted fossilized skeleton of the fossil pronghorn Stockoceros
  †Stockoceros – or unidentified comparable form
- Stomias
  - †Stomias affinis
- Stramonita
  - †Stramonita biserialis
  - †Stramonita canaliculata
  - †Stramonita imperialis
- †Strepsidura
  - †Strepsidura diabloensis – type locality for species
  - †Strepsidura ficus – tentative report
  - †Strepsidura lincolnensis
- †Streptochetus
  - †Streptochetus californiana – type locality for species
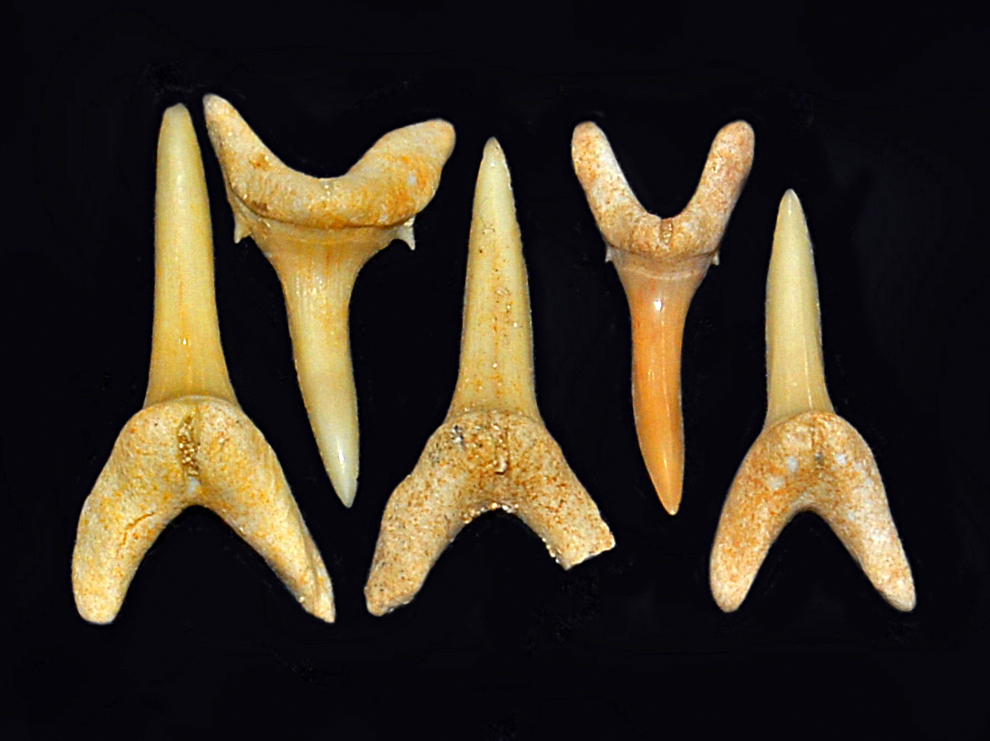
- Fossilized teeth of the Paleocene-Miocene sandshark Striatolamia
  †Striatolamia
  - †Striatolamia macrota
- †Striostrea
  - †Striostrea freudenbergi
- Strioterebrum
  - †Strioterebrum gausapatum
- †Strobilites
  - †Strobilites temblorensis
- Strombiformis
  - †Strombiformis raymondi
- Strombus
  - †Strombus galeatus
  - †Strombus gracilior
- †Strongyliscus – type locality for genus
  - †Strongyliscus robustus – type locality for species
- Strongylocentrotus
- †Strongylodon
  - †Strongylodon falcata
- Strophocardia
  - †Strophocardia megastropha
- Sturnella
  - †Sturnella negecta
- †Stylemys
  - †Stylemys neglectus – type locality for species
- Subcancilla
  - †Subcancilla sulcata
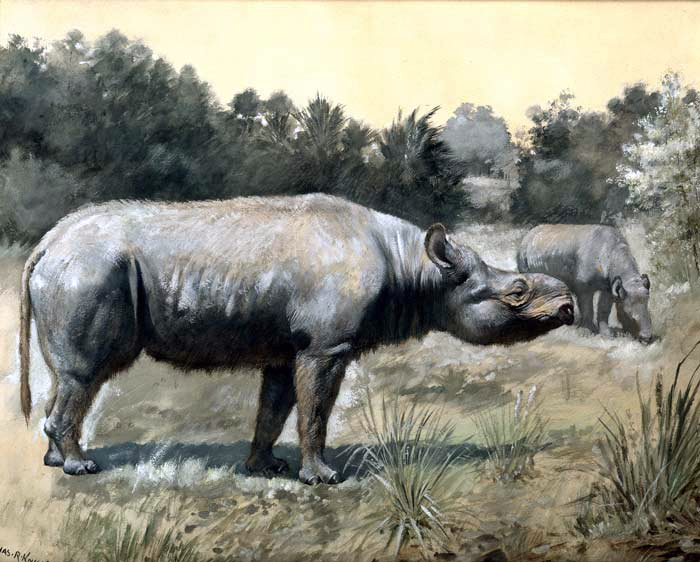
- Life restoration of the Eocene-Oligocene cow-sized rhinoceros Subhyracodon. Charles R. Knight (1890s).
  †Subhyracodon
  - †Subhyracodon kewi
- Succinea
- †Suggrunda
- Sula
  - †Sula clarki – type locality for species
  - †Sula pohli – type locality for species
  - †Sula willetti – type locality for species
- †Sulcocypraea
  - †Sulcocypraea moumieti
- Sulcoretusa
  - †Sulcoretusa xystrum
- Surculites
  - †Surculites aequilateralis
  - †Surculites carpentaria
  - †Surculites carpenteriana
  - †Surculites carpenterianus
  - †Surculites isoformis
  - †Surculites keepi – or unidentified comparable form
  - †Surculites mathewsoni
  - †Surculites mathewsonii
  - †Surculites remondi
  - †Surculites remondii
- †Surculities – tentative report
- †Syllomus – or unidentified comparable form
  - †Syllomus aegyptiacus
- Sylvilagus
  - †Sylvilagus audubonii
  - †Sylvilagus bachmani
  - †Sylvilagus floridanus
  - †Sylvilagus hibbardi
- Syncera
  - †Syncera translucens
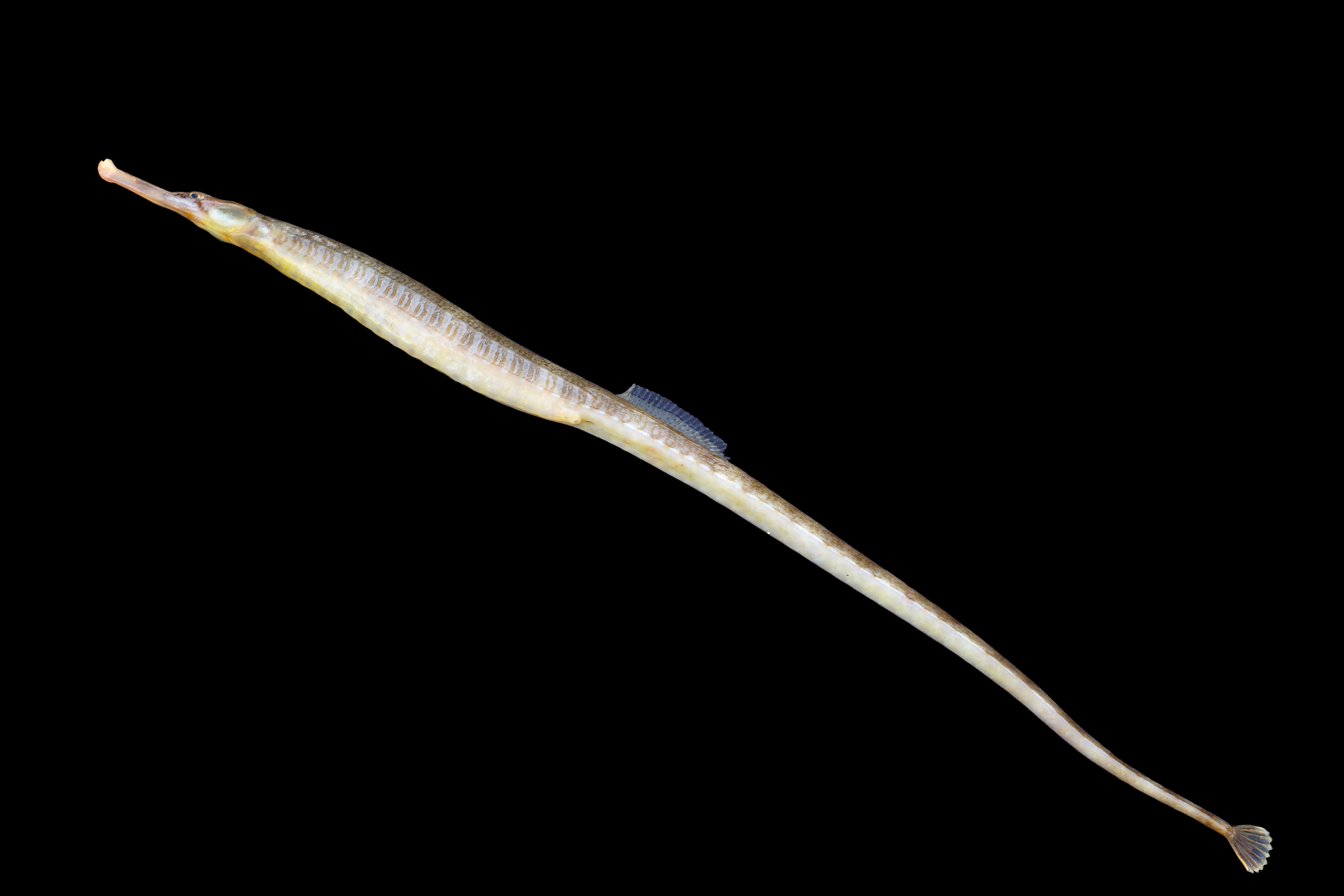
- A living Syngnathus pipefish
  Syngnathus
  - †Syngnathus avus – type locality for species
- †Synthiboramphus
  - †Synthiboramphus antiquus
- Synthliboramphus
  - †Synthliboramphus antiquus
  - †Synthliboramphus hypoleucas
  - †Synthliboramphus hypoleucus
  - †Synthliboramphus rineyi – type locality for species
- †Synthliboraramphus
  - †Synthliboraramphus antiquus

== T ==
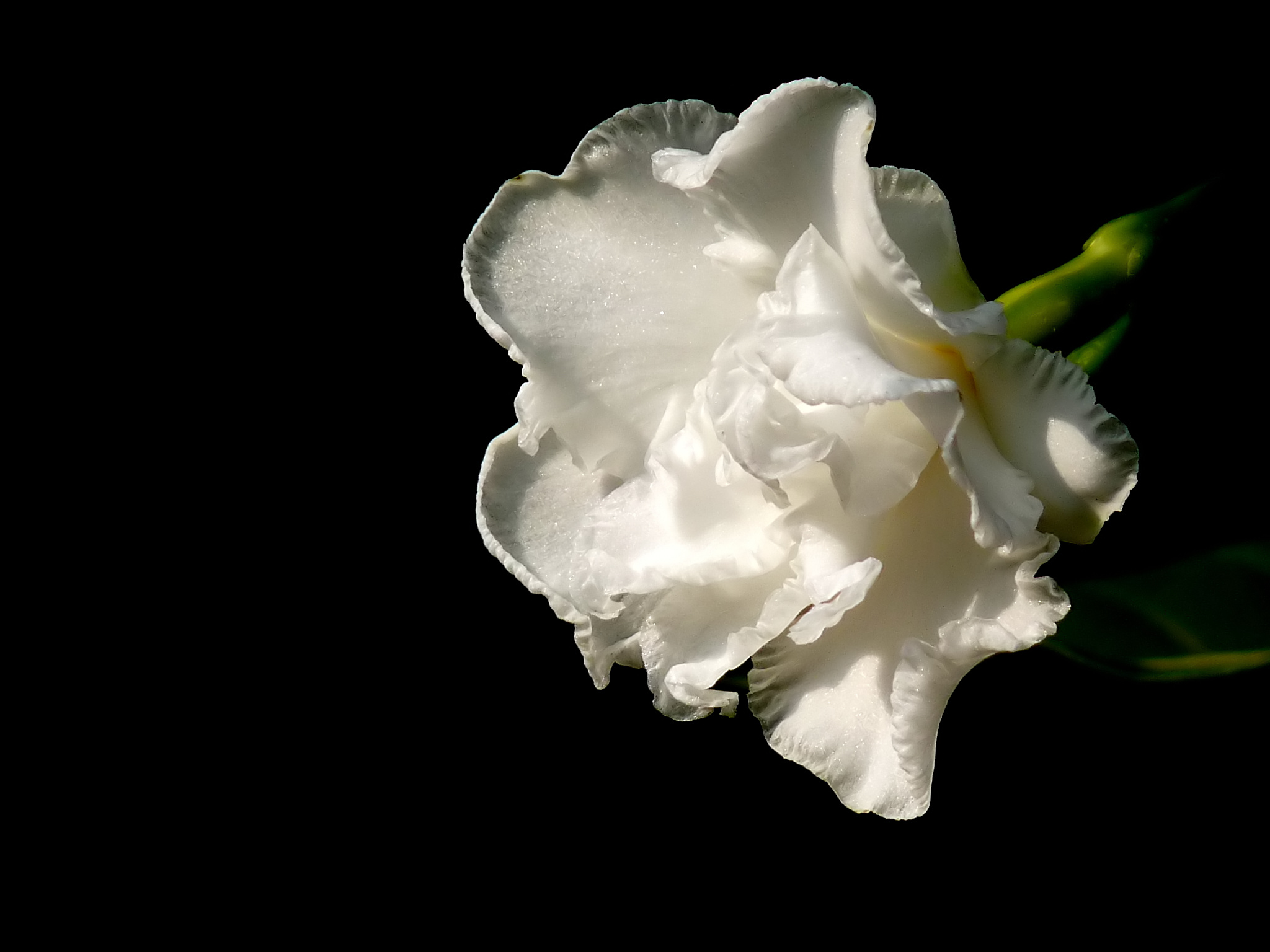
- Flower of a living Tabernaemontana, or milkwood
  †Tabernaemontana
  - †Tabernaemontana chrysophylloides
- Tadorna
  - †Tadorna tadorna
- Tagelus
  - †Tagelus affinis
  - †Tagelus californianus
  - †Tagelus clarki – type locality for species
  - †Tagelus subteres
- Tamias
  - †Tamias ateles – type locality for species
- Tamiasciurus
  - †Tamiasciurus hudsonicus
- Tamiosoma
  - †Tamiosoma gregaria – type locality for species
- †Tanymykter
  - †Tanymykter brachyodontus
- Tapirus
  - †Tapirus californicus
  - †Tapirus haysii
  - †Tapirus merriami – type locality for species
- †Tapochoerus
  - †Tapochoerus egressus – type locality for species
  - †Tapochoerus mcmillini – type locality for species
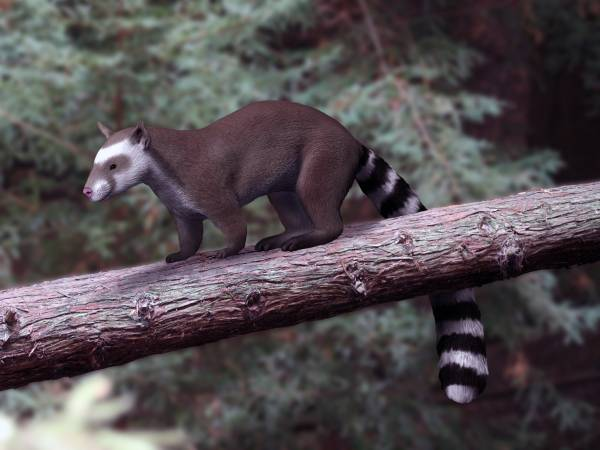
- Life restoration of the Eocene carnivoran relative Tapocyon
  †Tapocyon
  - †Tapocyon dawsonae – type locality for species
  - †Tapocyon robustus
- †Tapomys
  - †Tapomys tapensis
- Taranis
  - †Taranis incultus
- Taricha
- Taxidea
  - †Taxidea taxus
- Tayassu
  - †Tayassu edensis
- Tegula
  - †Tegula – type locality for species informal
  - †Tegula aureotincta
  - †Tegula eiseni
  - †Tegula ligulata
- †Tejonia
  - †Tejonia lajollaensis – or unidentified comparable form
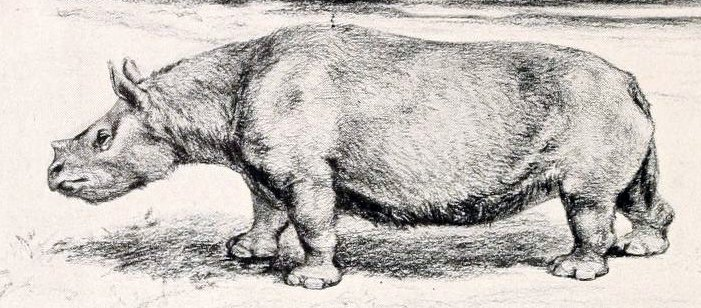
- Restoration of the Miocene-Pliocene rhinoceros Teleoceras
  †Teleoceras
  - †Teleoceras fossiger
  - †Teleoceras hicksi
  - †Teleoceras mediocronutum
  - †Teleoceras meridianum
- †Teletaceras
  - †Teletaceras mortivallis
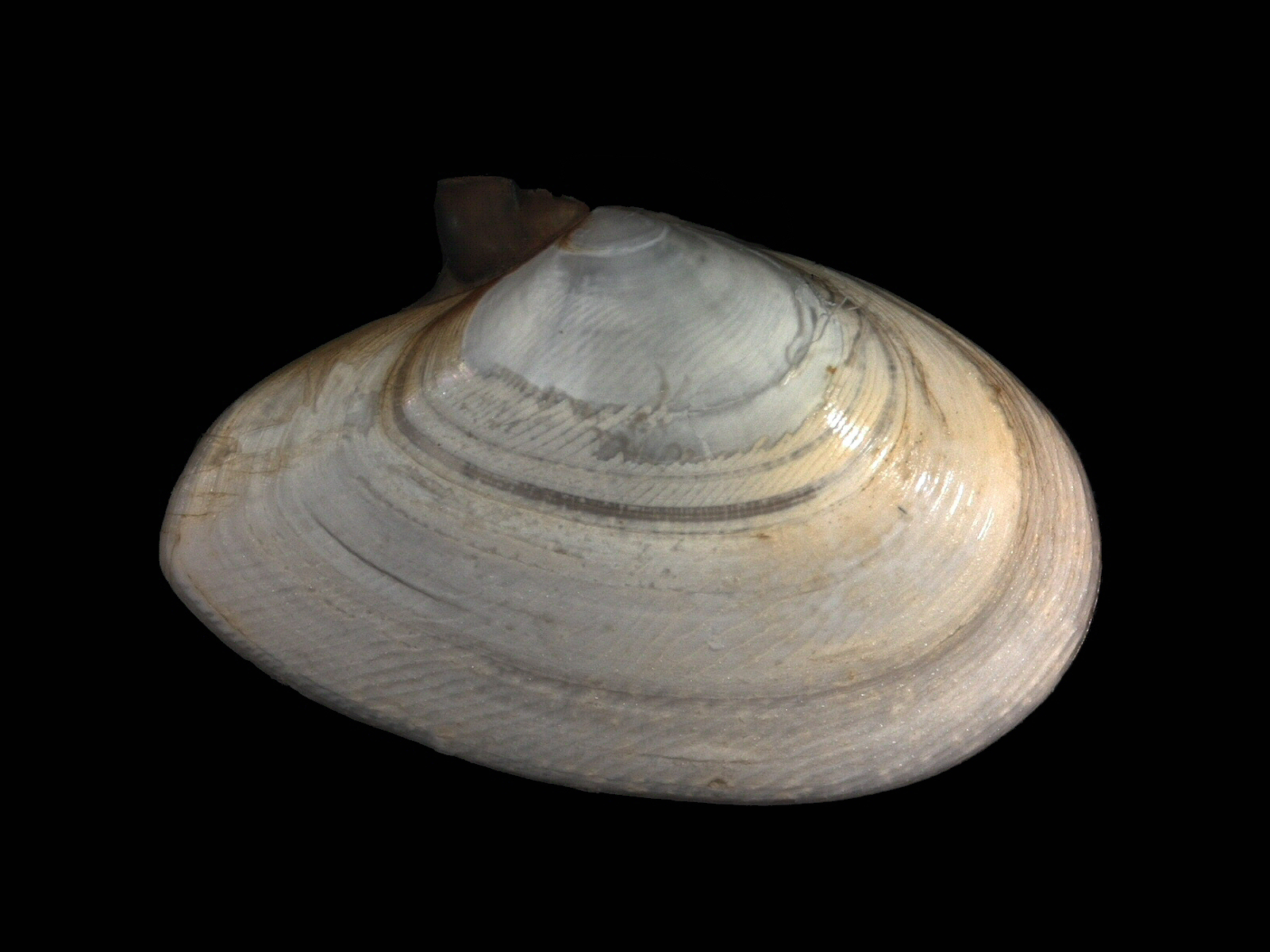
- Shell of a Tellina, or tellin
  Tellina
  - †Tellina bodegensis
  - †Tellina cowlitzensis – or unidentified related form
  - †Tellina emacerata
  - †Tellina eugenia
  - †Tellina idae
  - †Tellina kewi
  - †Tellina lebecki – or unidentified comparable form
  - †Tellina martinezensis
  - †Tellina meropsis
  - †Tellina nuculoides
  - †Tellina ocoyana
  - †Tellina oldroydi
  - †Tellina oregonensis
  - †Tellina piercei
  - †Tellina pittsburgensis
  - †Tellina remondii
  - †Tellina soledadensis – or unidentified comparable form
  - †Tellina tehachapi
  - †Tellina undulifera
  - †Tellina vancouverensis – or unidentified comparable form
  - †Tellina wilsoni
- †Temnocyon
  - †Temnocyon subferox – or unidentified comparable form
- Tenagodus
  - †Tenagodus californiensis
- †Tenudomys
  - †Tenudomys bodei
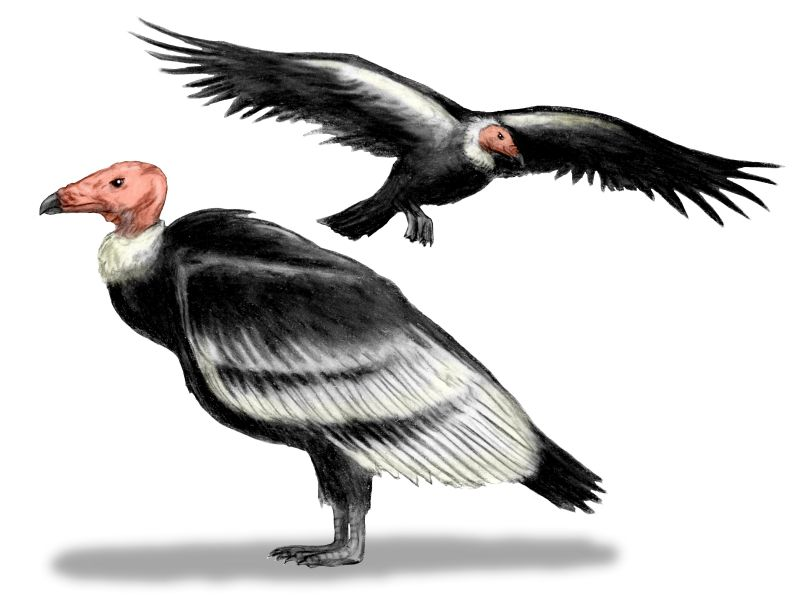
- Life restoration of the Pleistocene bird of prey Teratornis
  †Teratornis
  - †Teratornis merriami
- Terebellum
- Terebra
  - †Terebra albocincta
  - †Terebra californica
  - †Terebra danai
  - †Terebra pedroana
  - †Terebra protexta
  - †Terebra santana – type locality for species
- Terebratalia
  - †Terebratalia batequia – or unidentified related form
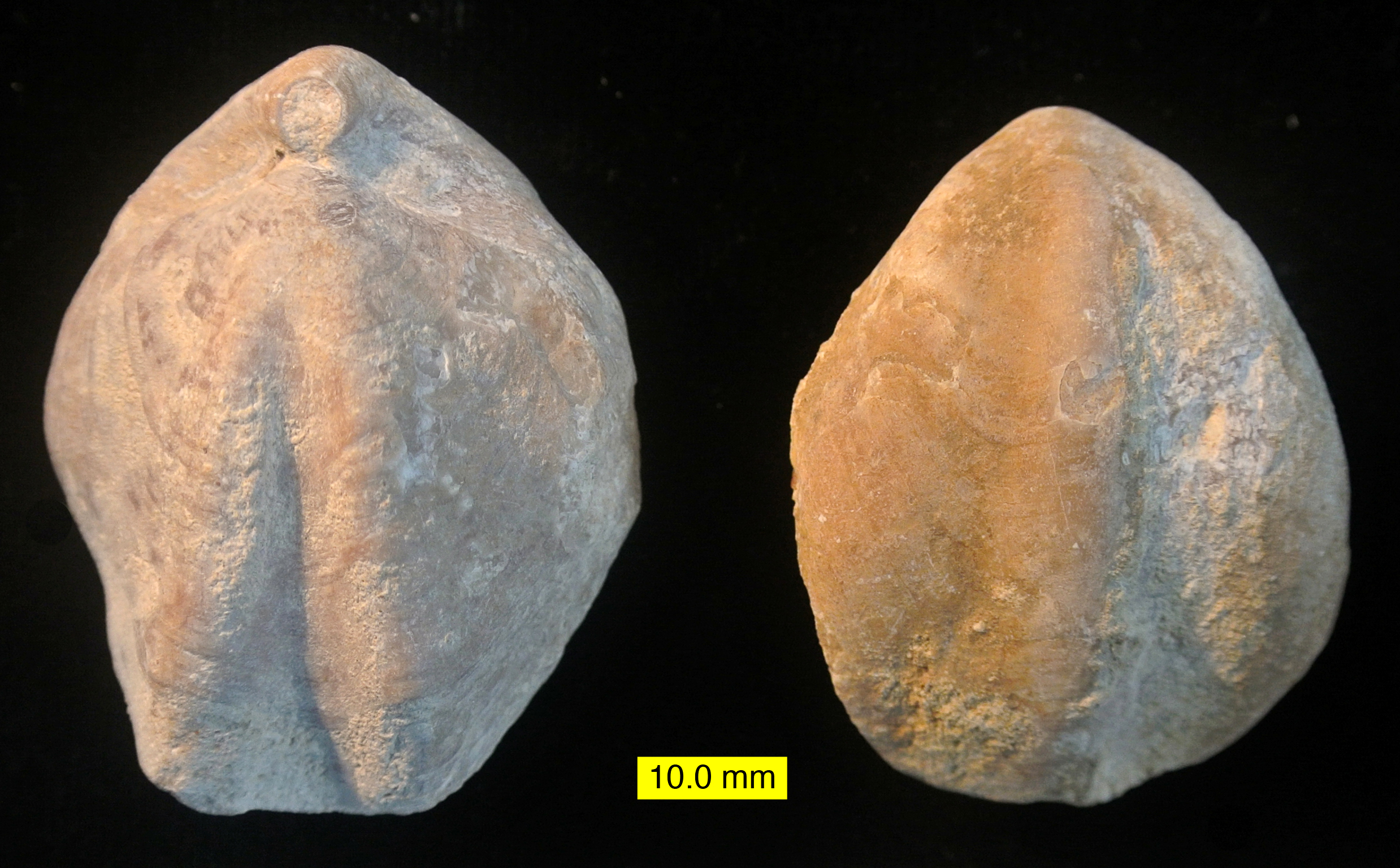
- Fossilized shell in two views of the Late Devonian-modern brachiopod Terebratula
  Terebratula
- Terebratulina
  - †Terebratulina tejonensis
  - †Terebratulina tejonensis waringi
- Teredo
- Terminalia
  - †Terminalia estamina
- †Tessarolax – tentative report
  - †Tessarolax inconspicua
- Testudo
- †Testudoolithus – or unidentified comparable form
- †Tetraclaenodon
  - †Tetraclaenodon puercensis
- Tetraclita
- †Tetrameryx
  - †Tetrameryx irvingtonensis – type locality for species
- †Texoceros
  - †Texoceros altidens – or unidentified comparable form
  - †Texoceros edensis – type locality for species
- Thais
  - †Thais carrizoensis
  - †Thais lamellosa
  - †Thais packi
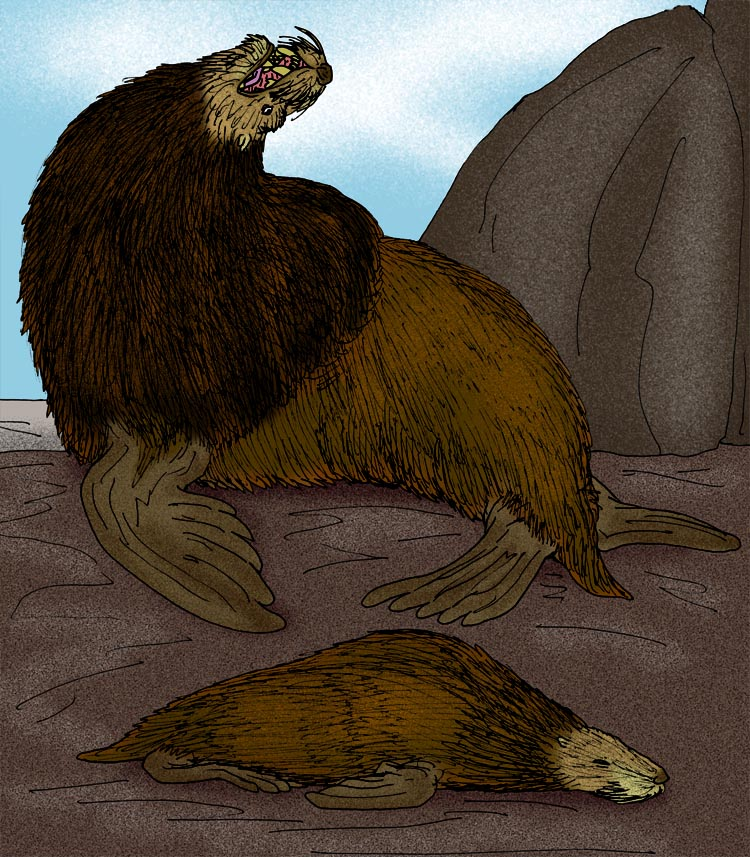
- Life restoration of the Miocene fur seal Thalassoleon
  †Thalassoleon
  - †Thalassoleon macnallyae – type locality for species
  - †Thalassoleon mexicanus
- †Thamnasteria
  - †Thamnasteria sinuata – type locality for species
- Thamnophis
- Thanatophilus
  - †Thanatophilus lapponicus
- †Thelyphonus
  - †Thelyphonus hadleyi – type locality for species
- Thomomys
  - †Thomomys bottae
  - †Thomomys gidleyi
  - †Thomomys leucodon
  - †Thomomys microdon – type locality for species
  - †Thomomys monticola
- †Thouinopsis
  - †Thouinopsis myricaefolia
- Thracia
  - †Thracia pedroana
  - †Thracia sorrentoensis – or unidentified comparable form
  - †Thracia undulata
- Thunnus – type locality for genus
  - †Thunnus starksi – type locality for species
- Thyasira
  - †Thyasira folgeri
- †Thyrsites
  - †Thyrsites kriegeri – type locality for species
- †Ticholeptus
  - †Ticholeptus zygomaticus
- Timoclea
  - †Timoclea picta
- Tinosaurus
  - †Tinosaurus stenodon – or unidentified comparable form
- †Tiphyocetus – type locality for genus
  - †Tiphyocetus temblorensis – type locality for species
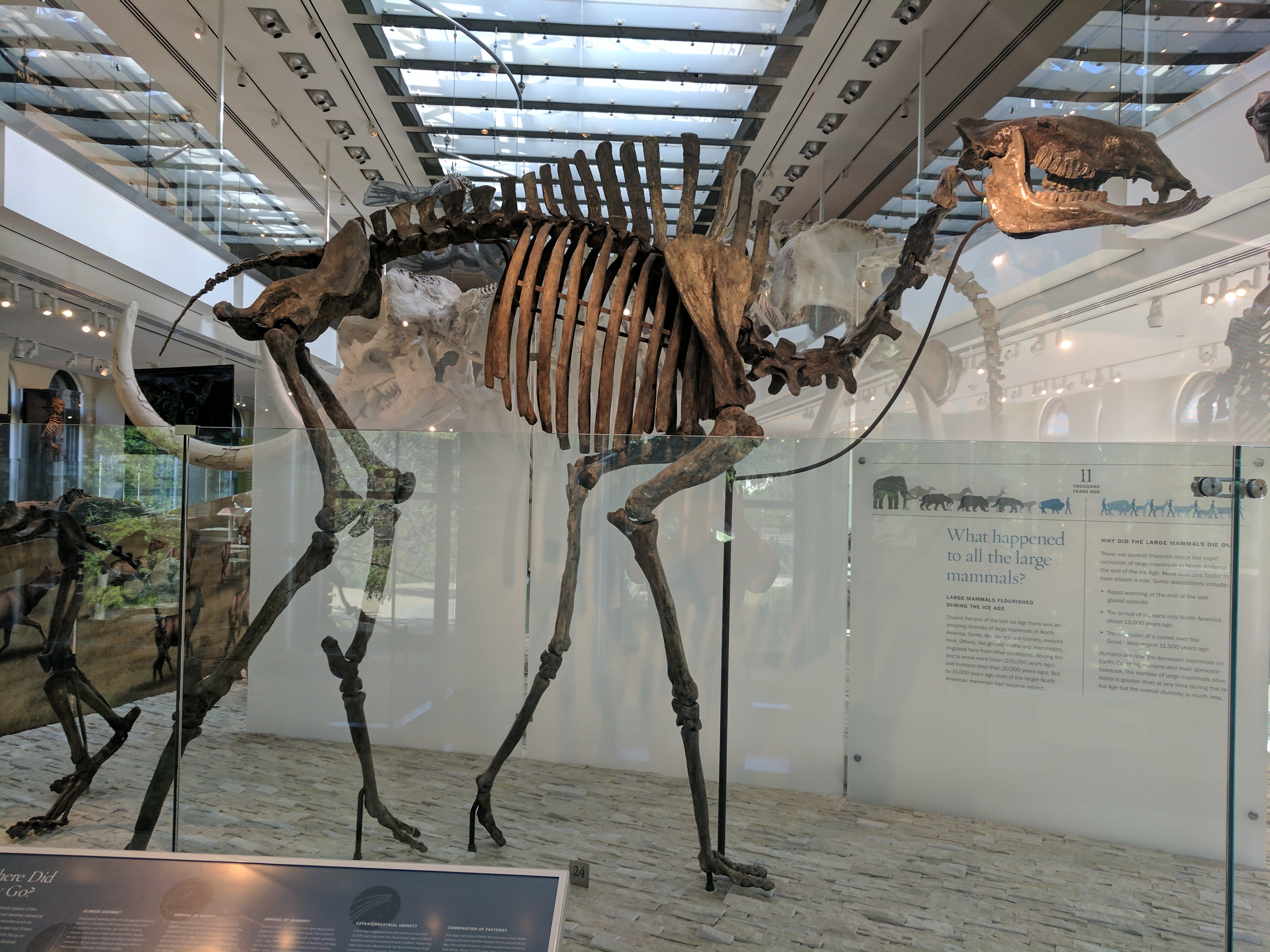
- Mounted fossilized skeleton of the Miocene-Pleistocene camel Titanotylopus
  †Titanotylopus
- Tivela
  - †Tivela diabloensis
  - †Tivela gabbi
  - †Tivela inezana
  - †Tivela kelloggensis
  - †Tivela stultorum
- †Tomarctus
  - †Tomarctus brevirostris
  - †Tomarctus hippophaga
  - †Tomarctus hippophagus – or unidentified comparable form
- †Topangasquilla
  - †Topangasquilla gravesi
- Torcula
  - †Torcula inezana
- †Tornatellaea
  - †Tornatellaea pinguis
- Totanus
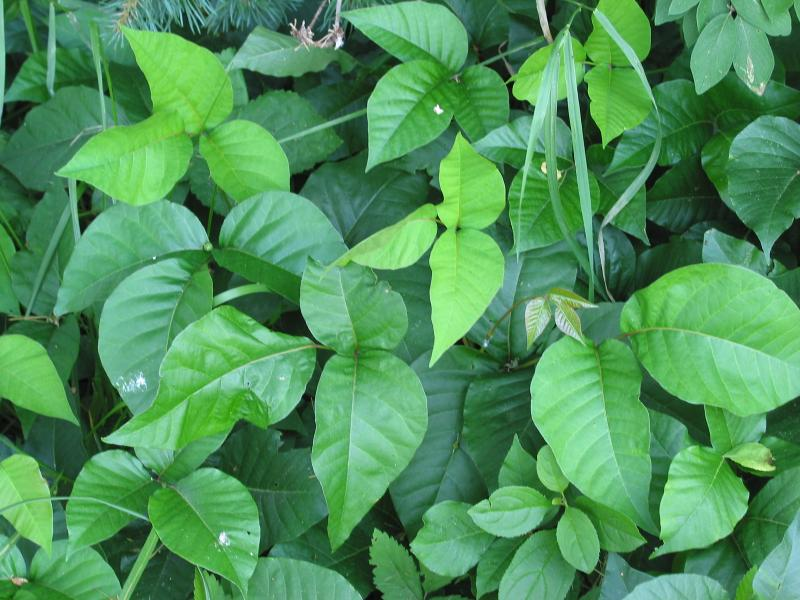
- Foliage of living Toxicodendron
  †Toxicodendron
  - †Toxicodendron franciscana
- Toxopneustes
  - †Toxopneustes roseus – or unidentified comparable form
- Toxostoma
  - †Toxostoma redivivum
- Trachycardium
  - †Trachycardium procerum
  - †Trachycardium schencki
  - †Trachycardium vaquerosensis
  - †Trachycardium woodringi – type locality for species
- Transennella
  - †Transennella joaquinensis – or unidentified comparable form
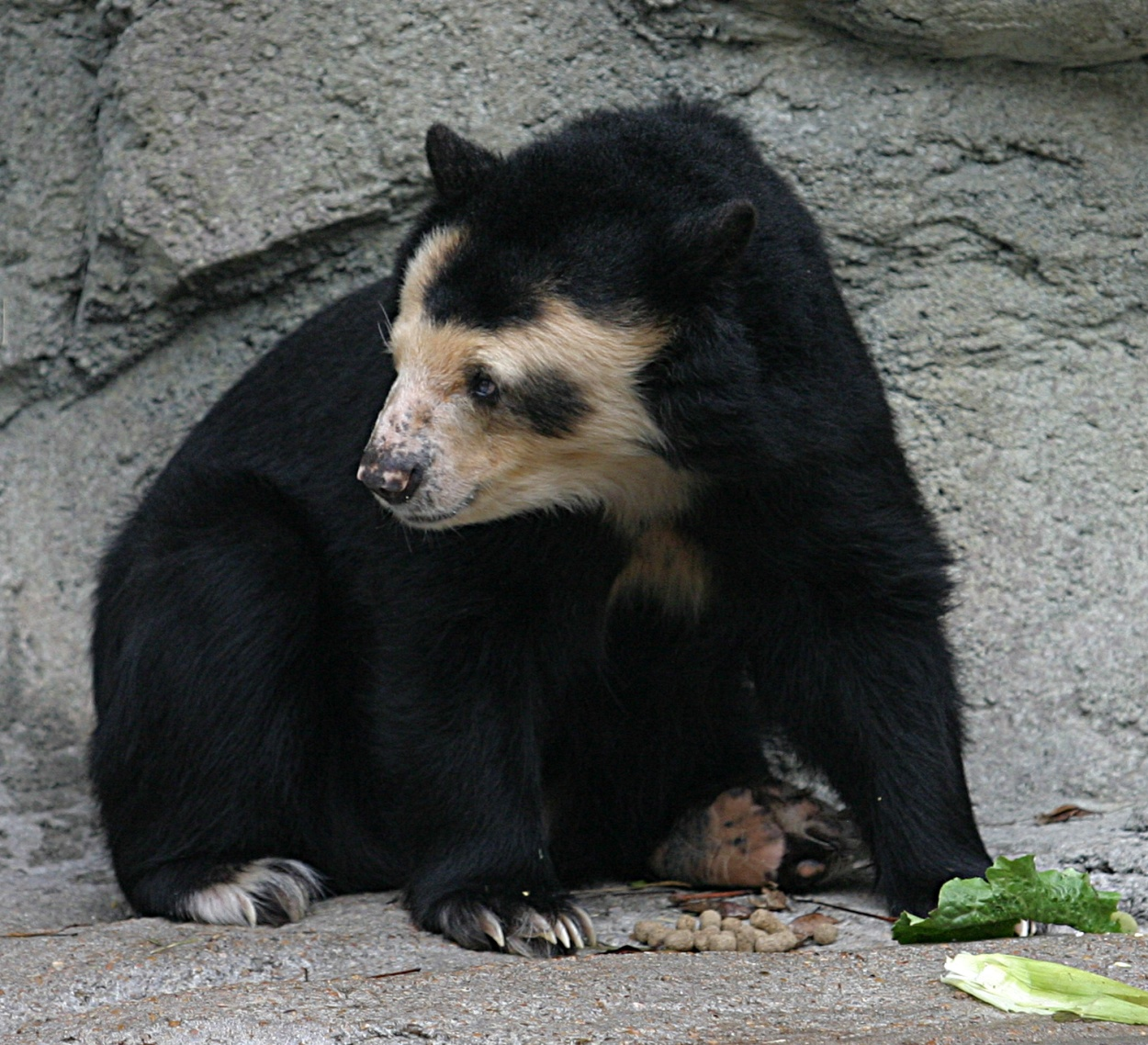
- A living Tremarctos, or spectacled bear
  Tremarctos
  - †Tremarctos floridanus
- Tresus
  - †Tresus capax
  - †Tresus nuttallii
  - †Tresus pajaroanus
- Triakis – tentative report
- Trichotropis
  - †Trichotropis cancellata
  - †Trichotropis insignis – or unidentified comparable form
- Tricolia
  - †Tricolia compta
  - †Tricolia pulloides
- †Trigonictis
  - †Trigonictis macrodon
- Trionyx
- Triphora
  - †Triphora pedroana
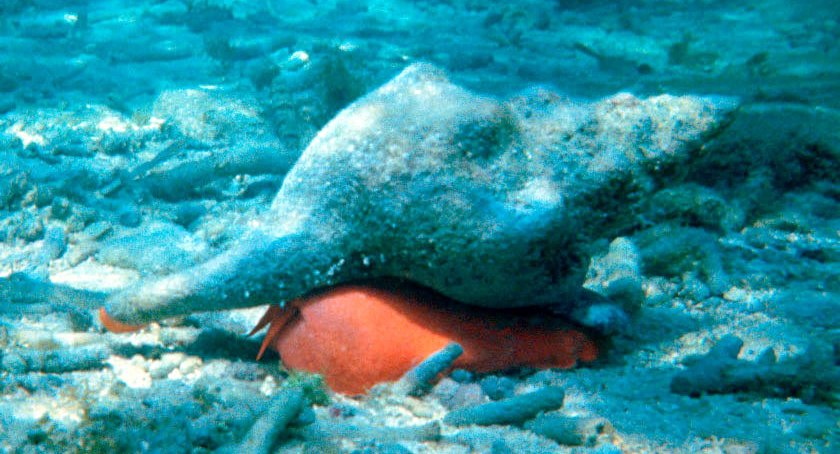
- A living Triplofusus spindle sea snail
  Triplofusus
  - †Triplofusus princeps
- †Triplopus – tentative report
  - †Triplopus woodi – type locality for species
- Trochammina
  - †Trochammina albertensis
  - †Trochammina palea – type locality for species
- Trochita
  - †Trochita filosa
- Trochocyathus
  - †Trochocyathus crooki
  - †Trochocyathus durhami – type locality for species
  - †Trochocyathus grahami – type locality for species
  - †Trochocyathus imperialis – type locality for species
  - †Trochocyathus nomlandi – type locality for species
  - †Trochocyathus stantoni – type locality for species
- †Trogomys
  - †Trogomys rupinimenthae – type locality for species
- †Trogosus
- Trophon
  - †Trophon carisaensis – or unidentified comparable form
  - †Trophon eucymata
  - †Trophon fleenerensis
  - †Trophon gillulyi
  - †Trophon hernensis – or unidentified comparable form
  - †Trophon kernensis
  - †Trophon multicostatus
  - †Trophon pacificus
- †Trossulus – tentative report
  - †Trossulus exoletus
- †Trypanotoma
  - †Trypanotoma stocki
- †Tubulodon – or unidentified comparable form
- †Tubulostium – report made of unidentified related form or using admittedly obsolete nomenclature
  - †Tubulostium tejonensis
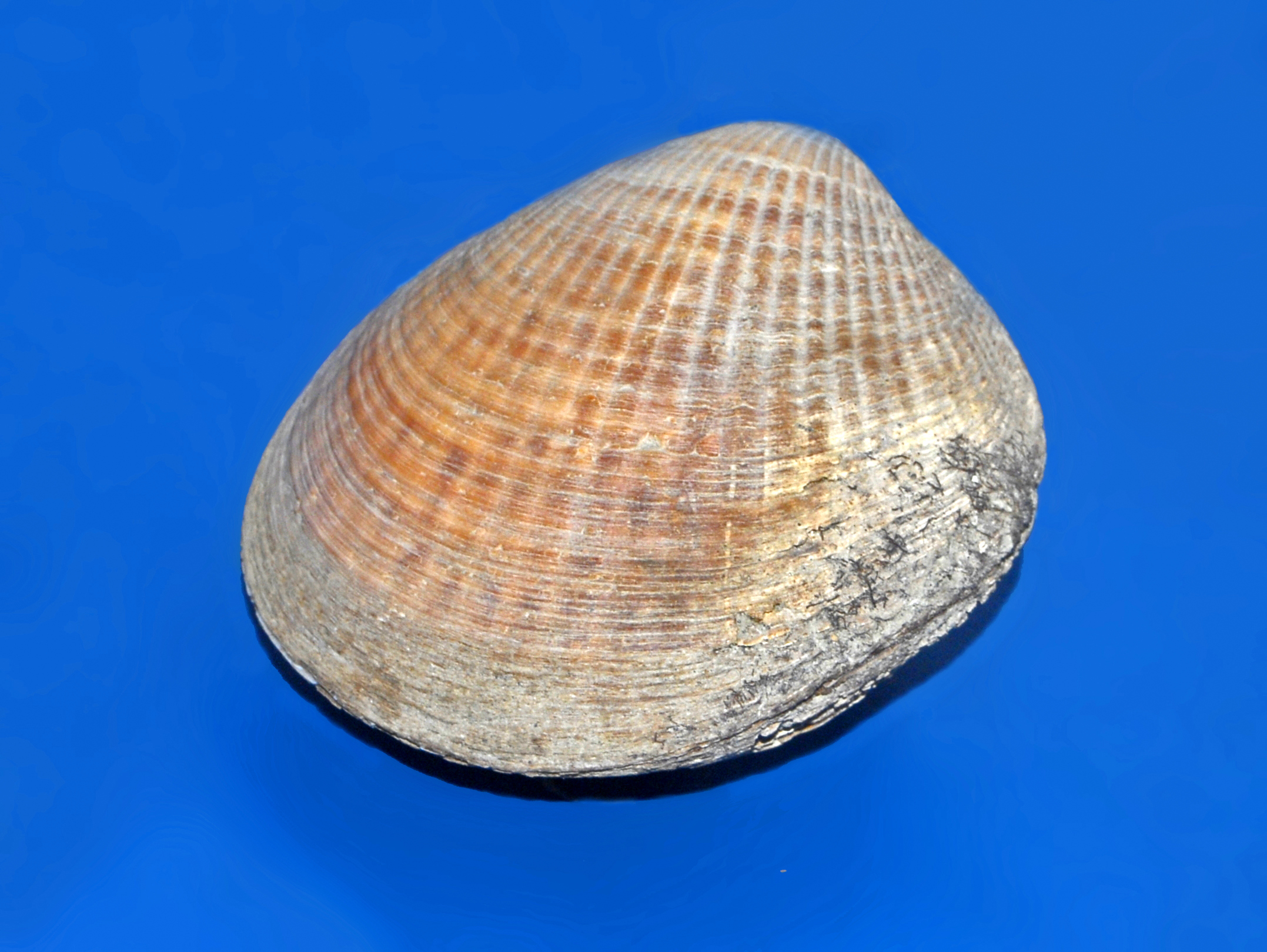
- Shell of a Tucetona bittersweet clam
  Tucetona
  - †Tucetona multicostata
- Tudicla
  - †Tudicla blakei
- †Tunita – type locality for genus
  - †Tunita octavia – type locality for species
- †Turbinolia
  - †Turbinolia capayasensis – type locality for species
  - †Turbinolia clarki – type locality for species
  - †Turbinolia dickersoni – type locality for species
  - †Turbinolia imbulata
  - †Turbinolia pusillanima – type locality for species
- Turbonilla
  - †Turbonilla aepynota
  - †Turbonilla almo
  - †Turbonilla asser
  - †Turbonilla canfieldi
  - †Turbonilla carpenteri
  - †Turbonilla keepi
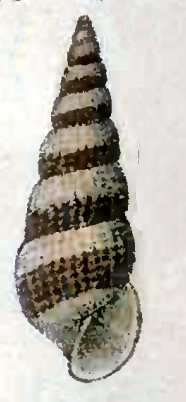
  - Illustration of the shell of a Turbonilla laminata pyram shell sea snail
    †Turbonilla laminata
  - †Turbonilla lowei
  - †Turbonilla marshensis – type locality for species
  - †Turbonilla pedroana
  - †Turbonilla pentalopha
  - †Turbonilla raymondi
  - †Turbonilla regina
  - †Turbonilla stylina
  - †Turbonilla tenuicula
  - †Turbonilla torquata
  - †Turbonilla tridentata
  - †Turbonilla weldi
- Turcica
  - †Turcica caffea
- Turdus
- †Turio
  - †Turio culveri – type locality for species
- Turricula
  - †Turricula cooperi
  - †Turricula merriami
  - †Turricula praeattenuata – or unidentified comparable form
  - †Turricula waringi
- Turris
  - †Turris fresnoensis
  - †Turris perissolaxoides
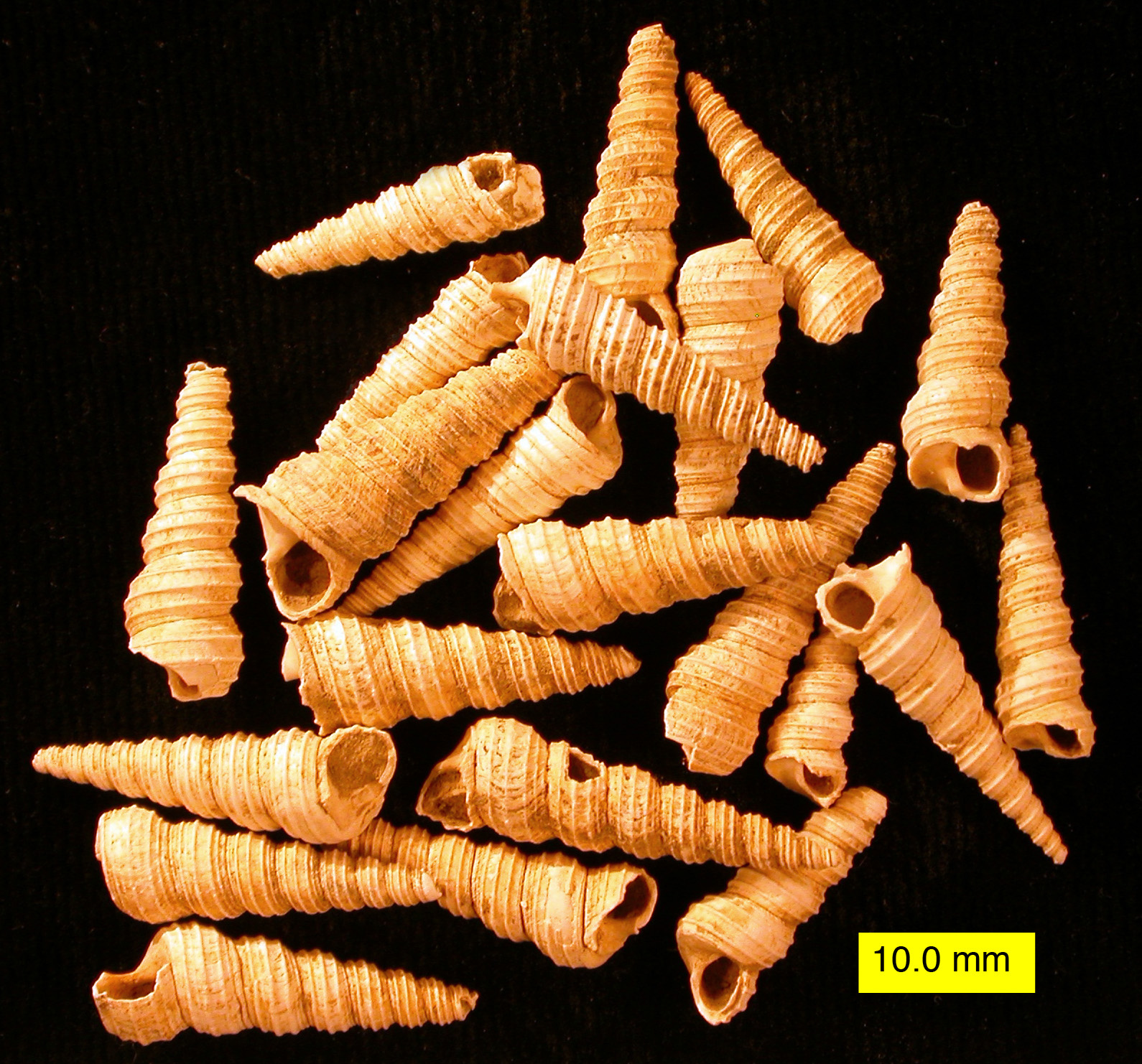
- Fossilized shells of the Late Jurassic-modern tower snail Turritella
  Turritella
  - †Turritella andersoni
  - †Turritella bosei
  - †Turritella bulwaldana
  - †Turritella buwaldana
  - †Turritella carisaensis
  - †Turritella carrisaensis
  - †Turritella cooperi
  - †Turritella hendoni
  - †Turritella imperialis – type locality for species
  - †Turritella inezana
  - †Turritella inezani
  - †Turritella infragranulata
  - †Turritella lajollaensis – or unidentified comparable form
  - †Turritella lawsoni
  - †Turritella lorenzana – type locality for species
  - †Turritella mariana
  - †Turritella meganosensis – type locality for species
  - †Turritella merriami
  - †Turritella ocoyana
  - †Turritella pachecoensis
  - †Turritella reversa
  - †Turritella stocki
  - †Turritella temblorensis
  - †Turritella uvasana
  - †Turritella variata
  - †Turritella wittichi
- Turritriton
  - †Turritriton gibbosus
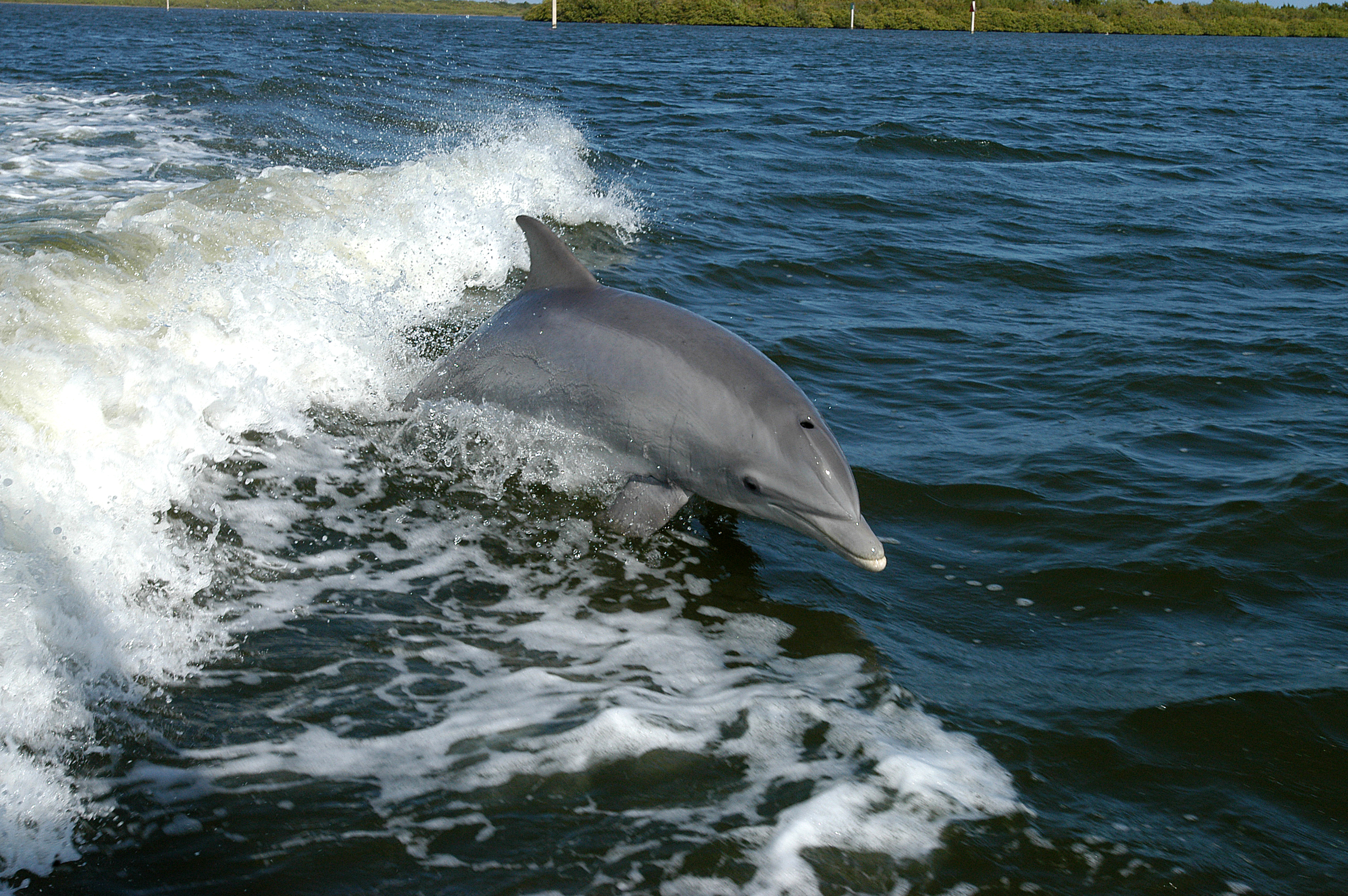
- A living Tursiops, or bottlenose dolphin
  Tursiops – or unidentified comparable form
- Typha
  - †Typha lesquereuxii
- Typhis
- Tyto
  - †Tyto alba

== U ==
- Uca
  - †Uca hamlini
- †Uintasorex
  - †Uintasorex montezumicus – type locality for species
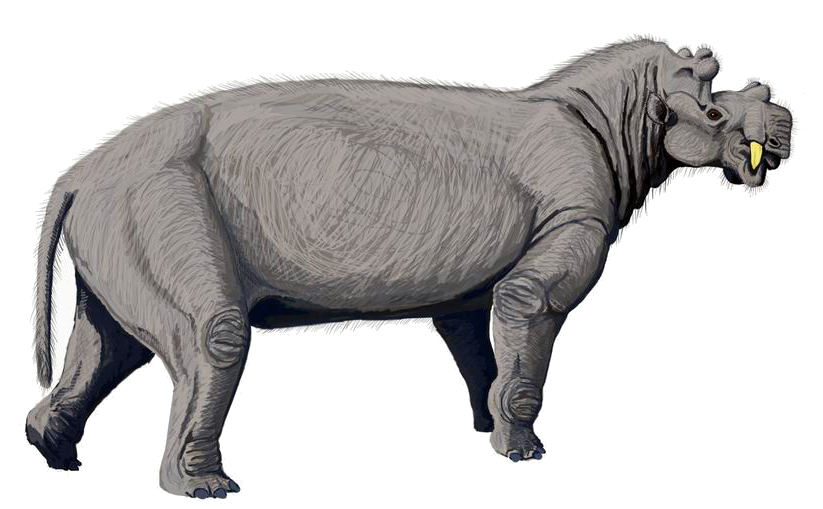
- Life restoration of the Eocene mammal Uintatherium
  †Uintatherium
- Ulmus
  - †Ulmus affinis
- †Umbellularia
  - †Umbellularia salicifolia
- †Umpquaia
- Uria
  - †Uria aalgae
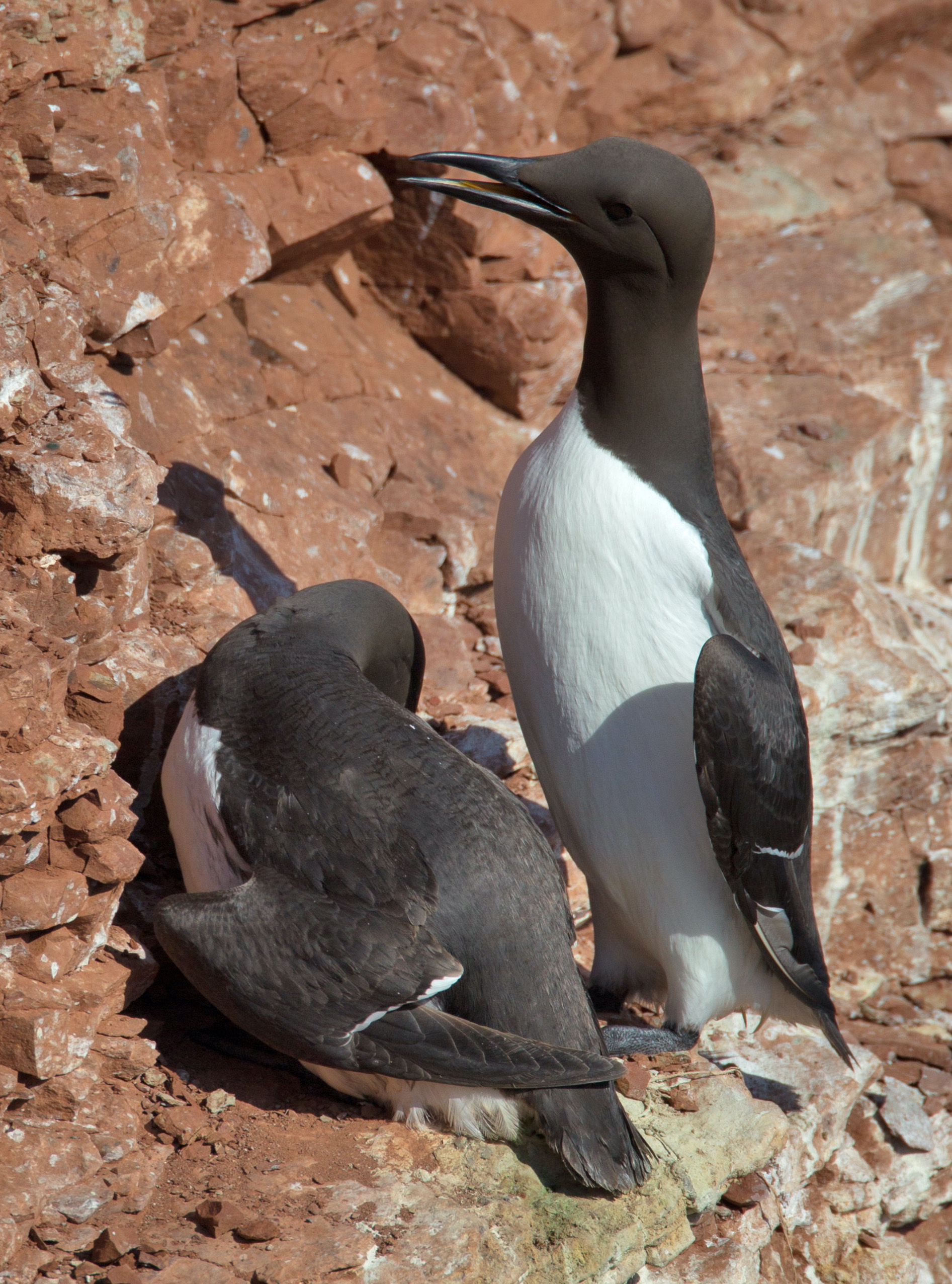
  - A pair of living Uria aalge, or common murre
    †Uria aalge
  - †Uria algae
  - †Uria brodkorbi – type locality for species
  - †Uria paleohesperis – type locality for species
- †Uriscus
  - †Uriscus californicus
- †Urobatis
  - †Urobatis halleri
- †Urocitellus
  - †Urocitellus beldingi
- Urocyon
  - †Urocyon californicus
  - †Urocyon cinereoargenteus
  - †Urocyon galushai
- Urolophus
  - †Urolophus halleri – tentative report
- Ursus
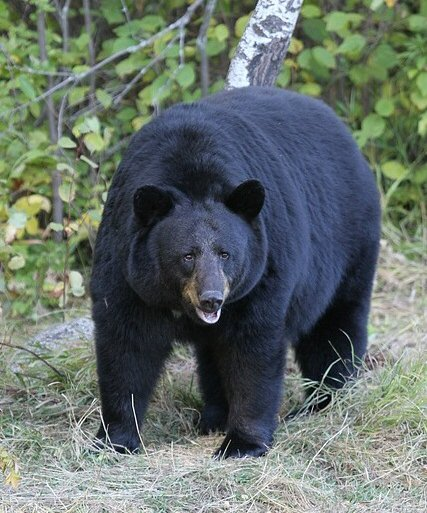
  - A living Ursus americanus, or American black bear
    †Ursus americanus
- †Ustatochoerus
  - †Ustatochoerus major
- Uta
  - †Uta stansburiana
- Uvigerina
  - †Uvigerina garzaensis
- †Uvigerinella
  - †Uvigerinella obesa

== V ==
- †Valenictus – type locality for genus
  - †Valenictus chulavistensis – type locality for species
  - †Valenictus imperialensis – type locality for species
- Valvulineria
  - †Valvulineria californica
  - †Valvulineria casitasensis
  - †Valvulineria tumeyensis
  - †Valvulineria wilcoxensis – or unidentified comparable form
- †Vanderhoofius
  - †Vanderhoofius coalingensis
- †Vaquerosella
  - †Vaquerosella andersoni
  - †Vaquerosella coreyi
  - †Vaquerosella durhami
  - †Vaquerosella fairbanksi
  - †Vaquerosella merriami
  - †Vaquerosella vaquerosensis
- Vasum
  - †Vasum caestum
- †Vauquelinia
  - †Vauquelinia exigua – type locality for species
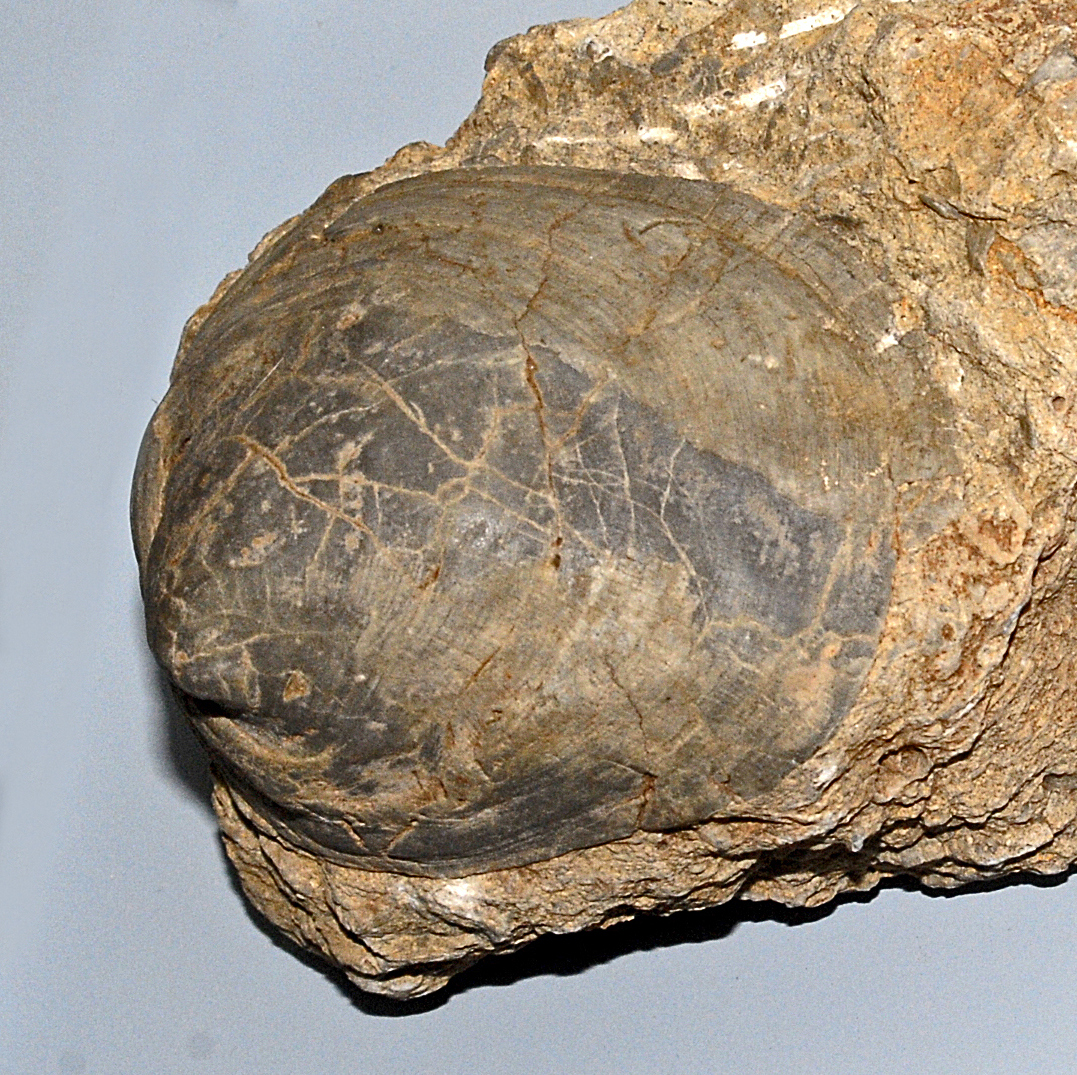
- Fossilized shell of the Paleocene-Miocene nerite sea snail Velates
  †Velates
  - †Velates californicus – type locality for species
  - †Velates perversus
- Velutina
  - †Velutina velutina
- Venericardia
  - †Venericardia hornii
  - †Venericardia mulleri
  - †Venericardia planicosta
  - †Venericardia sandiegoensis
- Venus
  - †Venus purpurissata
- Vermicularia
  - †Vermicularia ebunea
- Veromessor
  - †Veromessor andrei
- †Vertipecten
  - †Vertipecten alexclarki – type locality for species
  - †Vertipecten nevadanus
  - †Vertipecten perrini
  - †Vertipecten yneziana – or unidentified related form
- †Viburnum
  - †Viburnum variabilis
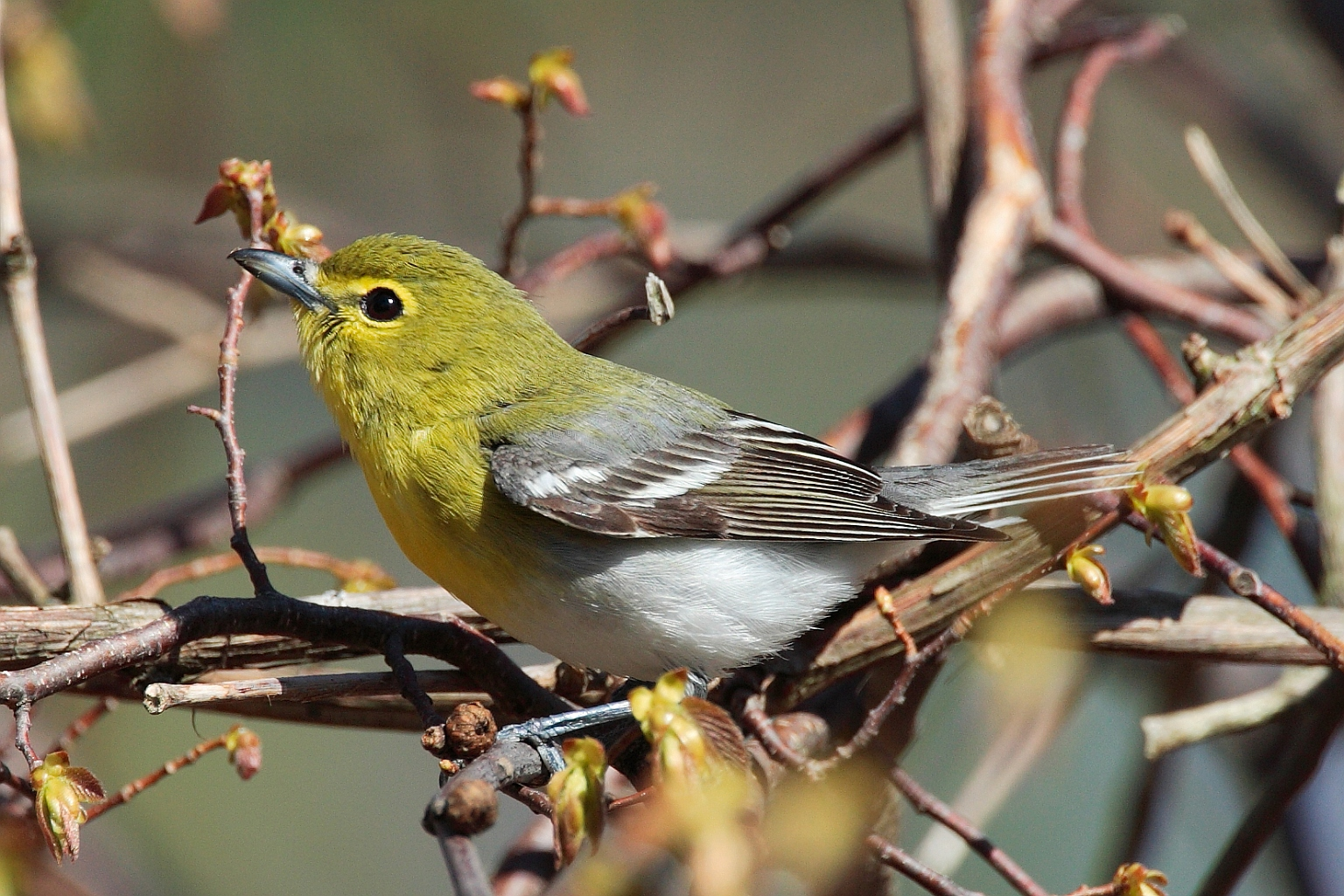
- A living Vireo
  †Vireo
- †Virgulina
  - †Virgulina bramlettei
  - †Virgulina bramlettrei
  - †Virgulina dibollensis
- Vitrinella – tentative report
- Volsella
  - †Volsella merriami
  - †Volsella porterensis – or unidentified comparable form
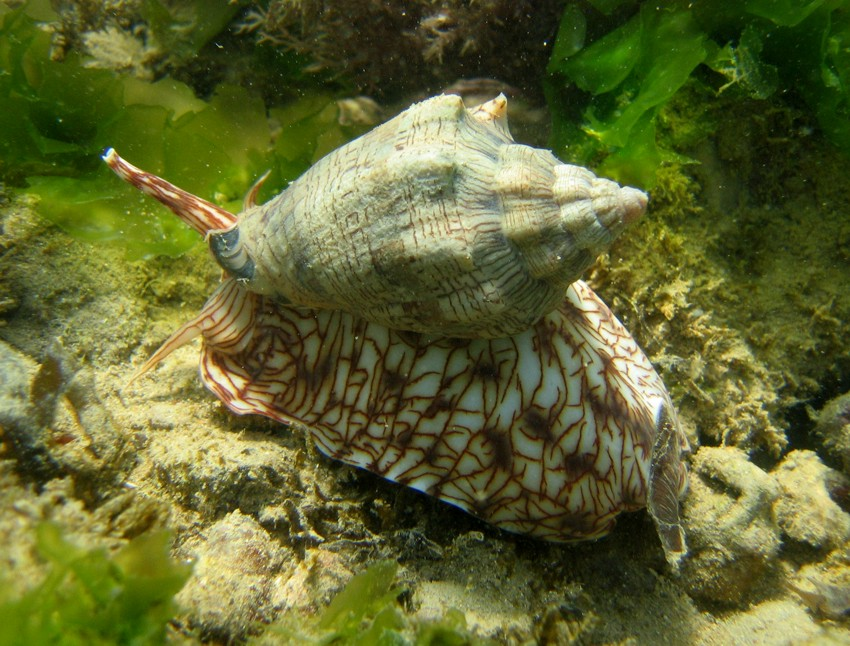
- A living Voluta sea snail
  Voluta
- †Volutilithes
  - †Volutilithes orocopiaensis – type locality for species
- Volutopsius
  - †Volutopsius eurekaensis
- Volvulella
  - †Volvulella cylindrica
- †Vouapa
  - †Vouapa geminifolia – type locality for species
- Vulpes
  - †Vulpes cascadensis
  - †Vulpes kernensis – type locality for species
  - †Vulpes stenognathus
  - †Vulpes velox
- Vulvulina
  - †Vulvulina curta

== W ==
- †Washakius
  - †Washakius woodringi – type locality for species
- †Whitneyella
  - †Whitneyella sinuata
- Williamia
  - †Williamia peltoides
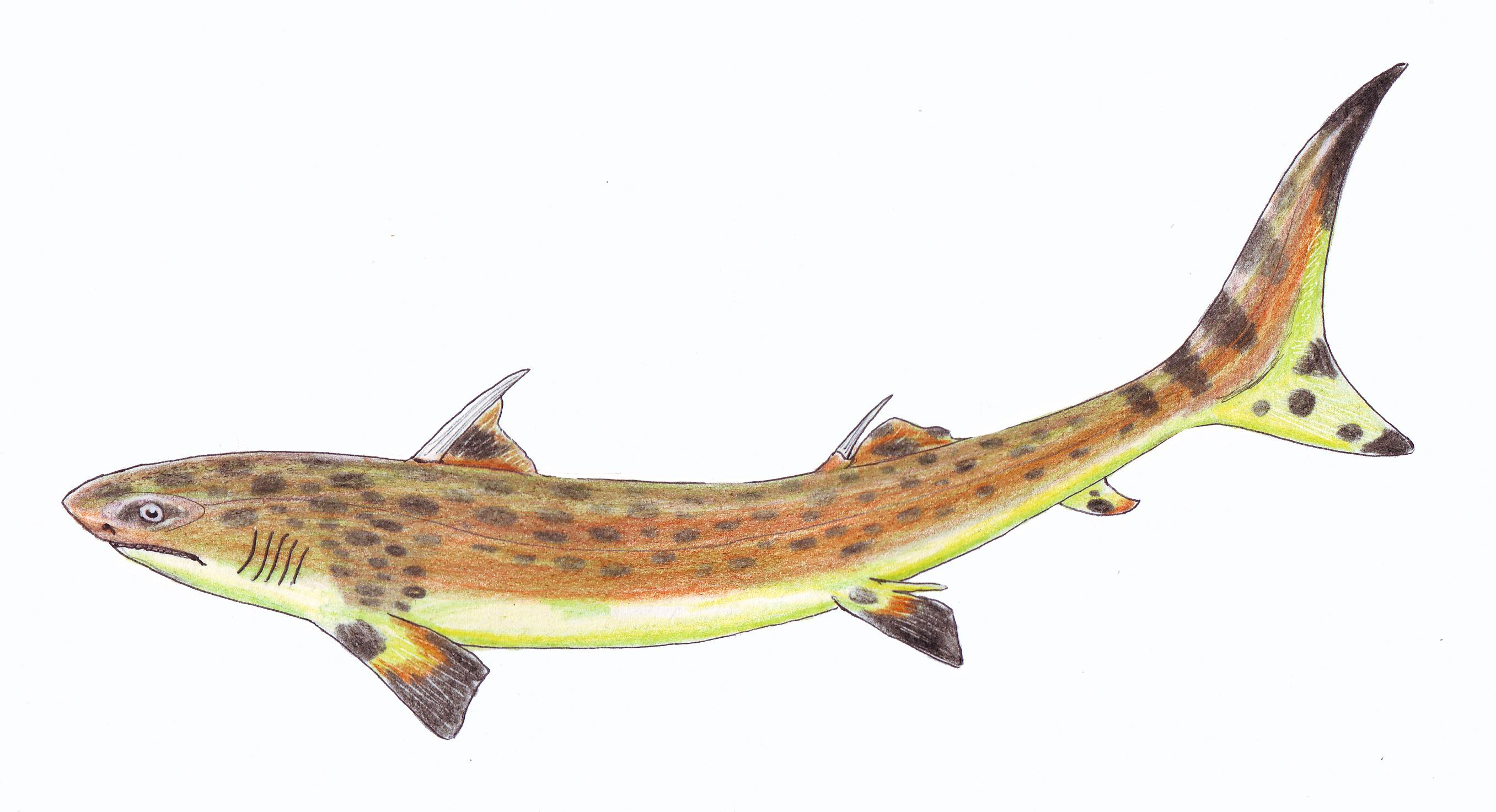
- Restoration of the Permian shark Wodnika
  †Wodnika
  - †Wodnika ocoyae – type locality for species
- †Woodburnehyus – type locality for genus
  - †Woodburnehyus grenaderae – type locality for species

== X ==
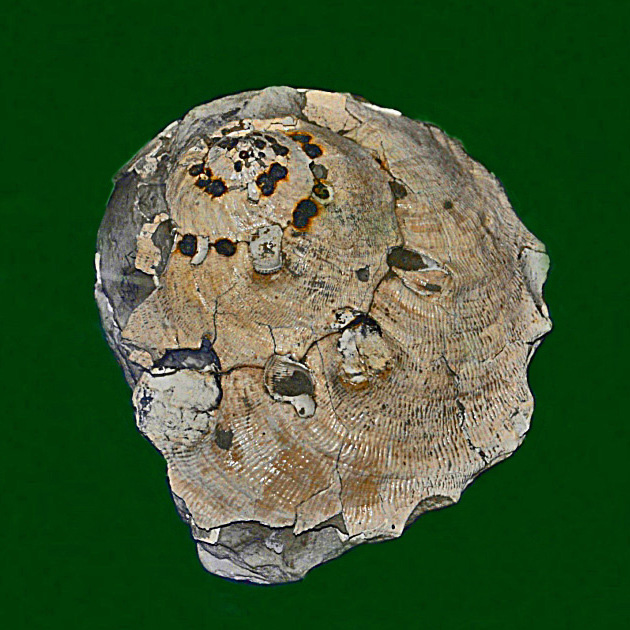
- Fossilized shell of the Late Cretaceous-modern carrier shell sea snail Xenophora
  Xenophora
  - †Xenophora stocki
  - †Xenophora zitteli
- †Xenothrissa – type locality for genus
  - †Xenothrissa aphrasta – type locality for species
- †Xyne – type locality for genus
  - †Xyne grex – type locality for species
- †Xyrinius – type locality for genus
  - †Xyrinius houshi – type locality for species

== Y ==
- †Yaquius
  - †Yaquius travisi
- †Yatkolamys
- Yoldia
  - †Yoldia cooperii
  - †Yoldia impressa
  - †Yoldia mortuasusensis – type locality for species
  - †Yoldia packardi – or unidentified comparable form
  - †Yoldia scissurata
  - †Yoldia tenuissima
- †Yumaceras – tentative report
  - †Yumaceras ruminalis – type locality for species

== Z ==
- †Zachrysia
  - †Zachrysia fraterna – type locality for species
- Zalophus
  - †Zalophus californianus
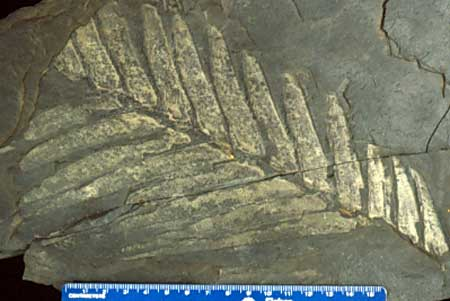
- Fossil of the Early Triassic-Eocene cycad-like frond Zamites
  †Zamites
  - †Zamites californica
- †Zanteclites – type locality for genus
  - †Zanteclites hubbsi – type locality for species
- †Zaphleges
  - †Zaphleges longurio
- †Zapteryx
  - †Zapteryx californicus – or unidentified comparable form
- †Zarhinocetus
  - †Zarhinocetus errabundus – type locality for species
- Zelkova
  - †Zelkova oregoniana
- Zenaida
  - †Zenaida macroura
- Zirfaea
  - †Zirfaea dentata – or unidentified comparable form
  - †Zirfaea pilsbryi
- Zonotrichia
  - †Zonotrichia leucophrys
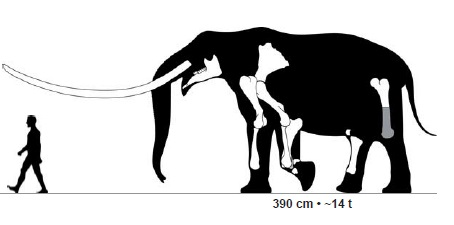
- Known material diagram depicting the Miocene-Pleistocene mastodon relative Zygolophodon with a human to scale
  †Zygolophodon
