= Modelo Formation =

Miocene geologic formation in southern California, United States

- Stratigraphic range: Late Miocene, 13–5.5 Ma
- Type: Formation
- Unit of: Los Angeles Basin
- Underlies: Pico Formation
- Overlies: Rincon Shale
- Thickness: 600 metres (2,000 ft)

Lithology
- Primary: Shale

Location
- Region: Los Angeles County and Ventura County, California
- Country: United States
- Extent: Simi Hills, Santa Susana Mountains

The Modelo Formation is a Miocene geologic formation in the Simi Hills and western Santa Susana Mountains of southern California, including under parts of Los Angeles.

It preserves fossils dating back to the Late Miocene of the Neogene period, among them a high number of fossil representatives of modern pelagic and deep-sea fish taxa (as well as some with benthic affinities), in addition to some seabirds and cetaceans. As suggested from this fauna, the sediments of the formation were likely deposited in a deepwater marine habitat at middle to upper bathyal depths within an abyssal fan, with geological changes along the San Andreas fault causing a rapid uplift during the latest Miocene, bringing these former deepwater sediments to the surface. It is likely partially contemporaneous with the Monterey Formation in some areas, such as the Ventura Basin.

Volcanic ash beds are known from the formation; these, along with fossil microorganisms, indicate that the formation was deposited between 13 and 5.5 million years ago.

== Paleobiota ==
Based on the Paleobiology Database and Fierstine et al (2012). Much of the fauna is shared with the Monterey Formation, though some distinct taxa are also known:

=== Bony fish ===
Based on Fierstine et al (2012). Many of these taxa were described by David Starr Jordan from specimens excavated during the construction of the Sepulveda Boulevard Tunnel through the Santa Monica Mountains.

Genus	Species	Location	Member	Material	Notes	Images
Absalomichthys	A. velifer			Articulated skeletons	A manefish.	
Araeosteus	A. rothi			Articulated skeletons	A relative of the prowfish.	
Argyropelecus	A. bullockii			Articulated skeletons	A marine hatchetfish.	
Bathylagus	B. angelensis			Articulated skeletons	A deep-sea smelt.	
Bolinichthys	B. sp.			Articulated skeletons	A lanternfish.	
Chalcidichthys	C. malacopterygius			Articulated skeletons	A manefish.	
Chauliodus	C. eximius			Articulated skeletons	A viperfish.	
?Clupea	?C. tiejei			Articulated skeleton	A herring, classification in Clupea uncertain.	
Cyclothone	C. solitudinis		Lower	Articulated skeleton	A bristlemouth.	
Decapterus	D. hopkinsi			Articulated skeleton	A mackerel scad.	
Decapterus	D. sp.			Articulated skeleton	A mackerel scad.	
Diaphus	D. bolini			Articulated skeletons	A lanternfish.	
Eclipes	E. santamonicae			Articulated skeletons	A cod.	
Eclipes	E. veternus			Articulated skeletons	A cod.	
Etringus	E. scintillans			Articulated skeletons, isolated scales	A herring, possibly a round herring.	
Ganolytes	G. aratus			Articulated skeletons, isolated scales	A herring.	
Ganolytes	G. cameo			Articulated skeletons, isolated scales	A herring.	
Hipposyngnathus	H. imporcitor		Upper	Articulated skeletons	A pipefish.	
Plectrites	P. classeni			Articulated skeletons	A seabream.	
Quaesita	Q. quisquilia			Articulated skeletons	A deep-sea smelt.	
Lampanyctus	L. petrolifer			Articulated skeletons	A lanternfish, L. petrolifer potentially in an undescribed genus.	
Lampanyctus	L. sp.			Articulated skeletons	A lanternfish, L. petrolifer potentially in an undescribed genus.	
Laytonia	L. californica			Articulated skeleton	A halosaur.	
Lompoquia	L. culveri			Articulated skeleton	A drumfish.	
Lompoquia	L. retropes			Articulated skeleton	A drumfish.	
Lompoquia	L. sp.			Articulated skeleton	A drumfish.	
Molidae indet.					An ocean sunfish.	
Myctophum	M. sp.			Articulated skeletons	A lanternfish.	
Pseudoseriola	P. gilliandi			Articulated skeletons	A relative of the bluefish.	
Pseudoseriola	P. sp.			Articulated skeletons	A relative of the bluefish.	
Rhomurus	R. fulcratus			Partial skeleton	A halfbeak, either in the Hemiramphidae or the extinct Forficidae.	
Sarda	S. stockii			Partial skeletons	A bonito.	
Scomber	S. sanctaemonicae			Partial skeleton	A true mackerel.	
Scomber	S. cf. japonicus (=Pneumatophorus cf. grex)			Scale	A true mackerel.	
Scomber	S. sp.	Mulholland Drive		Partial skeletons	A true mackerel.	
Scomberesox	S. edwardsi		Lower	Skull, partial segment with scales	A saury.	
Scorpaena	S. ensiger			Articulated skeletons	A scorpionfish.	
Sebastes	S. davidi			Articulated skeletons	A rockfish.	
Sebastes	S. sp.			Articulated skeletons	A rockfish.	
Syngnathus	S. avus			Articulated skeletons	A pipefish.	
Thyrsocles	T. kriegeri			Articulated skeletons	A euzaphlegid.	
Xyne	X. grex			Articulated skeletons, isolated scales	A herring.	
Zanteclites	Z. sp.			Isolated scales	A Neotropical silverside.	
Zaphlegulus	Z. venturaensis				A euzaphlegid.	

=== Birds ===
Based on the Paleobiology Database:

Genus	Species	Location	Member	Material	Notes	Images
Osteodontornis	O. orri	Sherman Oaks			A pseudotooth bird.	
Phalacrocorax	P. femoralis				A cormorant.	
Puffinus	P. diatomicus	Sherman Oaks		Incomplete skeleton.	A shearwater.	
Sula	S. willetti	Sherman Oaks		Leg bones.	A booby.	

=== Mammals ===
Based on the Paleobiology Database:

Genus	Species	Location	Member	Material	Notes	Images
Atocetus	A. nasalis		Upper		A kentriodontid toothed whale.	
Mixocetus	M. elysius	Lincoln Heights	Elysian Park Sandstone	Skull	A tranatocetid baleen whale, for which the formation is the type locality.	

== See also ==
- List of fossiliferous stratigraphic units in California
- Paleontology in California
