= Puente Formation =

Geologic formation in California, United States

- Stratigraphic range: Tortonian
- Type: Geological formation
- Unit of: Los Angeles Basin
- Sub-units: (ascending) La Vida, Soquel, Yorba, Sycamore Canyon
- Underlies: Fernando Formation; Repetto Formation
- Overlies: El Modeno Volcanics; Topanga Canyon Formation; Vaqueros Formation; Sespe Formation
- Thickness: About 3900 meters

Lithology
- Primary: Sandstone, conglomerate & mudrock

Location
- Region: California
- Country: United States

Type section
- Named for: Puente Hills

The Puente Formation is a geologic formation in California. It preserves fossils dating back to the middle to upper Miocene epoch of the Neogene period, most of which were deposited in a deepwater environment. Owing to its depositional environment, it is one of the very few geologic formations to preserve articulated specimens of fossilized deep-sea anglerfish.

Stratigraphy of the Los Angeles Basin incl. Puente Formation

As its name suggests, it primarily outcrops in the Puente Hills.

== Paleoecology ==
The Yorba Member of the Puente Formation preserves some of the world's only known fossils of deep-sea anglerfish, most of which were discovered during the construction of a rail line. These anglerfish are assigned to several genera and species that inhabit hypoxic, upwelling-influenced subtropical and tropical environments in the eastern Pacific today, suggesting that the composition of these ecological communities has changed little in the time since the deposition of this formation. These taxa are not found off the coast of California today, suggesting that the region was much warmer and more tropical during the late Miocene. The minimum depth of this depositional environment would have been about 1,000 metres (3,300 ft) deep.

== Paleobiota ==
=== Ray-finned fish ===
Based on Fierstine et al (2012):

Genus	Species	Location	Member	Material	Notes	Images
Acentrophryne	A. sp.	City of Industry, Pomona Freeway Chalk Hill	Yorba	Articulated skeleton	An leftvent deep-sea anglerfish.	
Acipenseridae indet.				Subopercule	A sturgeon of uncertain affinities.	
Argentina	A. sp.	Pomona Freeway Chalk Hill		"Remains"	A herring smelt.	
Argyropelecus	A. sp.	Pomona Freeway Chalk Hill		Unknown	A marine hatchetfish.	
Atherinops	A. sp.	Pomona Freeway Chalk Hill		Unknown	A Neotropical silverside related to the modern topsmelt silverside.	
Atherinopsis	A. sp.	Pomona Freeway Chalk Hill		Unknown	A Neotropical silverside related to the modern jack silverside.	
Bathylaginae indet.		Pomona Freeway Chalk Hill		Unknown	A deep-sea smelt.	
Borophryne	B. cf. apogon	LACM Locality 6202	Yorba	Complete articulated skeleton	A leftvent deep-sea anglerfish, potentially referable to the modern netdevil.	
Chaenophryne	C. aff. melanorhabdus	LACM Locality 6202	Yorba	4 complete articulated skeletons	An oneirodid deep-sea anglerfish, potential affinities to the modern smooth dreamer.	
Chauliodus	C. eximius	Pomona Freeway Chalk Hill		Unknown	A viperfish.	
Cyclothone	C. sp.	Pomona Freeway Chalk Hill		Unknown	A bristlemouth.	
Decapterus	D. cf. hopkinsi	Continental Oil Company “Turnbull” well number 3	Lower	One scale; lost	A scad.	
Decapterus	D. sp.	Pomona Freeway Chalk Hill		Unknown	A scad.	
Etringus	E. scintillans	Puente Hills		Two scales; lost	A herring.	
Ganoessus	G. clepsydra	Featherstone Quarry		Unknown	A herring.	
Ganoessus	G. meiklejohni	Featherstone Quarry		Articulated skeleton	A herring.	
Ganolytes	G. cameo	Pomona Freeway Chalk Hill		Unknown	A herring.	
Genyonemus	G. whistleri	Pomona Freeway Chalk Hill		Partial articulated specimen.	A drumfish related to the white croaker.	
Lampanyctus	L. sp.	Pomona Freeway Chalk Hill		">100 otoliths and several skeletal imprints with otoliths"	A lanternfish.	
Leptacanthichthys	L. cf. gracilispinis	LACM Locality 6202	Yorba	Articulated skeleton	An oneirodid deep-sea anglerfish, potentially referable to the modern plainchin dreamarm.	
Linophryne	L. cf. indica	LACM Locality 6202	Yorba	Articulated skeleton	A leftvent deep-sea anglerfish, potentially referable to the modern headlight angler.	
Lompoquia	L. sp.		Upper	Unknown	A drumfish.	
Molidae indet.					An ocean sunfish of uncertain affinities.	
Moridae indet.		Pomona Freeway Chalk Hill		Unknown	A codling of uncertain affinities.	
Oneirodes	O. sp.	LACM Locality 6202	Yorba	Articulated incomplete skeleton	An oneirodid deep-sea anglerfish.	
Paralabrax	P. sp.	Pomona Freeway Chalk Hill		Unknown	A sand bass.	
Pseudoseriola	P. gilliandi				A relative of the bluefish.	
Sarda	S. stockii	Union Oil Company “Chapman” well number 29	Lower	2 scales	A bonito.	
Scomber	S. cf. japonicus	Continental Oil Company “Turnbull” well number 3	Lower	1 scale, lost	A mackerel, potentially referable to the modern chub mackerel.	
Scomber	S. sp.	Pomona Freeway Chalk Hill		Unknown	A mackerel.	
Seriphus	S. lavenbergi	City of Industry	Yorba	Disarticulated skull with otolith	A drumfish related to the queenfish.	
Symphurus	S. sp.	Santiago Road Overcrossing	La Vida	6 partial skeletons	A tonguefish.	
Syngnathus	S. emeritus	San Dimas		Several articulated skeletons	A pipefish.	
Thyrsocles	T. kriegeri	Pomona Freeway Chalk Hill		Unknown	A euzaphlegid.	
Xyne	X. grex	Pomona Freeway Chalk Hill		Unknown	A herring.	
?Xyrinius	X. houshi	"Los Angeles"		Unknown	A herring, from either the Monterey or Puente Formations. Potentially conspecific with Xyne grex.	
Zanteclites	Z. hubbsi	Covina, El Modena		6 specimens	A Neotropical silverside.	

== See also ==
- List of fossiliferous stratigraphic units in California
- Paleontology in California
- La Vida Mineral Springs
