= Clupeoidei =

Clupeoidei Temporal range: Late Barremian to present, 122–0 Ma
- Atlantic herring, (Clupea harengus)

Scientific classification
- Kingdom: Animalia
- Phylum: Chordata
- Class: Actinopterygii
- Division: Teleostei
- Order: Clupeiformes
- Suborder: Clupeoidei; Bleeker, 1849

Families
- See text

Suborder of fishes

Clupeoidei is a suborder of marine and freshwater ray-finned fishes belonging to the order Clupeiformes, an order which includes the herrings, anchovies and shads.

== Classification ==
The Clupeoidei has the following families classified within it:

Suborder Clupeoidei

- Superfamily Engrauloidea Nelson, 1970
  - Family Spratelloididae D. S. Jordan 1925 (dwarf herrings or small round herrings)
  - Family Dussumieriidae Gill, 1861 (round herrings or rainbow sardines)
  - Family Chirocentridae Bleeker, 1849 (wolf herrings)
  - Family Engraulidae Gill, 1861 (anchovies)
    - Subfamily Coiliinae Bleeker, 1872 (Old World anchovies)
    - Subfamily Engraulinae Gill, 1861 (anchovies)
- Superfamily Pristigasteroidea Nelson, 1970
  - Family Pristigasteridae Bleeker, 1872 (longfin herrings)
- Superfamily Clupeoidea Cuvier, 1816
  - Family Clupeidae Cuvier, 1816 (herrings and sprats)
  - Family Hyperlophidae Ogilby, 1897 (double-armored freshwater herrings)
  - Family Ehiravidae Deraniyagala, 1929 (river sprats)
    - Subfamily Ehiravinae Deraniyagala, 1929 (Indian freshwater herrings)
    - Subfamily Pellonulinae Svetovidov, 1952 (African freshwater herrings)
  - Family Alosidae Svetovidov, 1952 (shads and sardines)
  - Family Dorosomatidae Gill, 1861 (thread herrings or gizzard shads and sardinellas)

=== Fossil taxa ===
The following extinct taxa are also known:

- Genus †Leufuichthys Gallo, Calvo & Kellner, 2011
- Genus †Nolfia de Figueiredo, 2009
- Genus †Pseudoellima de Figueiredo, 2009
- Superfamily Engrauloidea Nelson, 1970
  - Genus †Nardoclupea Taverne, 2002
  - Family †Clupeopsidae Marramà & Carnevale, 2026
    - Genus †Clupeopsis Casier, 1946
    - Genus †Monosmilus Capobianco et al., 2020

The following fossil genera have not been assigned to a particular taxonomic placement within the Clupeoidei yet:

- †Alisea Jordan & Gilbert, 1919
- ?†Audenaerdia Taverne, 1973 (alternatively Clupeidae or Alosidae)
- †Austroclupea Bardack, 1961
- †Clupeidarum [otolith]
- †Clupeops
- †Eosardinella
- †Etringus Jordan, 1907
- †Ganoessus Jordan, 1920
- †Ganolytes Jordan, 1919
- †Horaclupea Borkar, 1973
- †?Hypsospondylus
- †Italoclupea Taverne, 2007
- †Karaganops
- †Lecceclupea Taverne, 2011
- †Marambionella
- †Maicopiella
- †Paleopiquitinga
- †Primisardinella
- †Pseudohilsa
- †Quisque Jordan, 1920
- †Rupelia
- †Sarmatella (=†Illusionella)
- †Vectichthys
- †Waihaoclupea
- †Wisslerius
- †Xenophanis
- †Xyne Jordan, 1921
- †Xyrinius
