= Repetto Hills =

Hills in California, United States

Coordinates: 34.075°N 118.175°W

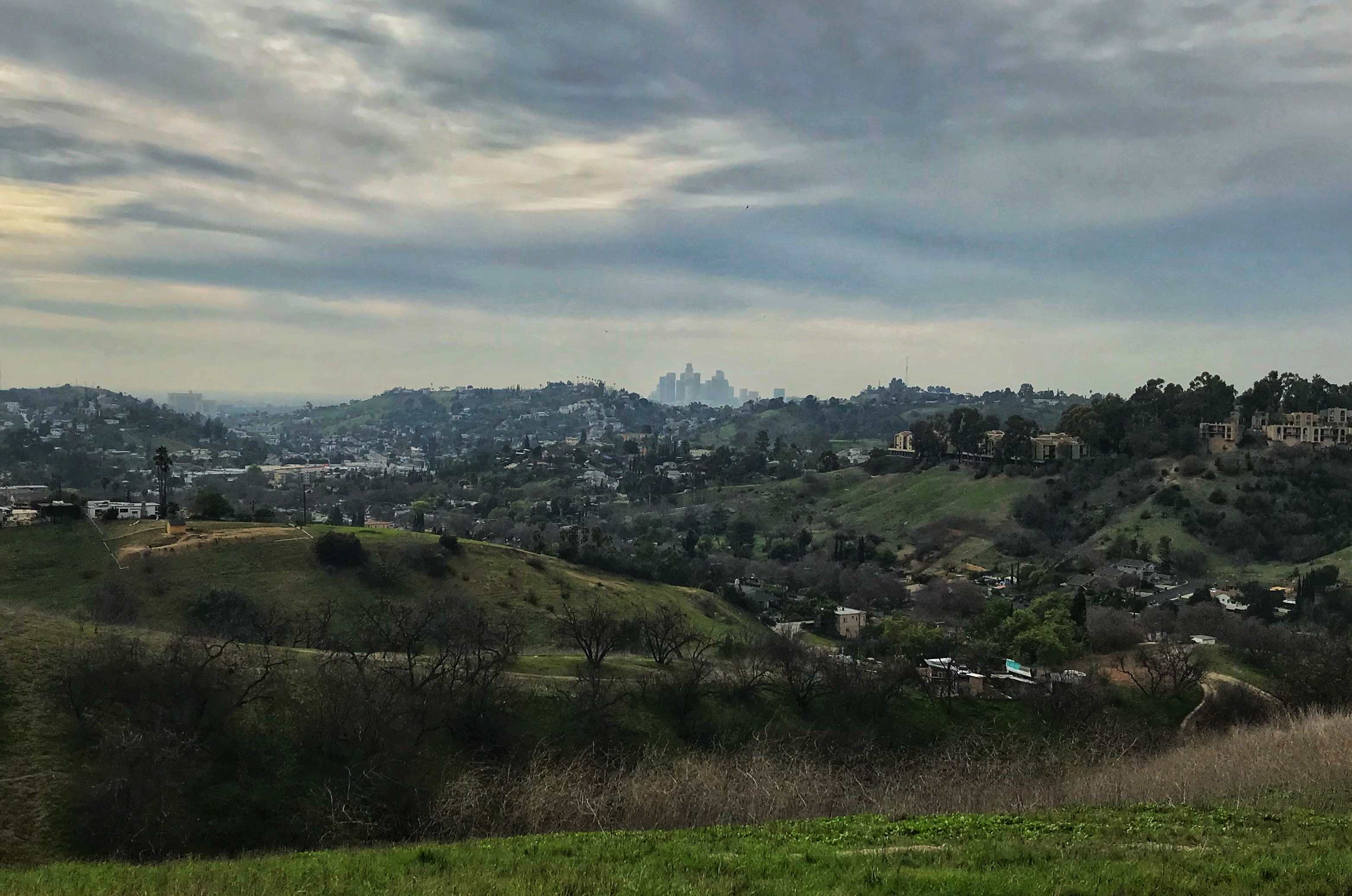
View across part of the Repetto Hills from Elephant Hill Open Space in 2022, with the Downtown Los Angeles skyline in the distance

The Repetto Hills are a chain of low hills in Los Angeles County, California that form the southwestern boundary of the San Gabriel Valley, separating it from the Los Angeles Basin. They are mainly within the cities of Los Angeles, Monterey Park, and Montebello and are densely populated. The hills are named for Alessandro Repetto, a 19th-century landowner in the area, and the Repetto Formation is named after the hills.

== Geography ==
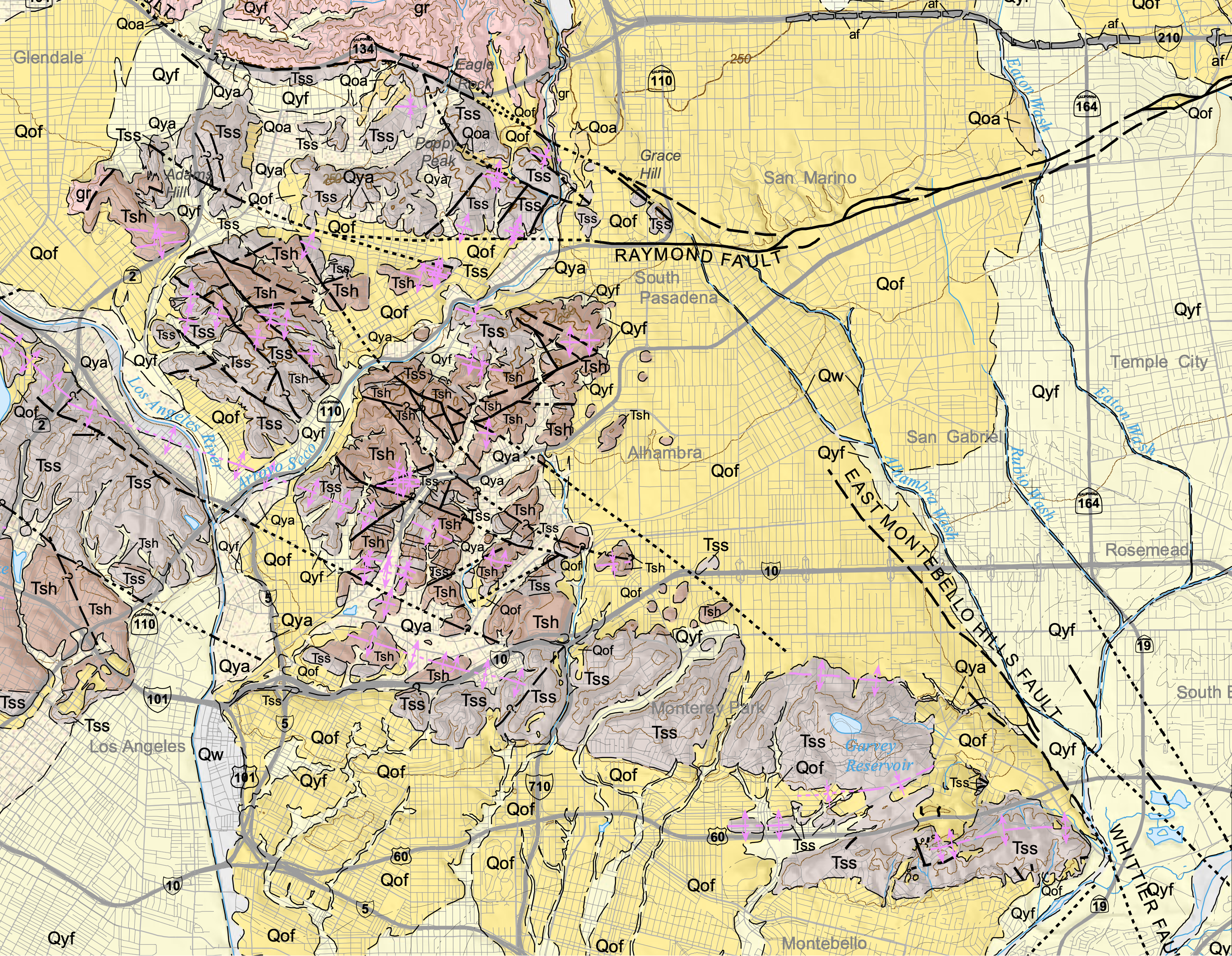
Surface geology of the Repetto Hills. Gray and brown areas are the older Tertiary outcroppings of the hills, while yellow areas are younger Quaternary deposits of the surrounding plains. Part of the geologically similar Elysian Hills is at left, and the edge of the distinct San Rafael Hills (in pink) is at the top.

The Repetto Hills separate the San Gabriel Valley to the northeast from the Los Angeles Basin to the south. They also form a barrier between the groundwater basins of each area.

From west to east, the Repetto Hills include Mount Washington, several unnamed hills in Eastside and Northeast Los Angeles, the Monterey Park Hills, and the Montebello or Merced Hills. The Repetto Hills are bounded to the west by the Glendale Narrows section of the Los Angeles River, across which lies the Elysian Hills; and to the east by the Whittier Narrows, across which lies the Puente Hills. To the Repetto Hills' northwest are the San Rafael Hills.

The Repetto Hills are within the transition zone between the Peninsular and Transverse Ranges. The elevations range from around 870 feet (270 m) in Montecito Heights to 200 feet (61 m) at their eastern end at Rosemead Boulevard. The hills are separated by dry valleys that had active drainage during the wetter Pleistocene ice ages over 20,000 years ago. The hills are densely populated.

The hills were formed by uplift and detachment folding due to blind thrust faults in the Quaternary period as part of the Elysian Park Fold and Thrust Belt. The region features outcroppings of the sedimentary Tertiary-period Fernando Formation, Puente Formation, and Topanga Formation, which contrast with the surrounding Quaternary-period alluvial deposits. The Repetto Formation, which is part of the Fernando Formation, is named after the hills. These formations are distinguishable from the plutonic igneous rock of the San Rafael Hills, which are separated by the Eagle Rock Fault.

== History ==
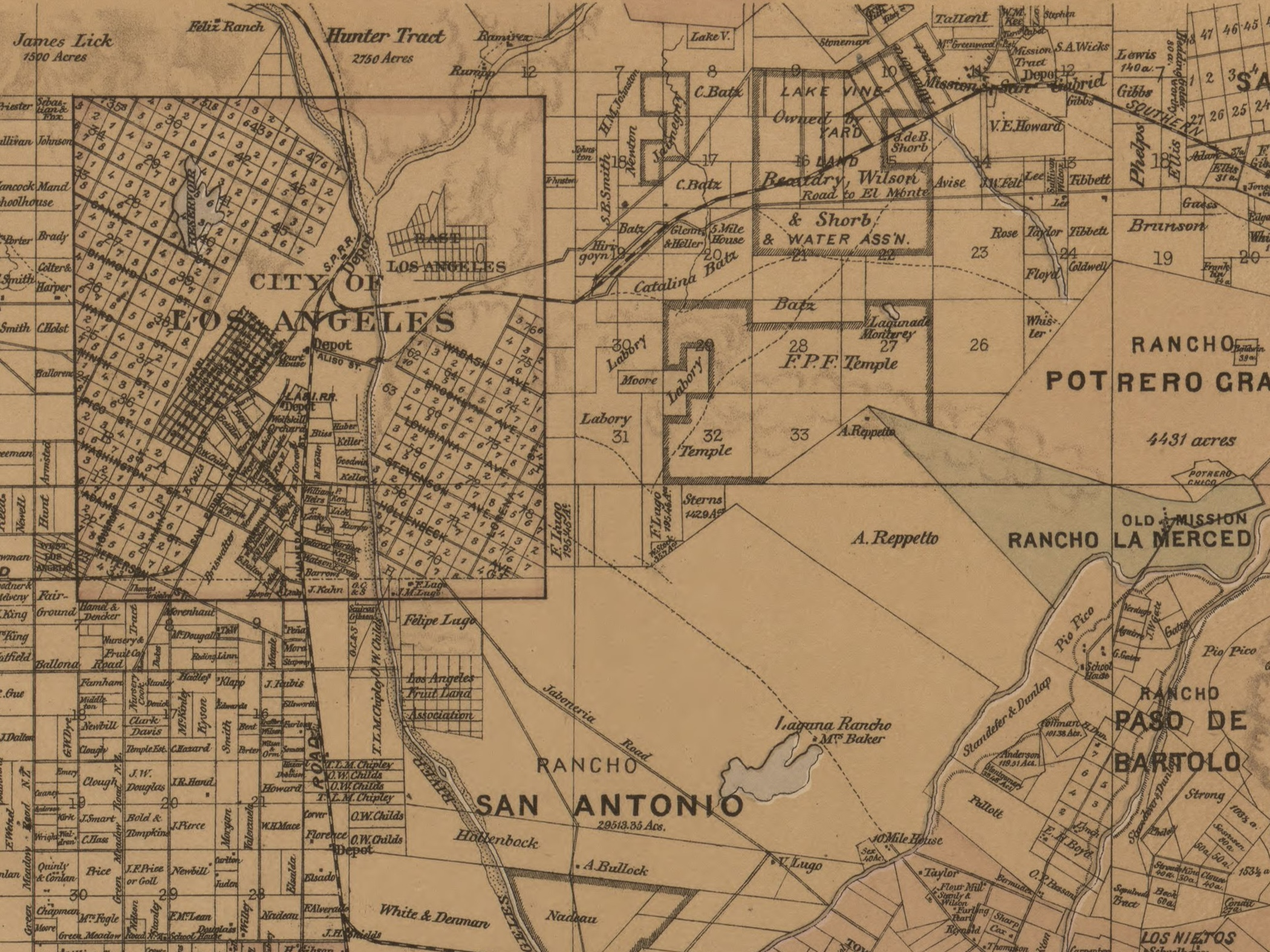
Detail of an 1877 map showing the City of Los Angeles and Alessandro Repetto's house and estate (left of Rancho La Merced)

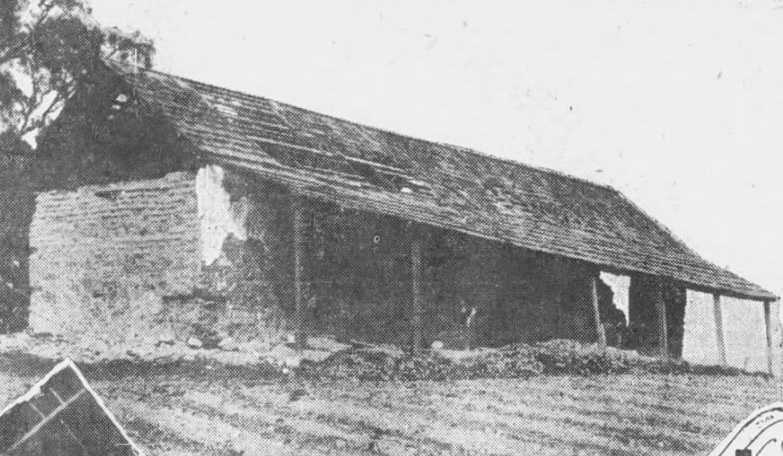
The adobe built by Jose del Carmen Lugo in 1840 and occupied by Repetto, shortly before its collapse in 1927

The hills are named for Alessandro Repetto, an Italian immigrant and army doctor from Genoa who acquired 5,000 acres of land in and near the hills in 1866. The land was previously owned by the Lugo family as part of Rancho San Antonio, and contained an adobe house in the hills built in 1840 by Jose del Carmen Lugo.

In 1874, the bandit Tiburcio Vásquez raided the house, stealing two bags of gold and silver, and tying Repetto to a tree and forcing his nephew to withdraw additional money from a bank as ransom. Although Vásquez escaped, he was soon captured and was executed the following year. The incident gave rise to a legend that he had buried loot at the property, making it a destination for treasure hunters.

Repetto's property was purchased by Montebello founder Harris Newmark in the 1880s, and around 1900 it was subdivided for a residential development. In 1912, the adobe was still in fair condition and was purchased by the cities of Alhambra, Pasadena, and South Pasadena, and the Native Sons of the Golden West advocated for preserving it. However, it became dilapidated and collapsed in 1927 due to a heavy rain and the effects of digging by treasure hunters.

Oil exploration in the Repetto Hills began as early as 1896. Oil was discovered there by Standard Oil in 1917. The hills were the site of an unexpected and unusual gusher from a new oil well in 1926.
