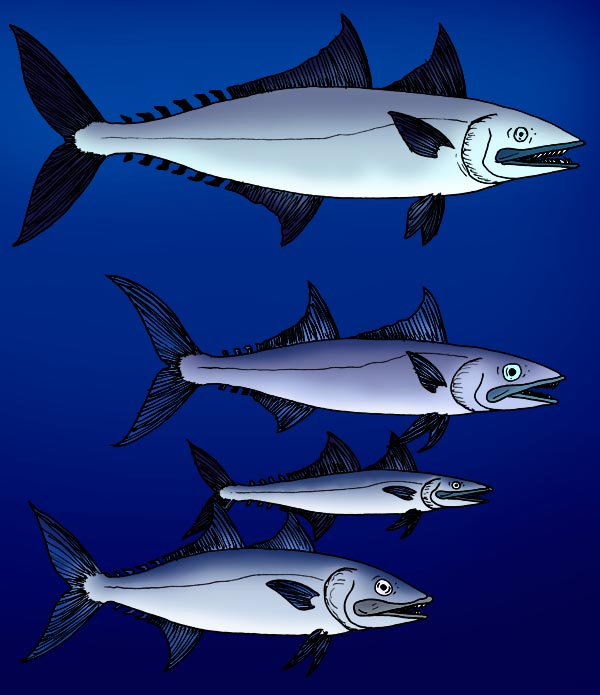
- Life restoration of the Miocene euzaphlegids from California

Scientific classification
- Kingdom: Animalia
- Phylum: Chordata
- Class: Actinopterygii
- Division: Teleostei
- Order: Scombriformes
- Suborder: Scombroidei
- Family: †Euzaphlegidae; Daniltshenko, 1960

Type genus
- †Euzaphleges White & Moy-Thomas, 1941

Subfamilies and Genera
- Acanthophleges; Veronaphleges; Dipterichthyinae; Palimphyes; Euzaphleginae; Euzaphleges (type genus); Zaphlegulus; Thyrsocles; ?Trossulus

= Euzaphlegidae =

Euzaphlegidae Temporal range: Earliest Eocene to Late Miocene

Extinct family of ray-finned fishes

Euzaphlegidae is a family of extinct escolar-like ray-finned fish closely related to the snake mackerels. Fossils of euzaphlegids are found from earliest Eocene to Late Miocene-aged marine strata of Europe, the Caucasus Mountains, India, Iran, Turkmenistan, Italy, and Southern California.

== Description and taxonomy ==
In life, the Euzaphlegidae would have borne a superficial resemblance to mackerels or wahoo, leading some researchers to initially place them within the Scombridae or Cybiidae, respectively. However, X-ray analysis of the bone structure strongly suggests a relationship with the snake-mackerels, leading to their current placement within or near the Gempylidae.

== Ecology and anatomy ==
The sharp teeth and mackerel-like forms strongly suggest that the euzaphlegids were predators, verified by the remains of numerous extinct deep sea smelt, Bathylagus, and herring, Xyne grex, found within the stomachs of several specimens of Thyrsocles and Euzaphleges. Researcher Lore Rose David proposed that, because the Euzaphlegidae were comparatively less adapted to a pelagic lifestyle like the gempylids, but had slender skeletons suggesting of a deep-water lifestyle, the Euzaphlegidae lived in deep, offshore communities near the ocean floor, where they preyed on other fish. David also suggested that the Euzaphlegidae presence in Miocene California excluded the gempylids from establishing themselves there at the time, while the presence of scombrids in shallower water ecosystems prevented the Euzaphlegidae from establishing themselves in shallow water.

== Taxonomy ==
Originally, the family Euzaphlegidae (synonym=Zaphlegidae) originally described containing only the three to four genera from Late Miocene Southern California strata. Later, the genus Palimphyes, whose 10 species are found in Paleogene Tethys and Paratethys strata from the Swiss Alps, the Carpathians, Caucasus, Iran, India and Turkmenistan, was placed within Euzaphlegidae as the subfamily Dipterichthyinae (named after a junior synonym, Dipterichthys). Recently, a new genus, Veronaphleges, was found and described from Monte Bolca, representing one of the very few mesopelagic fish known from that lagerstätte. Veronaphleges apparently is a basal form that can not be grouped in either subfamily.

== Evolution ==
The family originated in the eastern Tethys during the late Paleocene or early Eocene, with the first known genus being Palimphyes palaeocenicus from the earliest Eocene (formerly considered Late Paleocene)-aged Danata Formation. The family becomes widespread throughout the Tethys and Paratethys Oceans, until the Late Oligocene, when the genus Palimphyes disappears from the fossil record. Euzaphlegids would survive in deep water habitats of what is now Southern California, where they became mesopelagic predators ecologically similar to their relatives, the snake mackerels and escolars.

During the time of the Late Miocene, Southern California had a very warm, tropical climate. The transition from Late Miocene to Early Pliocene saw the climate cool, and this cooling event drove the surviving Euzaphlegidae and several other (locally) endemic fish species, such as the manefish Chalcidichthys and the spinyfin Absalomichthys, into extinction. This cooling event, coupled with the survival of the scombrids in southern Californian marine ecosystems, also helped prevent gempylids from replacing the Euzaphlegidae during the Pliocene or Pleistocene.

== See also ==
- List of prehistoric bony fish
