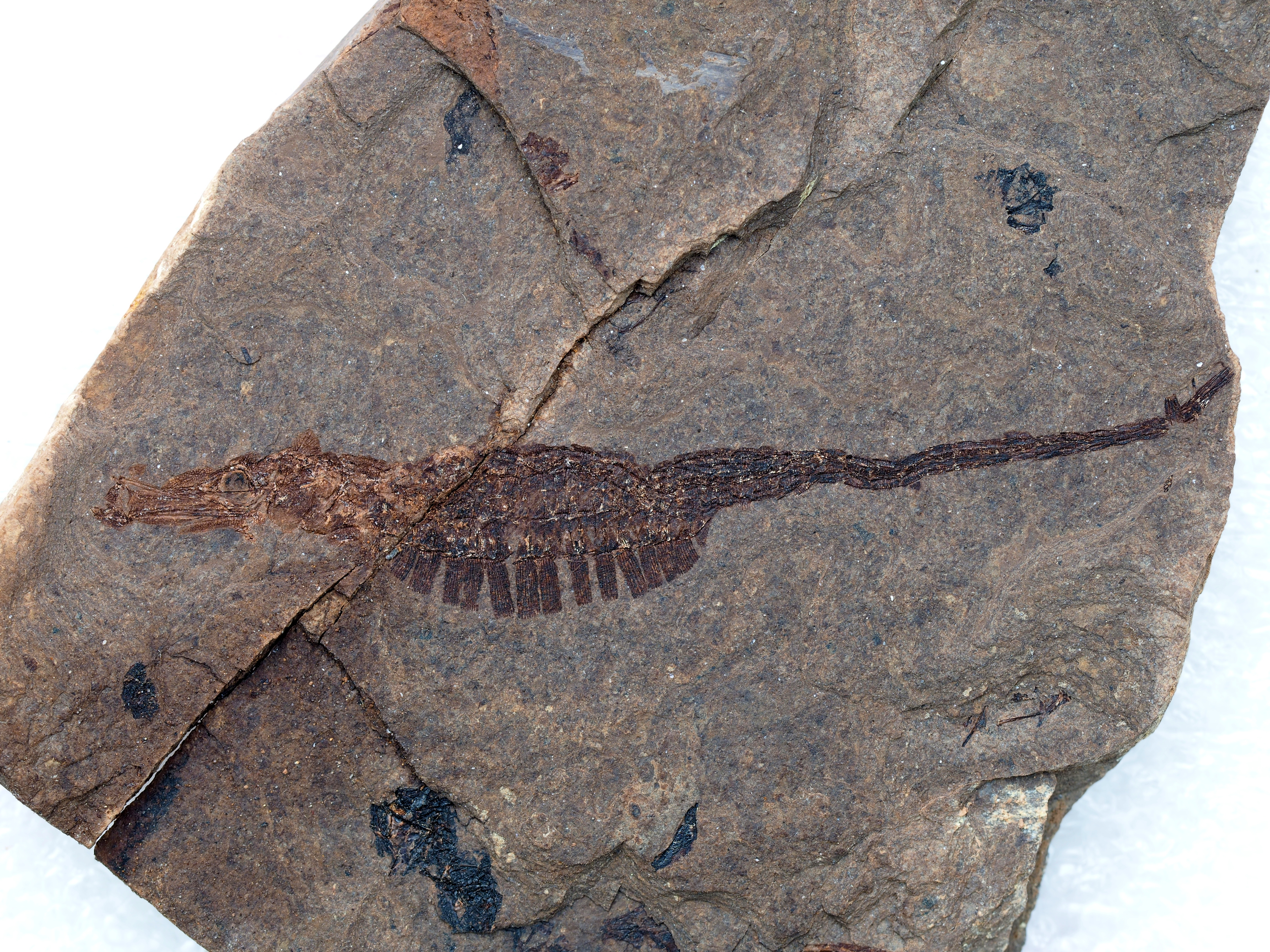
- Specimen of †H. neriticus from the Oligocene of Jamna Dolna, Poland.

Scientific classification
- Kingdom: Animalia
- Phylum: Chordata
- Class: Actinopterygii
- Division: Teleostei
- Order: Syngnathiformes
- Family: Syngnathidae
- Subfamily: Nerophinae
- Genus: †Hipposyngnathus; Daniltshenko, 1960

Species
- H. convexus Daniltshenko, 1960; H. imporcitor Fritzsche, 1980; H. neriticus Jerzmańska, 1968

= Hipposyngnathus =

Hipposyngnathus Temporal range: Early Oligocene to Late Miocene

Extinct genus of fish

Hipposyngnathus is an extinct genus of unusual prehistoric pipefish that lived throughout the Northern Hemisphere from the Oligocene to the Late Miocene epoch. As its name suggests, it convergently evolved a close morphology to seahorses (genus Hippocampus), with a developed trunk region and prominent armor shields. Two species are known from the Paratethys of eastern Europe, and one late-surviving species is known from the Pacific Coast of North America.

The following species are known:

- †H. convexus Daniltshenko, 1960 (type species) - Early Oligocene of North Caucasus, Russia (Pshekha Formation)
- †H. imporcitor Fritzsche, 1980 - Late Miocene of California, US (Monterey & Modelo Formations)
- †H. neriticus Jerzmańska, 1968 - Early Oligocene of Poland (Menilite Formation)

Due to its distinctive morphology, Hipposyngnathus was initially described in its own subfamily, Eogastrophinae. However, more recent studies suggest that it may potentially belong to the modern trunk-brooding pipefishes in the subfamily Nerophinae. This is further supported by the presence of a well-developed abdominal ridge on which fertilized eggs could be deposited, which has been speculated to have supported a brood pouch. However, other researchers hypothesize that Hipposyngnathus lacked a brood pouch entirely, with the eggs being attached to and completing their development on the surface of the abdominal ledge, a trait seen in some modern trunk-brooding pipefish such as Maroubra.

Some Hipposygnathus populations appear to have inhabited neritic habitats, based on co-occurrence with fossils of sublittoral fish such as Trachinus. However, other fossils are known from pelagic deposits, and are preserved together with fossils of Sargassum algae, seagrass, and swimming crabs, which is reminiscent of the assemblages that form around floating algae in pelagic ecosystems such as the Sargasso Sea, suggesting that Hipposyngnathus may have also inhabited floating Sargassum mats at the surface of the open ocean. It has a relatively short snout, indicating that it likely fed on slow-moving prey such as small crustaceans.
