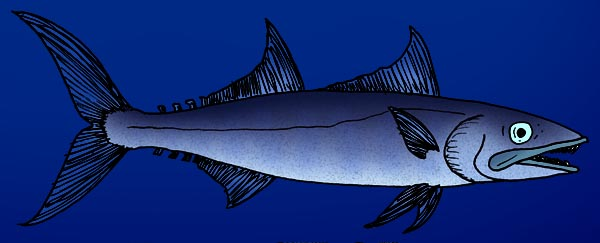
- Life restoration

Scientific classification
- Domain: Eukaryota
- Kingdom: Animalia
- Phylum: Chordata
- Class: Actinopterygii
- Order: Scombriformes
- Family: †Euzaphlegidae
- Genus: †Euzaphleges; White & Moy-Thomas, 1941
- Species: †E. longurio

Binomial name
- †Euzaphleges longurio (Jordan & Gilbert, 1921)

Synonyms
- †Zaphleges longurio Jordan & Gilbert, 1921

= Euzaphleges =

Euzaphleges Temporal range: Late Miocene (Tortonian)

Extinct genus of fishes

Euzaphleges is an extinct genus of superficially mackerel-like fish related to the escolar and snake mackerels. It contains a single species, E. longurio, and was found off the coast of what is now California during the late Miocene. Fossils are known from the presumably Tortonian-aged diatomite deposits of the Monterey Formation.

It was a member of the Euzaphlegidae, a now-extinct family of scombroid fish. It could reach about 25.5 inches (65 cm) in length, which was smaller than the very similar Thyrsocles and longer and more slender than Zaphlegulus, which also lived at the same time. It was much longer than the poorly known Trossulus.

== See also ==
- List of prehistoric bony fish
