= Caristius fasciatus =

Scientific classification
- Kingdom: Animalia
- Phylum: Chordata
- Class: Actinopterygii
- Order: Scombriformes
- Family: Caristiidae
- Genus: Caristius
- Species: C. fasciatus

Binomial name
- Caristius fasciatus (Borodin, 1930)

Synonyms
- Caristius groenlandicus Jensen, 1941; Platyberyx groenlandicus (Jensen, 1941); Pteraclis fasciatus Borodin, 1930

Species of fish

Caristius fasciatus, the Greenland manefish, is a species of fish.

== Description ==
This large-eyed round fish is compressed in cross section. It is a pale blue-grey in colour with a few irregular darker bars and a dark, sail-like dorsal fin. The anal fins, like the dorsal fin, are dark, while the caudal and pectoral fins are small and translucent. Their dorsal, pectoral and anal fins have no spines and are made up of only soft rays (31-34, 16-18 and 18-21 rays respectively). The longest recorded individual was 30 cm (12 in) long.

=== Similar species ===
The Greenland manefish has fewer and larger teeth and fewer vertebrae than Caristius macropus and Caristius meridionalis. It differs from Caristius digitus through the lack of a series of fingerlike papillae inside the opercle (the Greenland manefish has at most one), the short conical pharyngeal teeth (they are elongated in C. digitus), and fewer gill rakers.

== Distribution and habitat ==
This species is found in the Atlantic, Pacific and Indian oceans. It is known from the oceans around Argentina, Canada, Greenland, Namibia and South Africa. This species is found in the bethypelagic zone at depths of 100–420 m (330–1,380 ft). This species may, however, also rarely be found closer to the coast. In South Africa, for example, it was photographed at a depth of 15 m (49 ft) off Oudekraal.

== Ecology ==
While the diet of these species has not been examined in any detail, it is known to eat pelagic crustaceans, such as plankton. From the capture of females and juveniles, it is believed that spawning occurs on the edges of sub-tropical waters, such as the Sargasso Sea, around the Gulf Stream and off the Azores.
