= Seriphus =

The term Seriphus may refer to:

- Serifos, an island municipality in Greece
- Seriphus (fish), a genus of fish
