= Etringus =

Etringus Temporal range: Upper Miocene

Scientific classification
- Kingdom: Animalia
- Phylum: Chordata
- Class: Actinopterygii
- Order: Clupeiformes
- Suborder: Clupeoidei
- Genus: †Etringus; Jordan, 1907
- Species: †E. scintillans

Binomial name
- †Etringus scintillans Jordan, 1907

Extinct genus of fishes

Etringus is an extinct genus of prehistoric marine herring that lived during the Upper Miocene subepoch. It contains a single species, E. scintillans, known from the Modelo and Puente Formations of the Los Angeles Basin in California, US. It is known from both articulated skeletons and isolated scales.
