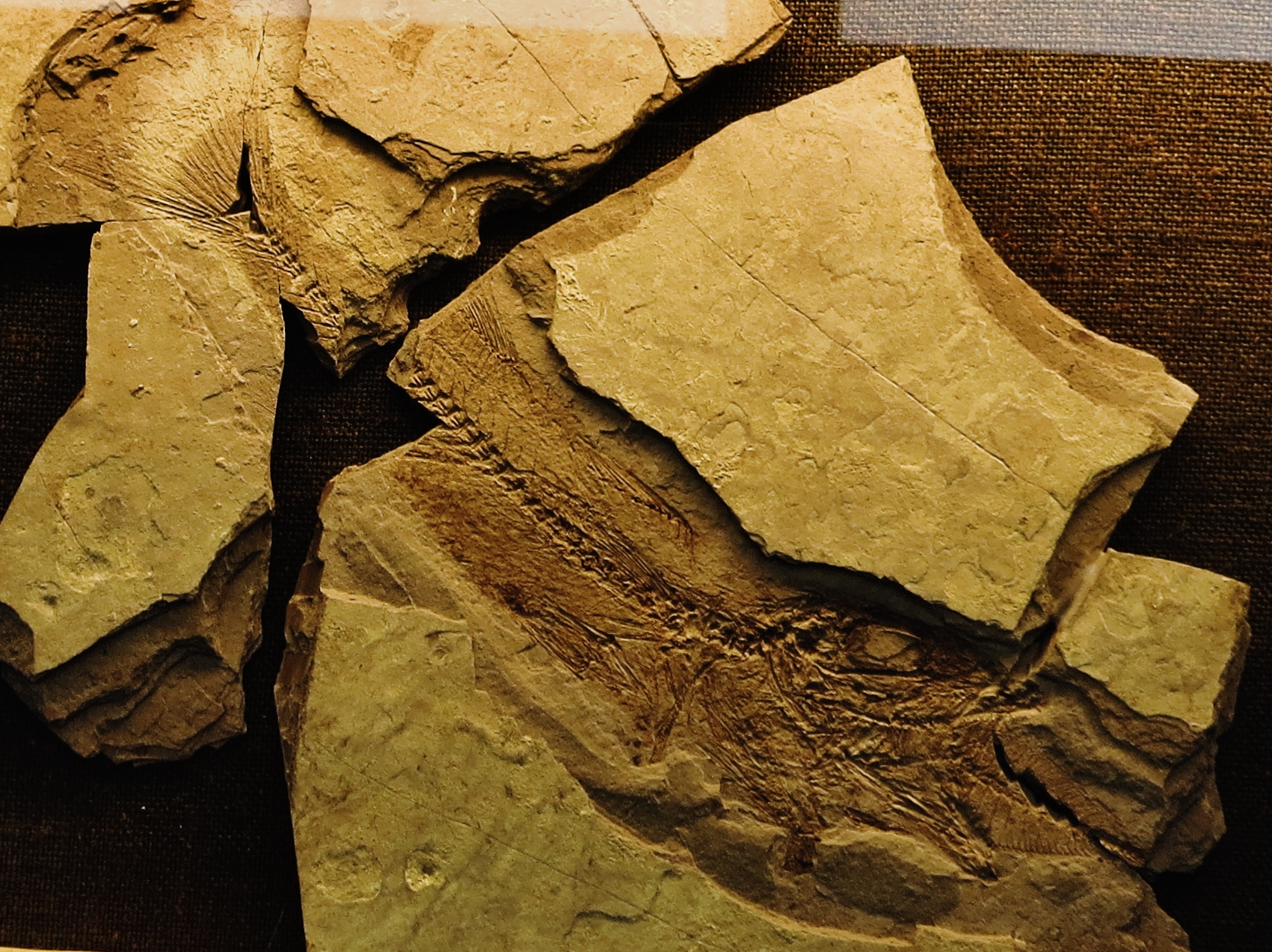
- Fossil of Palimphyes at the Bürgermeister-Müller-Museum

Scientific classification
- Kingdom: Animalia
- Phylum: Chordata
- Class: Actinopterygii
- Order: Scombriformes
- Family: †Euzaphlegidae
- Subfamily: †Dipterichthyinae; Arambourg, 1967
- Genus: †Palimphyes; Agassiz, 1835

Type species
- †Clupea elongata de Blainville, 1818

Species
- See text

Synonyms
- Dipterichthys Arambourg, 1967; Krambergeria Simionescu, 1904

= Palimphyes =

Palimphyes Temporal range: Earliest Ypresian to Rupelian

Extinct genus of fishes

Palimphyes is an extinct genus of marine ray-finned fish known from the Paleogene period. It was a euzaphlegid, an extinct family of scombroid fish related to the escolars and snake mackerels.

== Taxonomy ==
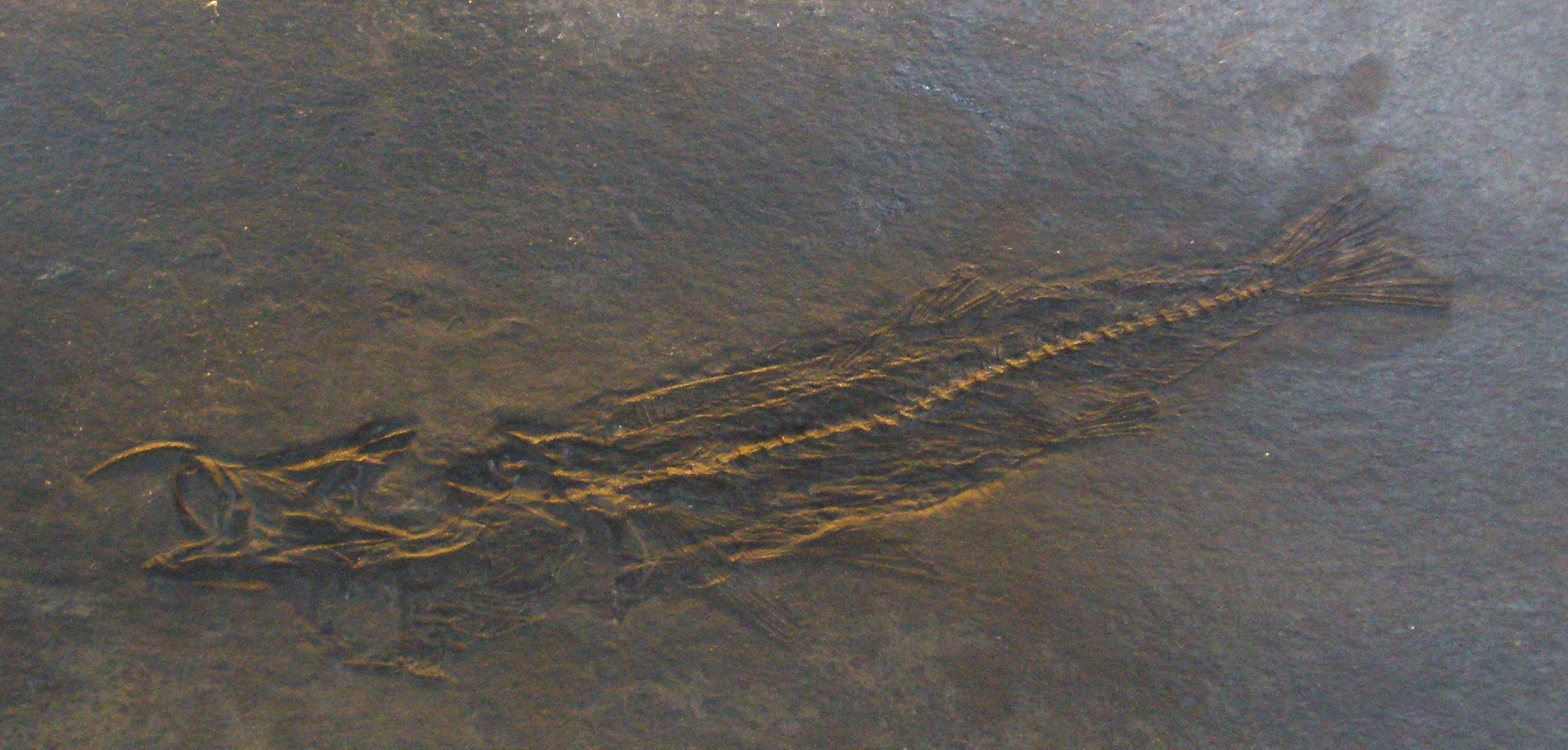
Fossil of P. elongatus

The various species lived as deepwater mesopelagic predators throughout the Tethys and Paratethys oceans, with fossils of ten species found in earliest Eocene to Oligocene strata of the Swiss Alps, the Carpathian and Caucasus Mountains, Iran, India, and Turkmenistan.

The following species are known:

- P. chadumicus Daniltshenko, 1960 - early Oligocene (Rupelian) of the North Caucasus, Russia (Pshekha Formation) (=P. longirostratus Daniltshenko, 1980)
- P. elongatus (de Blainville, 1818) (type species) - Rupelian of Canton Glarus, Switzerland (Glarner Schiefer Formation)
- P. lanceolatus (Simionescu, 1904) - Rupelian of Romania (=Krambergeria Simionescu, 1904)
- P. leptosomus (Arambourg, 1967) - Middle/Late Eocene (?Priabonian) of Iran (Pabdeh Formation) (=Dipterichthys leptosomus Arambourg, 1967)
- P. misrai Sahni & Choudhary, 1972 - early Eocene (Ypresian) of Rajasthan, India (Kapurdi Formation)
- ?P. nematophorus (Arambourg, 1967) - ?Priabonian of Iran (Pabdeh Formation) (=Dipterichthys nematophorus Arambourg, 1967)
- P. originis (Ciobanu, 1976) - Rupelian of Romania (=Dipterichthys originis Ciobanu, 1976)
- P. palaeocenicus Daniltshenko, 1968 - earliest Eocene (Ypresian) of Turkmenistan (Danata Formation)
- P. pinnatus Daniltshenko, 1962 - middle Eocene (Lutetian) of Georgia (Dabakhan Formation)
- P. pshekhaensis Bannikov, 1993 - middle Eocene (Bartonian) of Krasnodar Krai, Russia (Kuma Formation)
- P. stolyarovi Bratishko & Udovychenko, 2013 - Rupelian of Kazakhstan (Uzunbas Formation) & Crimea (Kyzyl-Dzhar Beds) [otolith]

Indeterminate species are also known from the early Oligocene-aged Menilite Formation of Poland and the Czech Republic.

== See also ==
- Prehistoric fish
- List of prehistoric bony fish
