= Marsupium =

Marsupium is the Latin word for a (brood) pouch in several animal groups:

- Pouch (marsupial), in marsupials
- Brood pouch (Peracarida), in peracarid crustaceans
- Brood pouch (Syngnathidae), in syngnathids such as sea horses
- Brood pouch (gastropod), a part of the reproductive system of gastropods, a structure in ovoviviparous gastropods, where embryos develop

== See also ==
- Brood (disambiguation)
- Pouch (disambiguation)
