= Horaclupea =

Horaclupea Temporal range: Early Eocene

Scientific classification
- Kingdom: Animalia
- Phylum: Chordata
- Class: Actinopterygii
- Order: Clupeiformes
- Suborder: Clupeoidei
- Genus: †Horaclupea; Borkar, 1973

Species
- †H. geei (Hora, 1937); †H. intertrappea Borkar, 1973

Synonyms
- Clupea geei Hora, 1937

Extinct species of ray-finned fish

Horaclupea is an extinct genus of freshwater and estuarine ray-finned fish that inhabited the Indian subcontinent during the early Eocene. It was a clupeoid, making it related to modern herrings and anchovies. It was named after Indian ichthyologist Sunder Lal Hora, who described the first species of the genus.

It contains two species:

- †H. geei (Hora, 1937) - early Eocene of the Salt Range in Kohat District, Pakistan (syn: Clupea geei Hora, 1937)
- †H. intertrappea Borkar, 1973 - early Eocene of the Intertrappean Beds near Bamanbore, India

H. geei was initially described as Clupea geei from multiple specimens, one relatively complete, in an Eocene estuarine fossil fish assemblage discovered near Malgin in Kohat District, Pakistan. H. intertrappea was described in the new genus Horaclupea from several articulated specimens from freshwater sediments in the Intertrappean Beds of India. These formations were initially dated to the Late Paleocene or early Eocene, and were later re-dated as Cretaceous or earliest Paleocene. However, more recent studies using palynostratigrapy have confirmed that the Bamanbore deposits are Early Eocene in age.

The abundance of H. geei in estuarine sediments, in addition to the occurrence of H. intertrappea in freshwater sediments, suggests that Horaclupea may have been an anadromous taxon that migrated up rivers to breed and schooled in large shoals. It was initially suggested that H. geei may represent the young stage of a hilsa-like clupeid, but the lack of any adult specimens in the Kohat assemblage, as well as the presence of similar individuals in the Intertrappean Beds, indicates that it may just represent a small-sized clupeid species.

It was described as being potentially related to Diplomystus, but that taxon has since been classified into a different order (Ellimmichthyiformes). However, recent taxonomic reviews have retained Horaclupea as an indeterminate clupeid.
