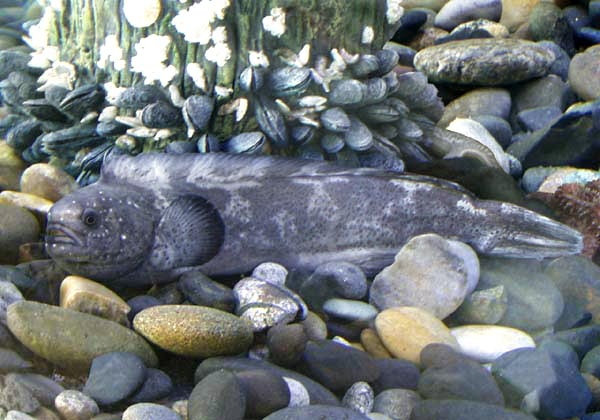

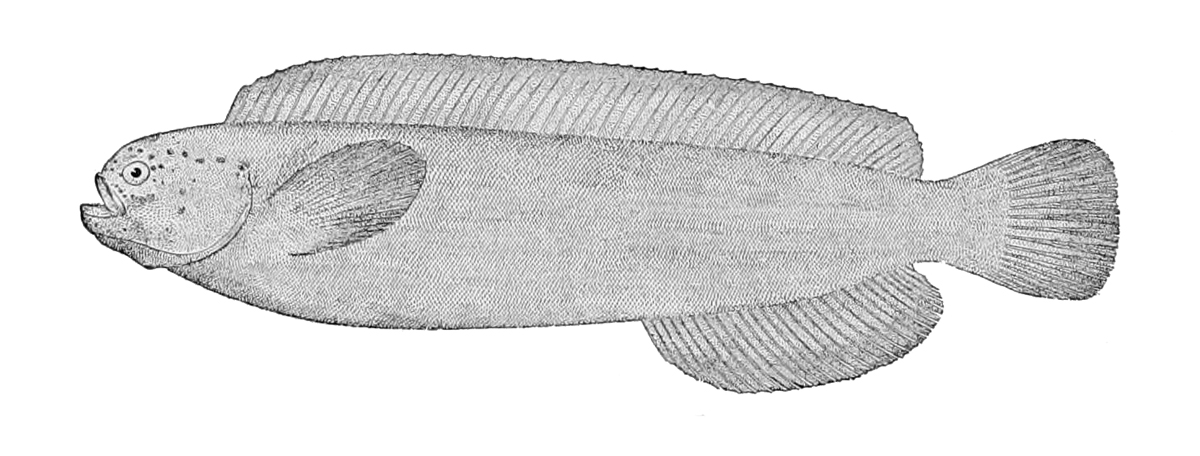

Scientific classification
- Kingdom: Animalia
- Phylum: Chordata
- Class: Actinopterygii
- Division: Teleostei
- Order: Perciformes
- Suborder: Zoarcoidei
- Family: Zaproridae; Jordan and Evermann, 1898
- Genus: Zaprora; Jordan, 1896
- Species: Z. silenus

Binomial name
- Zaprora silenus Jordan, 1896

= Prowfish =

Prowfish Temporal range: Middle Miocene–present

Species of fish

The prowfish (Zaprora silenus) is a species of scorpaeniform marine fish found in the northern Pacific Ocean. It is the only extant member of the family, Zaproridae.

== Fossil record ==
There are 2 extinct species only known with fossil records, †Zaprora koreana Nam & Nazarkin, 2018 from the Middle Miocene Duho Formation in Pohang, South Korea. Another genus, †Araeosteus rothi Jordan & Gilbert, 1920, is known from the Monterey Formation and the Modelo Formation in Southern California.

== Distribution ==
Prowfish range from the Aleutian Islands, Alaska west to Kamchatka, Russia; from Navarin Canyon in the Bering Sea south to Hokkaidō, Japan and Monterey, California. An otherwise little-known species, prowfish are important to subsistence fisheries in remote regions.

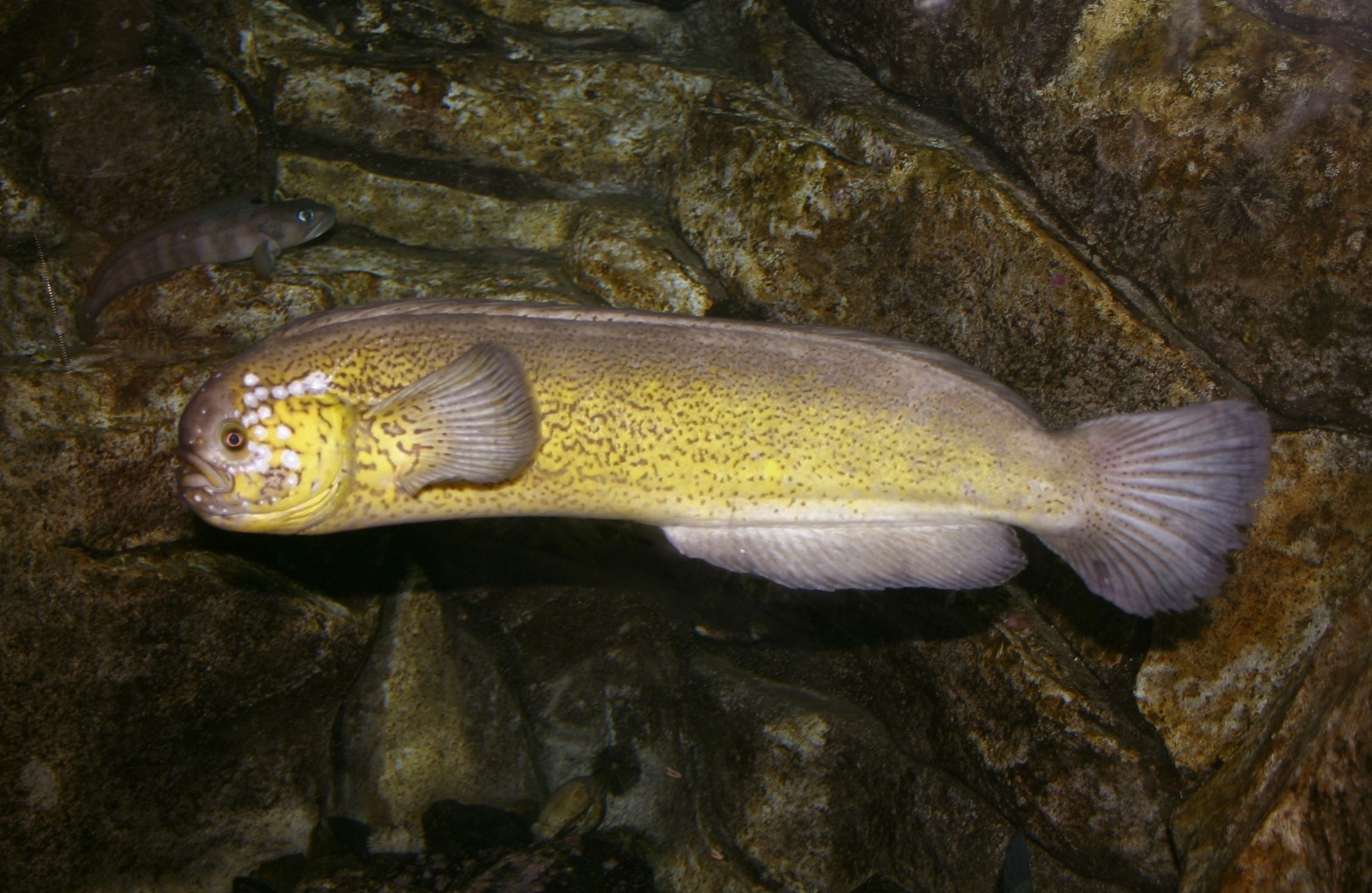
Adult prowfish

== Description ==
Growing to a length of 88 cm (35 in), prowfish have stout, laterally compressed and elongated bodies. They have single, somewhat high dorsal fin running nearly the entire length of the back; it may contain 54–58 pliable spines. The anal fin is also fairly extensive. The tail fin is large, rounded and truncated; the pectoral fins are enlarged and pelvic fins are conspicuously absent. The mouth is slightly upturned with small, closely set, sharp teeth confined to the jaws. The head is convex, ending in a projecting snout. This explains the family name Zaproridae; from the Greek za, an intensifier, and prora meaning "prow". The species name silneus is a reference to Silenus, a figure in Greek mythology.

The distinctive head of the prowfish also features a number of sensory pores made all the more obvious by fringes of blue or white. Prowfish have small ctenoid scales and a variable coloration; typically, they are bluish-grey to olive brown with small dark spots, grading to lighter shades ventrally. The lateral line and swim bladder are absent.

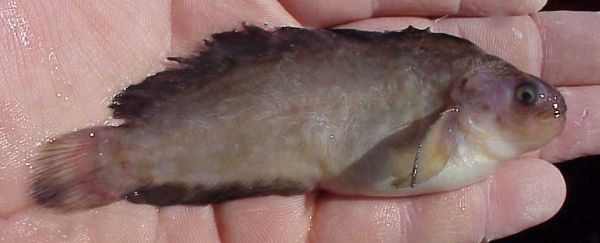
Juvenile

== Biology ==
Prowfish prefer rocky substrates and range from relatively shallow waters to 675 m (2,215 ft). They are benthic animals spending most of their time on or near the bottom. Their diet consists principally of scyphozoans and salps; prowfish use their large mouths to tear chunks from the bells of jellyfish and ctenophores. Prowfish may also eat smaller fish and amphipods; however, juveniles feed exclusively on jellyfish. Larger skates and Pacific halibut are known predators of prowfish.

Little is known of prowfish reproduction, but juveniles have been observed to be pelagic; unlike adults, they spend their time in the middle levels of the water column, closely associated with their jellyfish prey. Indeed, juvenile prowfish will seek shelter from prey within the bells of larger jellies. This behaviour has led to their confusion with the medusafish (Icichthys lockingtoni) of the family Centrolophidae. Most female prowfish are thought to reach maturity at around five years. There is little sexual dimorphism; females are slightly heavier for their length.

== See also ==
- List of fish common names
- List of fish families
