= Neocaristius =

Scientific classification
- Kingdom: Animalia
- Phylum: Chordata
- Class: Actinopterygii
- Division: Teleostei
- Order: Scombriformes
- Family: Caristiidae
- Genus: Neocaristius; D. E. Stevenson & Kenaley, 2011
- Species: N. heemstrai

Binomial name
- Neocaristius heemstrai Trunov, E. I. Kukuev & Parin, 2006

Synonyms
- Paracaristius heemstrai Trunov, Kukuev & Parin, 2006

Species of ray-finned fish

Neocaristius heemstrai is a species of fish in the family Caristiidae, the manefishes. It is native to the oceans of the southern hemisphere where it is known to occur at depths of from 420 to 1,360 metres (1,380 to 4,460 ft). This species grows to a length of 11.8 centimetres (4.6 in) SL.

This fish was first described in 2006 and was moved to a monotypic genus of its own, Neocaristius, in 2011.

== Etymology ==
The fish is named in honor of Phillip C. Heemstra (1941–2019), of the J.L.B. Smith Institute of Ichthyology in Grahamstown, South Africa, for his contributions to the studies of marine fishes, and in 1986 was the first to draw attention to this species.
