= Brood =

Brood may refer to:

== Nature ==
- Brood, a collective term for offspring
- Brooding, the incubation of bird eggs by their parents
- Bee brood, the young of a beehive
- Individual broods of North American periodical cicadas:
  - Brood X, the largest brood, which emerges on a 17-year cycle
  - Brood XIII, a brood centered on Northern Illinois and its surrounding area, which also emerges on a 17-year cycle
  - Brood XIX, a large brood in the Southern United States which emerges on a 13-year cycle

== People with the surname ==
- Herman Brood (1946–2001), Dutch musician, painter, actor, poet and media personality
- Philippe Brood (1964–2000), Dutch politician

== Entertainment ==
- The Brood, a 1979 horror film directed by David Cronenberg
- Brood (comics), an alien species from the Marvel Comics universe
- The Brood (professional wrestling), and The New Brood, WWF professional wrestling stables in 1999
- "The Brood", an episode of the television series of Exosquad
- Brood, the dragon clan in Breath of Fire III

== Music ==
- The Brood (band), a crossover thrash band from Venice, California
- The Brood (album), a 1984 album by Herman Brood
- Brood (album), 1994 album by Melbourne band My Friend the Chocolate Cake
- Broods (duo), a New Zealand pop music duo
- Elliott Brood, a death country band from Toronto

== See also ==
- Brod (disambiguation)
