= Sunder Lal Hora =

Indian ichthyologist

Sunder Lal Hora FRSE FLS
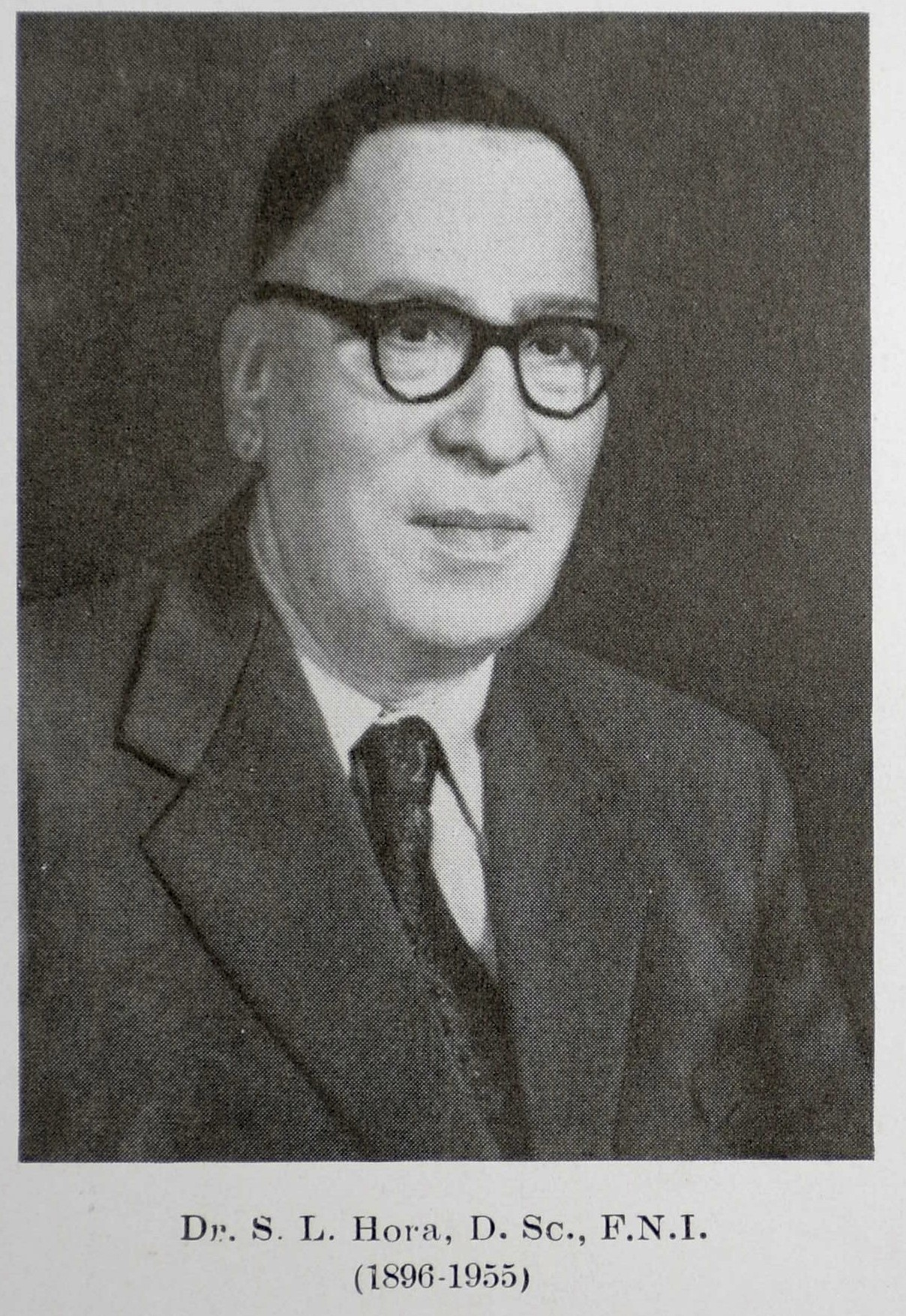

Director of the Zoological Survey of India
- In office May 1947 – December 1955
- Preceded by: Baini Prashad
- Succeeded by: Mithan Lal Roonwal

Personal details
- Born: 22 May 1896 Hafizabad, British Punjab
- Died: 8 December 1955 (aged 59) Calcutta, West Bengal, India
- Occupation: Ichthyologist

Sunder Lal Hora FRSE FLS (22 May 1896 – 8 December 1955) was an Indian ichthyologist known for his biogeographic theory on the affinities of Western Ghats and Indomalayan fish forms.

== Life ==
Hora was born at Hafizabad in the Punjab (modern day Pakistan) on 2 May 1896. He schooled in Jullunder before college at Lahore. He met Thomas Nelson Annandale who visited his college in Lahore in 1919 and was invited to the Zoological Survey of India. In 1921 he became in-charge of ichthyology and herpetology and in 1947 became Superintendent of the Z.S.I. and then Director after Baini Prashad moved to become an advisor to the government.

He was elected a Fellow of the Royal Society of Edinburgh in 1929. His proposers were James Hartley Ashworth, John Stephenson, Charles Henry O'Donoghue and James Ritchie.

He died on 8 December 1955.

== Works ==
The Satpura hypothesis, a zoo-geographical hypothesis proposed by him that suggests that the central Indian Satpura Range of hills acted as a bridge for the gradual migrations of Malayan fauna into the peninsula and the Western Ghats of India. He supported the theory on the basis of torrential fishes which had special suckers to hold onto rocks. Later research however pointed out that his examples made use of unrelated species showing common characters that were independently evolved, that is they were examples of convergent evolution.

Hora was also among the Indian pioneers of fish and wildlife conservation and pointed out the effect of dams on the migrations of riverine fishes and noted the poor design of fish ladders in Indian dams.

== Taxon described by him ==
- See Category:Taxa named by Sunder Lal Hora

== Taxon named in his honor ==
- The Hora razorbelly minnow or Hora's razorbelly minnow, Salmostoma horai is a species of ray-finned fish in the genus Salmostoma.
- A genus of ricefish, Horaichthys ("Hora's Fish"), was created in his honour and placed as a sole member of the family Horaichthyidae. The species is now placed in the genus Oryzias and the family is no longer considered valid.
- The catfish genus Horabagrus is named after the Indian zoologist Sunder Lal Hora. Horabagrus is usually classified under the family Bagridae, but there are disagreements.
- An extinct genus of fossil clupeid, Horaclupea, is named in honor of him.

== Bibliography ==
- Hora, S. L. 1944. On the Malayan affinities of the freshwater fish fauna of Peninsular India, and its bearing on the probable age of the Garo-Rajmahal Gap. Proc. Natl. Inst. Sci. India, 10(2):423–439.
- Hora, S. L. 1949. Satpura Hypothesis of the Distribution of the Malayan Fauna and Flora to Peninsular India. Proc. Natl. Inst. Sci. India, 15(8):309–314.
