= Eclipes =

Eclipes Temporal range: Late Miocene

Scientific classification
- Domain: Eukaryota
- Kingdom: Animalia
- Phylum: Chordata
- Class: Actinopterygii
- Order: Gadiformes
- Family: Gadidae
- Genus: †Eclipes; Jordan & Gilbert, 1919

Type species
- †Eclipes veternus Jordan & Gilbert, 1919

Species
- †E. extensus Jordan, 1921; †E. manni Jordan, 1921; †E. santamonicae David, 1943; †E. veternus Jordan & Gilbert, 1919

Extinct genus of fishes

Eclipes is an extinct genus of prehistoric marine ray-finned fish that lived off the coast of western North America during the Late Miocene. It was a member of the Gadidae, making it closely related to modern cods and haddocks. The several species known from this genus inhabited deep waters in what is now the Los Angeles Basin of southern California.

The following species are known:

- †E. extensus Jordan, 1921 - Barstovian of California
- †E. manni Jordan, 1921 - Tortonian of California (Monterey Formation)
- †E. santamonicae David, 1943 - Late Miocene of California (Modelo Formation)
- †E. veternus Jordan & Gilbert, 1919 - Tortonian of California (Monterey Formation)
