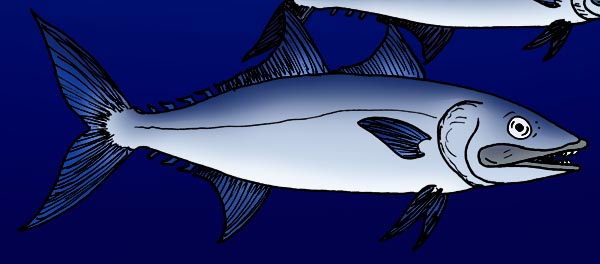
- Z. venturaensis

Scientific classification
- Kingdom: Animalia
- Phylum: Chordata
- Class: Actinopterygii
- Order: Scombriformes
- Family: †Euzaphlegidae
- Genus: †Zaphlegulus; David, 1943

Type species
- †Zaphlegulus venturaensis David, 1943

= Zaphlegulus =

Zaphlegulus Temporal range: Late Miocene

Extinct genus of fishes

Zaphlegulus venturaensis is an extinct, superficially mackerel-like, fish related to the cutlassfish and snake mackerels found off the coast of what is now California during the late Miocene. Z. venturaensis was shorter, but stouter than either of the other two better known genera of the extinct family Zaphlegidae, Thyrsocles and Euzaphleges, which also lived at the same time.

== See also ==
- List of prehistoric bony fish
