= Elephant Hill Open Space =

Park in California, United States of America

Coordinates: 34°05′42″N 118°10′30″W

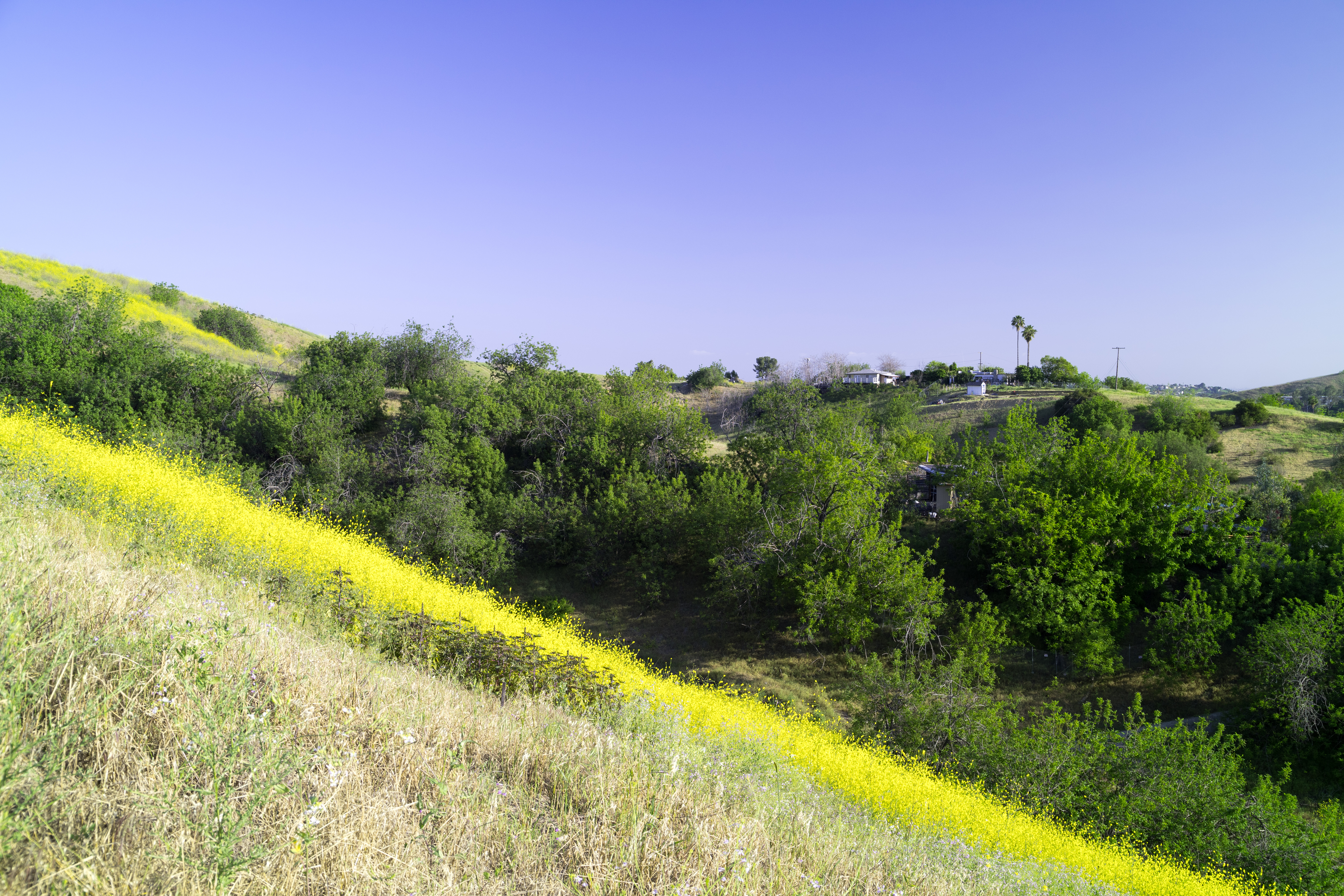
Elephant Hill Open Space and neighboring private homes

Elephant Hill Open Space is an urban park on a hill in El Sereno in Los Angeles County, California. It is part of the Repetto Hills.

Portions of Elephant Hill have been privately developed. The central tract was rezoned as open space in 2012. The open space is managed by the Mountains Recreation and Conservancy Authority (MRCA). MRCA "owns and manages approximately eight acres of land in Elephant Hill", with a budget to improve the property and acquire additional parcels from private owners.
