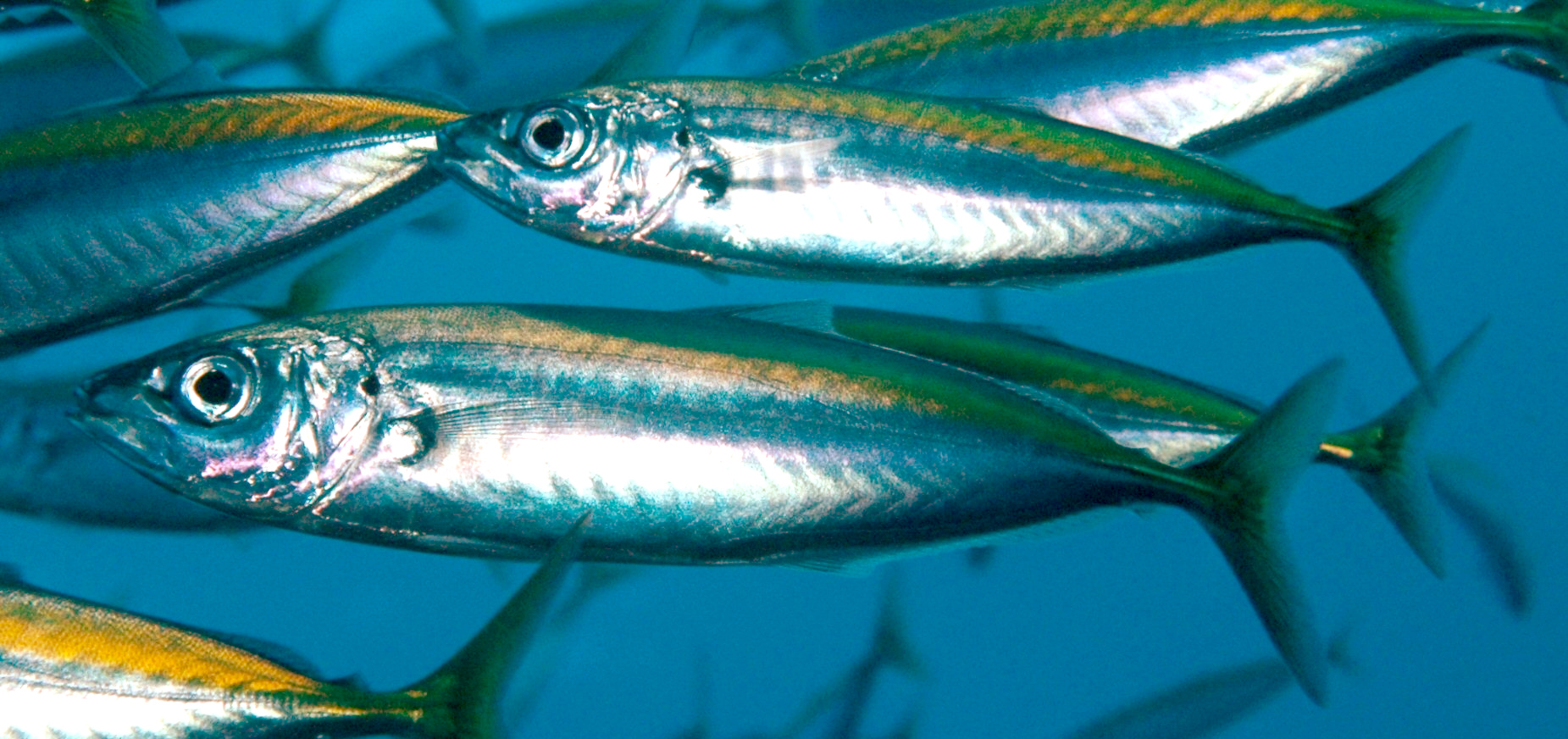

Conservation status
- Least Concern (IUCN 3.1)

Scientific classification
- Kingdom: Animalia
- Phylum: Chordata
- Class: Actinopterygii
- Order: Carangiformes
- Suborder: Carangoidei
- Family: Carangidae
- Genus: Decapterus
- Species: D. koheru

Binomial name
- Decapterus koheru (Hector, 1875)

Synonyms
- Caranx koheru Hector, 1875

= Kōheru =

Species of ray-finned fish

The kōheru (Decapterus koheru), also known as the scad, is a ray-finned fish of the genus Decapterus, part of the family Carangidae. It is endemic to New Zealand where it occurs from Manawatāwhi / Three Kings Islands to southern North Island. This is a schooling, pelagic species of coastal waters where it is found within shallow bays, harbours, estuaries and near rocky reefs and offshore islands at depths of between 2 and 90 metres (6.6 and 295.3 ft). Juveniles prefer rocky inshore areas, while adults are known to form dense schools in offshore waters. The maximum fork length is 40.3 centimetres (15.9 in). They live to around 10 years and juveniles growth quickly, attaining a fork length of 37 centimetres (15 in) by the time they are three years old. They feed on zooplankton. It is a species of minor interest to commercial fisheries but is taken by recreational anglers.

== Names ==
Decapterus koheru is commonly known in English as the kōheru or scad. In the indigenous Māori language, they are known as kōheriheri or kōheru, while half-grown kōheru are known as tangiharuru and kōheru fry being known as kōtaratara.
