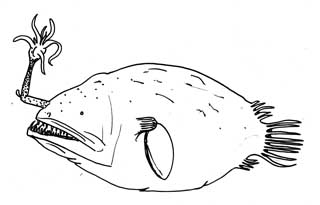

Conservation status
- Least Concern (IUCN 3.1)

Scientific classification
- Kingdom: Animalia
- Phylum: Chordata
- Class: Actinopterygii
- Order: Lophiiformes
- Family: Oneirodidae
- Genus: Chaenophryne
- Species: C. draco

Binomial name
- Chaenophryne draco Beebe, 1932

Synonyms
- Chaenophryne parviconus Regan & Trewavas, 1932; Chaenophryne melanodactylus Regan & Trewavas, 1932; Chaenophryne atriconus Regan & Trewavas, 1932; Chaenophryne columnifera Regan & Trewavas, 1932; Chaenophryne macractis Regan & Trewavas, 1932

= Chaenophryne draco =

Species of fish

Chaenophryne draco, the smooth dreamer, or smooth-headed dreamer, is a species of marine ray-finned fish belonging to the family Oneirodidae, the dreamers, a family of deep-sea anglerfishes. This predatory, deep-sea fish is found in the tropical and subtropical oceans around the world. Like other deep-sea anglerfishes, it is sexually dimorphic, with the metamorphosed females dwarfing the metamorphosed males. The males are not sexual parasites.

== Taxonomy ==
Chaenophryne draco was first formally described in 1932 by the American naturalist, ornithologist, marine biologist, entomologist, explorer and author William Beebe, with its type locality given as 10 miles (16 km) southeast of Nonsuch Island at 32°12'N, 64°36'W from a depth of 600 fathoms (3,600 ft; 1,100 m). The 5th edition of Fishes of the World classifies the genus Chaenophryne in the family Oneirodidae in the suborder Ceratioidei of the anglerfish order Lophiiformes.

== Etymology ==
Chaenophryne draco belongs to the genus Chaenophryne, this name being a combination of chaeno, which means "gape", with phryne, meaning "toad". What this name alludes to was not explained by Regan, but the first part may refer to the wide mouth of C. longiceps. The second part is a suffix commonly used in the names of anglerfish genera. Its use for these fishes may date as far back as Aristotle and Cicero, who referred to anglerfishes as "fishing-frogs" and "sea-frogs", respectively, possibly because of their resemblance to frogs and toads. The specific name, draco, means "dragon", an allusion which Beebe did not explain.

== Description ==
Chaenophryne draco is sexually dimorphic, and dreamers in the genus Chaenophryne are distinguished from other dreamers by both the metamorphosed males and females. They are further distinguished from other genera of Oneirodidae by the long and slender suboperculum which has a tapering point at its upper end, and by having a slightly concave rear edge to the operculum. The metamorphosed females do not have any sphenotic spines, although there are blunt ridges on the parietal and post-temporal bones. The rear edge of the frontal bone is highly curved. They have pigmented skin which clearly extends past the base of the caudal fin. They have a pigmented snout, the rear nostril is separate from the eye, and there are 17-27 teeth on the lower denticular. In this species there are between 6 and 8 soft rays in the dorsal fin and 5 or 6 soft rays in the anal fin. The caudal fin is large and the pectoral fins are limb-like and directed upwards. The overall colour is black apart from the pale esca. The esca differs from those of congeners by having no anteriolateral appendages and in the higher ratio of upper denticular teeth to lower denticular teeth. Its size range is unknown, but it is thought to grow from 8.3 to 12.3 cm (3.3 to 4.8 in) in length based on two unsexed individuals and one female individual.

== Distribution and habitat ==
Chaenophryne draco is found in the non-polar oceans throughout the world, between 44°N and 42°S in the bathypelagic zone at depths of 350 to 1,750 m (1,150 to 5,740 ft).

== Biology ==
Chaenophryne draco feeds on fish, cephalopods and crustaceans. The males are considerably smaller than the females but are not sexually parasitic on them.
