= Paracaristius =

Scientific classification
- Kingdom: Animalia
- Phylum: Chordata
- Class: Actinopterygii
- Order: Scombriformes
- Family: Caristiidae
- Genus: Paracaristius; Trunov, Kukuev & Parin, 2006

Type species
- Caristius maderensis Maul, 1949

Genus of ray-finned fishes

Paracaristius is a genus of ray-finned fish in the family Caristiidae, the manefishes. It is a small genus with mostly newly described species.

Fish in this genus are separated from similar taxa by the arrangement of their teeth. They have compressed heads with very short snouts, small mouths, and two nostrils. The body is oval to rectangular. The lateral line is not visible. The dorsal fin extends along nearly the whole top edge of the body, and the pectoral fin is "delicate" and "fan-like".

Neocaristius heemstrai has since been moved from Paracaristius and placed in a new genus of its own.

== Species ==
There are currently four recognized species in this genus:

- Paracaristius aquilus D. E. Stevenson & Kenaley, 2011
- Paracaristius maderensis (Maul, 1949)
- Paracaristius nemorosus D. E. Stevenson & Kenaley, 2011
- Paracaristius nudarcus D. E. Stevenson & Kenaley, 2011
