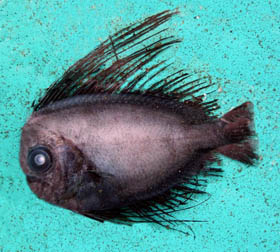
- Manefish (C. macropus)

Scientific classification
- Kingdom: Animalia
- Phylum: Chordata
- Class: Actinopterygii
- Order: Scombriformes
- Family: Caristiidae
- Genus: Caristius; T. N. Gill & H. M. Smith, 1905

Type species
- Caristius japonicus T. N. Gill & H. M. Smith, 1905

= Caristius =

Genus of ray-finned fishes

Caristius is a genus of manefishes native to the Atlantic and Pacific Oceans.

== Ecology ==
A member of the genus Caristius associates with the siphonophore Bathyphysa conifera, using it for shelter, stealing meals, and perhaps nibbling on its host as well, yet protecting it from amphipod parasites such as Themisto. This symbiotic relationship appears mutualistic.

== Species ==
The currently recognized species in this genus are:

- Caristius andriashevi Kukuev, Parin & Trunov, 2012
- Caristius barsukovi Kukuev, Parin & Trunov, 2013
- Caristius digitus D. E. Stevenson & Kenaley, 2013
- Caristius fasciatus (Borodin, 1930)
- Caristius japonicus T. N. Gill & H. M. Smith, 1905
- Caristius litvinovi Kukuev, Parin & Trunov, 2013
- Caristius macropus (Bellotti, 1903) (Manefish)
- Caristius meridionalis D. E. Stevenson & Kenaley, 2013
- Caristius walvisensis Kukuev, Parin & Trunov, 2013
