= Ganoessus =

Ganoessus Temporal range: Upper Miocene (Tortonian)

Scientific classification
- Kingdom: Animalia
- Phylum: Chordata
- Class: Actinopterygii
- Order: Clupeiformes
- Suborder: Clupeoidei
- Genus: †Ganoessus; Jordan, 1920

Species
- †G. clepsydra (Jordan & Gilbert, 1919); †G. meiklejohni (Jordan, 1925); †G. michaelis (Jordan, 1925)

Synonyms
- Epelichthys Jordan, 1925; Lembicus Jordan, 1925

Extinct genus of fishes

Ganoessus is an extinct genus of prehistoric marine herring that inhabited the coast of western North America during the Miocene. It contains three species, all known from the Upper Miocene of California, US.

The following species are known:

- †G. clepsydra (Jordan & Gilbert, 1919) - Tortonian of Monterey Formation & Puente Formation
- †G. meiklejohni (Jordan, 1925) - Tortonian of Puente Formation
- †G. michaelis (Jordan, 1925) - Tortonian of Monterey Formation

It was a relatively large fish with coarse, enameled scales. Its morphology, including well-developed abdominal scutes, may potentially suggest a relationship to the Alosidae, but this is uncertain.
