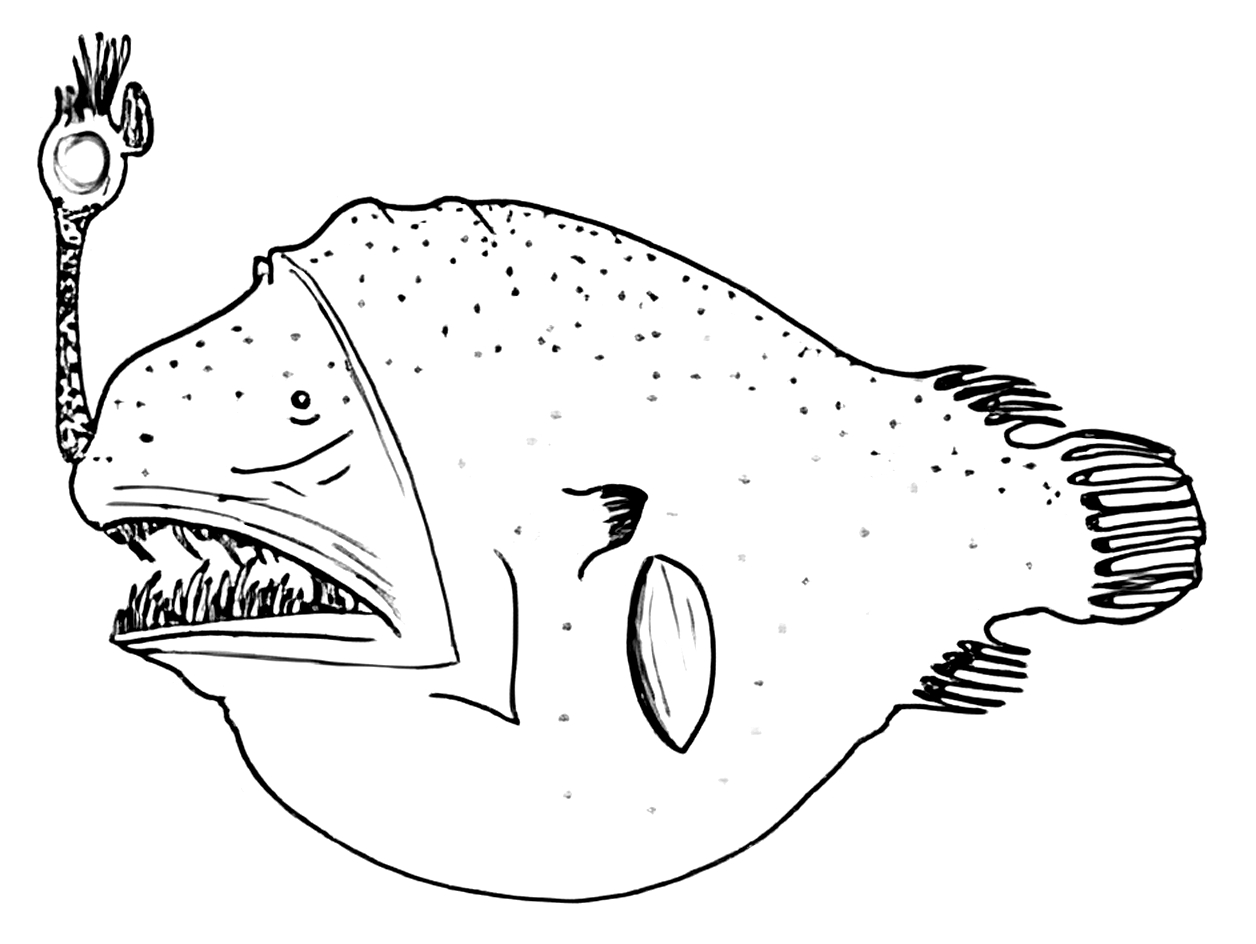

Conservation status
- Least Concern (IUCN 3.1)

Scientific classification
- Kingdom: Animalia
- Phylum: Chordata
- Class: Actinopterygii
- Division: Teleostei
- Order: Lophiiformes
- Family: Oneirodidae
- Genus: Chaenophryne
- Species: C. longiceps

Binomial name
- Chaenophryne longiceps (Regan, 1925)

Synonyms
- Chaenophryne bicornis Regan & Trewavas, 1932; Chaenophryne crenata Regan & Trewavas, 1932; Chaenophryne crossotus Beebe, 1932; Chaenophryne haplactis Regan & Trewavas, 1932; Chaenophryne longiceps quadrifilis Parr, 1927; Chaenophryne quadrifilis Parr, 1927

= Chaenophryne longiceps =

Species of fish

Chaenophryne longiceps, the longhead dreamer or smooth-head dreamer, is a species of marine ray-finned fish belonging to the family Oneirodidae, the dreamers, a family of deep-sea anglerfishes. This predatory, deep-sea fish is found in tropical and subtropical oceans around the world. Like other deep-sea anglerfishes, it is sexually dimorphic with the metamorphosed females dwarfing the metamorphosed males, though the males are not sexual parasites.

== Etymology ==
Chaenophryne longiceps is the type species of the genus Chaenophryne, this name being a combination of chaeno, which means "gape", with phryne, meaning "toad". What this name alludes to was not explained by Regan, but the first part may refer to the wide mouth of C. longiceps. The second part is a suffix commonly used in the names of anglerfish genera. Its use for these fishes may date as far back as Aristotle and Cicero, who referred to anglerfishes as "fishing-frogs" and "sea-frogs," respectively, possibly because of their resemblance to frogs and toads. The specific name, longiceps, means "long head" and Regan described this species as having a long head with a recurved dorsal profile.

The name "can-opener smoothdream" was coined by D. E. McAllister in his 1990 book A List of the Fishes of Canada, being one of many common names he conceived in the book (French: doux-rêve ouvre-boîte). These common names were subsequently used in the Encyclopedia of Canadian Fishes by Brian W. Coad. In a review of Coad's book, Erling Holm remarked that many of the names coined by Mcallister differed significantly from the standard set by Robins et al., deemed widely accepted, and promoted by the Committee on Names of Fishes. For the names of deep-sea fish (including "can-opener smooth-dream"), which are unlikely to have day-to-day use, Holm deemed the names "unnecessarily complex, easily misspelled, or downright silly".

== Taxonomy ==
Chaenophryne longiceps was first formally described in 1925 by the English ichthyologist Charles Tate Regan with its type locality given as 7°30'N, 79°19'W, off the Gulf of Panama at a depth of 1,500 m (4,900 ft). When Regan described this species he proposed the new genus Chaenophryne, so this species is the type species of that genus by monotypy. The 5th edition of Fishes of the World classifies the genus Chaenophryne in the family Oneirodidae in the suborder Ceratioidei of the anglerfish order Lophiiformes.

== Description ==
Chaenophryne longiceps has an obvious illicium which projects from the snout and a globose body. There are between 6 and 8 soft rays in the dorsal fin, while the anal fin has 5 or 6 soft rays. A distinguishing feature of the metamorphosed females of this species is that it has more pectoral fin rays, between 17 and 22 and typically no fewer than 18, in comparison to any other species in the genus Chaenophryne. The esca elongate appendages at the sides of its front have internal pigmentation, varying in length from 10% of the length of the esca's bulb to being greater in length than the bulb. The males are dwarfed and have between 17 and 22 denticles on the upper jaw and 23 to 27 on the lower jaw. The larvae, males and non-metamorphosed females have a group of melanophores beneath the skin on the caudal peduncle. The maximum published length of this species is 24.5 cm (9.6 in).

== Habitat ==
Chaenophryne longiceps is a bathypelagic species, sometimes entering the mesopelagic zone, and it is found at depths between 500 and 1,000 m (1,600 and 3,300 ft) in tropical to temperate parts of all the Earth's oceans. In 2010 it was found off Greenland for the first time.

== Biology ==
Chaenophryne longiceps feeds on fish, cephalopods and crustaceans. The males are around 1.8 cm (0.71 in) in length and attach themselves to the much larger females using the specialised denticles on outside of the jaws, but they are not sexually parasitic on the females.
