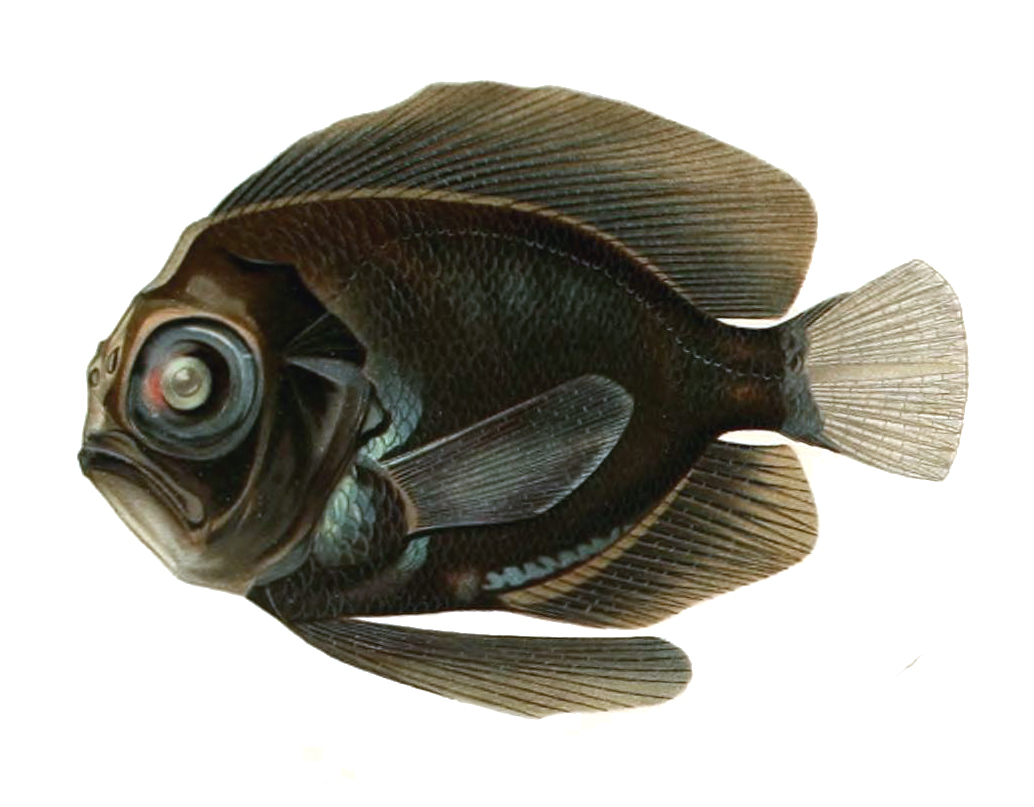
- P. opalescens

Scientific classification
- Domain: Eukaryota
- Kingdom: Animalia
- Phylum: Chordata
- Class: Actinopterygii
- Order: Scombriformes
- Family: Caristiidae
- Genus: Platyberyx; Zugmayer, 1911

Type species
- Platyberyx opalescens Zugmayer, 1911

= Platyberyx =

Genus of ray-finned fishes

Platyberyx is a genus of manefishes native to the eastern Atlantic Ocean.

== Species ==
There are currently five recognized species in this genus:

- Platyberyx mauli Kukuev, Parin & Trunov, 2012
- Platyberyx opalescens Zugmayer, 1911
- Platyberyx paucus D. E. Stevenson & Kenaley, 2013
- Platyberyx pietschi D. E. Stevenson & Kenaley, 2013
- Platyberyx rhyton D. E. Stevenson & Kenaley, 2013
