= Araeosteus =

Araeosteus Temporal range: Late Miocene

Scientific classification
- Kingdom: Animalia
- Phylum: Chordata
- Class: Actinopterygii
- Order: Perciformes
- Family: Zaproridae
- Genus: †Araeosteus; Jordan & Gilbert, 1920
- Species: †A. rothi

Binomial name
- †Araeosteus rothi Jordan & Gilbert, 1920

Extinct genus of fishes

Araeosteus is an extinct genus of marine ray-finned fish, closely related to the modern-day prowfish. It contains a single species, A. rothi which is known from Late Miocene (Tortonian)-aged marine strata in Southern California, primarily the Diatom Beds of Lompoc (Monterey Formation) and the Santa Monica Mountains (Modelo Formation).

== Etymology ==
The generic name is a compound word meaning "slender bone." The specific name honors one Almon Edward Roth of Stanford University.

== See also ==
- List of prehistoric bony fish
