= Chaenophryne melanorhabdus =

Conservation status
- Least Concern (IUCN 3.1)

Scientific classification
- Kingdom: Animalia
- Phylum: Chordata
- Class: Actinopterygii
- Order: Lophiiformes
- Family: Oneirodidae
- Genus: Chaenophryne
- Species: C. melanorhabdus

Binomial name
- Chaenophryne melanorhabdus Regan & Trewavas, 1932

Synonyms
- Chaenophryne pterolophus Regan & Trewavas, 1932

Species of fish

Chaenophryne melanorhabdus is a species of marine ray-finned fish belonging to the family Oneirodidae, the dreamers, a family of deep-sea anglerfishes. This predatory, deep-sea fish is found in the Pacific Ocean. Like other deep-sea anglerfishes, dreamers are sexually dimorphic, with the metamorphosed females dwarfing the metamorphosed males. The males are not sexual parasites.

== Taxonomy ==
Chaenophryne melanorhabdus was first formally described in 1932 by the British ichthyologists Charles Tate Regan and Ethelwynn Trewavas with its type locality given as the Gulf of Panama from 7°30'N, 79°19'W, Dana station 1203 from a depth of around 1,250 m (4,100 ft). The 5th edition of Fishes of the World classifies the genus Chaenophryne in the family Oneirodidae in the suborder Ceratioidei of the anglerfish order Lophiiformes.

== Etymology ==
Chaenophryne melanorhabdus belongs to the genus Chaenophryne, this name being a combination of chaeno, which means "gape", with phryne, meaning "toad". What this name alludes to was not explained by Regan, but the first part may refer to the wide mouth of C. longiceps. The second part is a suffix commonly used in the names of anglerfish genera. Its use for these fishes may date as far back as Aristotle and Cicero, who referred to anglerfishes as "fishing-frogs" and "sea-frogs", respectively, possibly because of their resemblance to frogs and toads. The specific name, melanorhabdus, is a combination of melanos, meaning "black", with rhabdos, which means "rod", a reference to the tentacle-like appendage on the bulb of the esca.

== Description ==
Chaenophryne melanorhabdus has between 6 and 8 soft rays on its dorsal fin and 5 or 6 in its anal fin. The metamorphosed females of this species are distinguished from other species in Chaenophryne by the possession of an esca which has a single anterior appendage which is elongated with internal pigmentation. This appendage varies in length from equivalent of less than a querter to almost a third of the length of the bulb of the esca. The rear appendages on the esca are swollen at their bases and compressed at their tips, while the rear filament or filaments and a pair of forward lobes each have a large number of filaments. There is also filamentous appendage on each side towards the front and there are no filaments at ite base of the esca. The total number of teeth in the upper jaw is 21 to 45 and 26 to 42 teeth in the lower jaw. The maximum published standard length of this species is 10.2 cm (4.0 in).

== Distribution and habitat ==
Chaenophryne melanorhabdus is known to occur in the Eastern Pacific Ocean from British Columbia south to Peru. Occurrences of this species in the Western Pacific, from Java, Sumatra and Hawaii may refer to an undescribed species. This is a bathypelagic fish found at depths as deep as 1,250 m (4,100 ft), although it is typically found between 300 and 1,000 m (980 and 3,280 ft).

== Biology ==
Chaenophryne melanorhabdus is oviparous. The eggs and larvae are pelagic and descend into deep water after they metamorphose into adults.
