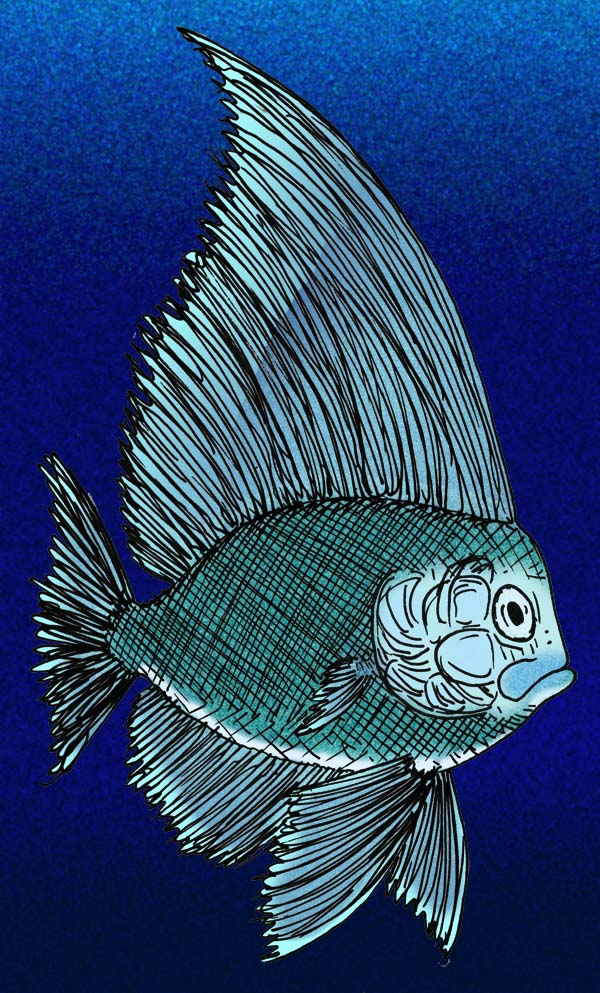

Scientific classification
- Kingdom: Animalia
- Phylum: Chordata
- Class: Actinopterygii
- Order: Scombriformes
- Family: Caristiidae
- Genus: †Absalomichthys; Whitley, 1933
- Species: †A. velifer

Binomial name
- †Absalomichthys velifer Whitley, 1933

= Absalomichthys =

Absalomichthys Temporal range: Upper Miocene

Extinct genus of fishes

Absalomichthys velifer is an extinct, prehistoric manefish that lived during the Upper Miocene of what is now Southern California in the United States. Its dorsal fin was huge in comparison with living species. It is known from the Modelo Formation of Los Angeles County.

== See also ==
- Prehistoric fish
- List of prehistoric bony fish
