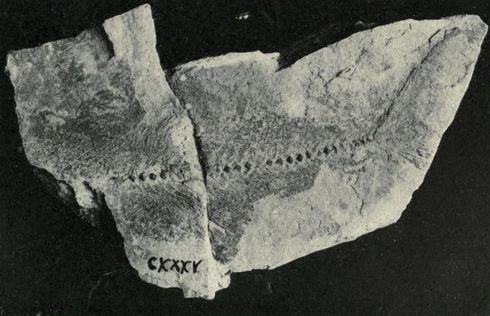
- Type specimen

Scientific classification
- Kingdom: Animalia
- Phylum: Chordata
- Class: Actinopterygii
- Order: Clupeiformes
- Family: Clupeidae
- Genus: †Alisea; Jordan and Gilbert, 1919
- Species: †A. grandis

Binomial name
- †Alisea grandis Jordan and Gilbert, 1919

= Alisea =

Alisea Temporal range: Upper Miocene

Extinct genus of fishes

Alisea is an extinct genus of prehistoric marine clupeiform fish that lived in what is now California during the Upper Miocene subepoch. Although generally considered a relative of the herrings in the family Clupeidae, an affinity to shads has also been suggested due to its large size and well-developed abdominal scutes. Its name derives from alise, an alternate spelling for the Hindi name of the related ilish fish.

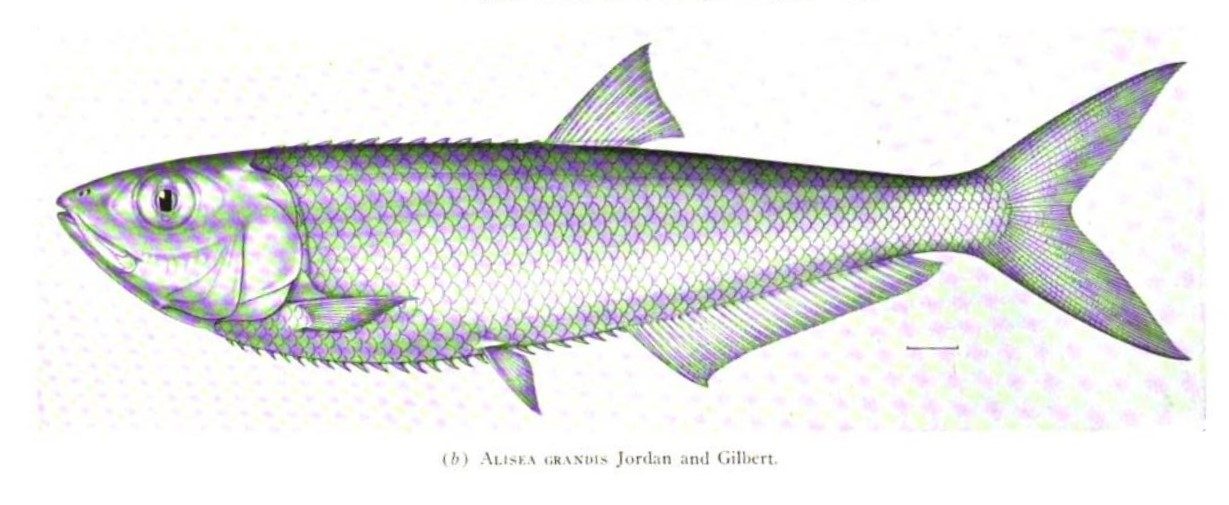
Life restoration

Due to the poorly preserved nature of the only specimen, it is uncertain whether it warrants recognition as a distinct taxon.
