= Austroclupea =

Austroclupea Temporal range: Pliocene

Scientific classification
- Kingdom: Animalia
- Phylum: Chordata
- Class: Actinopterygii
- Order: Clupeiformes
- Family: Clupeidae
- Genus: †Austroclupea; Bardack, 1961
- Species: †A. zuninoi

Binomial name
- †Austroclupea zuninoi Bardack, 1961

Extinct genus of fishes

Austroclupea is an extinct genus of freshwater ray-finned fish that lived during the Pliocene epoch. It contains a single species, A. zuninoi from Argentina. It was a relative of modern herring in the family Clupeidae.

It is one of the few Neogene freshwater fish genera from South America known to have gone extinct prior to modern times. Unlike many other freshwater fish of the region, it may have been uniquely vulnerable to the geological and climate events that affected the region during the Pleistocene.
