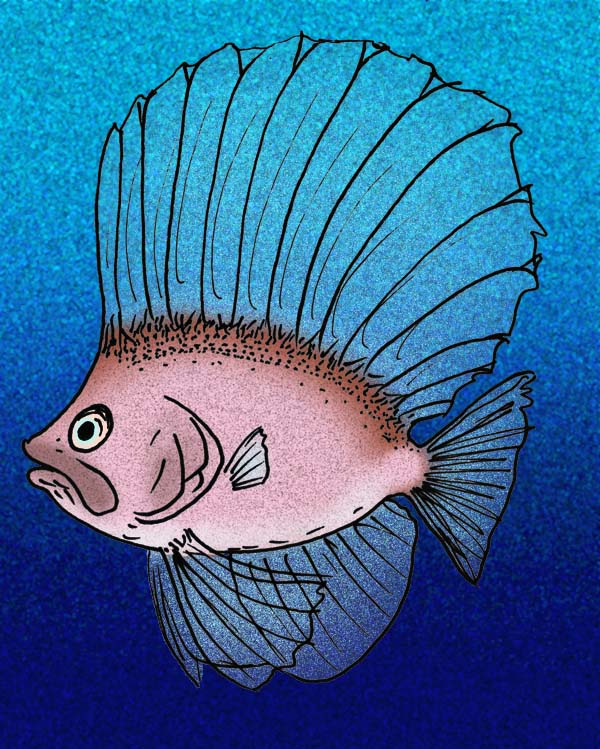

Scientific classification
- Kingdom: Animalia
- Phylum: Chordata
- Class: Actinopterygii
- Order: Scombriformes
- Family: Caristiidae
- Genus: †Chalcidichthys; David, 1943
- Species: †C. malacapterygius

Binomial name
- †Chalcidichthys malacapterygius David, 1943

= Chalcidichthys =

Chalcidichthys Temporal range: Upper Miocene

Extinct genus of fishes

Chalcidichthys is an extinct genus of prehistoric manefish. It contains a single species, C. malacapterygius, that lived during the Upper Miocene of Southern California. It is known from the Modelo Formation in Los Angeles County, and specimens were found during construction of a tunnel on Sepulveda Boulevard. It is assumed to have preyed on siphonophores, like its living relatives.

== See also ==
- Prehistoric fish
- List of prehistoric bony fish
