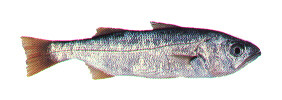

Conservation status
- Least Concern (IUCN 3.1)

Scientific classification
- Kingdom: Animalia
- Phylum: Chordata
- Class: Actinopterygii
- Order: Acanthuriformes
- Family: Sciaenidae
- Genus: Seriphus; Ayres, 1860
- Species: S. politus

Binomial name
- Seriphus politus Ayres, 1860

= Queenfish =

Queenfish Temporal range: Late Miocene–present

Species of fish

The queenfish (Seriphus politus) is a species of fish in the family Sciaenidae, the drums and croakers. It is native to the eastern Pacific Ocean, where it occurs along the North American coastline from Oregon to Baja California; it has been recorded as far north as British Columbia. Its centre of distribution is the Southern California Bight. It is also known commonly as the queen croaker. This is the only extant species in the monotypic genus Seriphus. A fossil relative, S. lavenbergi, is known from the Late Miocene-aged Puente Formation of the Los Angeles Basin.

== Description ==
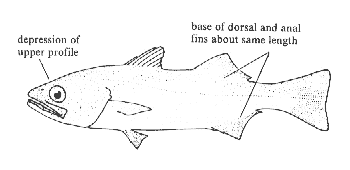
Distinguishing features

This species is up to 30 centimetres (12 in) long. It has an elongated, compressed body. It is blue-grey to tan in colour with a shiny silver belly and a dark horizontal line running the length of the body. The pectoral fin is dark and the other fins are yellowish. The mouth contains one or two rows of pointed teeth.

== Biology ==
This marine fish occurs in coastal waters, such as bays and sloughs, moving to deeper waters at night.

It feeds on marine invertebrates and small fish. It eats planktonic crustaceans such as copepods when it is a juvenile. Adults also feed on Californian anchovy (Engraulis mordax).

This species forms schools. It is prey for many kinds of larger fish, such as kelp bass (Paralabrax clathratus).

== Conservation ==
Little population information is available for this species, but it is not considered to be threatened.

This is a common sport fishing catch on Southern California fishing piers.
