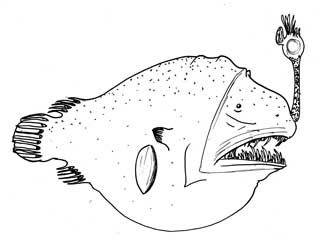
- C. longiceps

Scientific classification
- Kingdom: Animalia
- Phylum: Chordata
- Class: Actinopterygii
- Order: Lophiiformes
- Family: Oneirodidae
- Genus: Chaenophryne; Regan, 1925

Type species
- Chaenophryne longiceps Regan, 1925

= Chaenophryne =

Genus of fishes

Chaenophryne is a genus of marine ray-finned fish belonging to the family Oneirodidae, the dreamers, a family of deep-sea anglerfishes. These predatory, deep-sea fishes are found in the tropical and subtropical oceans around the world. Like other deep-sea anglerfishes, they are sexually dimorphic, with the matamorphosed females dwarfing the metamorphosed males. The males are not sexual parasites.

== Taxonomy ==
Chaenophryne was first proposed as a monospecific genus in 1925 by the British ichthyologist Charles Tate Regan when he described Chaenophryne longiceps, giving its type locality as 7°30'N, 79°19'W, off the Gulf of Panama at a depth of 1,500 m (4,900 ft). The 5th edition of Fishes of the World classifies this genus in the family Oneirodidae in the suborder Ceratioidei of the anglerfish order Lophiiformes.

== Etymology ==
Chaenophryne is a combination of chaeno, which means "gape", with phryne, meaning "toad". What this name alludes to was not explained by Regan but the first part may refer to the wide mouth of C. longiceps. The second part is a suffix commonly used in the names of anglerfish genera. Its use for these fishes may date as far back as Aristotle and Cicero, who referred to anglerfishes as "fishing-frogs" and "sea-frogs", respectively, possibly because of their resemblance to frogs and toads.

== Species ==
Chaenophryne has five recognized species classified within it:

- Chaenophryne draco Beebe, 1932 (Smooth-headed dreamer)
- Chaenophryne longiceps Regan, 1925 (Can-opener smooth-headed dreamer)
- Chaenophryne melanorhabdus Regan & Trewavas, 1932
- Chaenophryne quasiramifera Pietsch, 2007
- Chaenophryne ramifera Regan & Trewavas, 1932

== Characteristics ==
Chaenophryne dreamers are, like other deep sea anglerfishes, sexually dimorphic, and both the metamorphosed males and females are distinguished from other genera of Oneirodidae by the long and slender suboperculum, which has a tapering point at its upper end, and by having a slightly concave rear edge to the operculum. The metamorphosed females do not have any sphenotic spines, although there are blunt ridges on the parietal and post-temporal bones. The rear edge of the frontal bone is highly curved. They have pigmented skin which clearly extends past the base of the caudal fin. They have a pigmented snout, the rear nostril is separate from the eye, and there are 17-27 teeth on the lower denticular. The largest species in the genus is C. longiceps with a maximum published standard length of 24.5 cm (9.6 in), while the smallest is C. ramifera with a maximum published standard length of 9.6 cm (3.8 in).

== Distribution and habitat ==
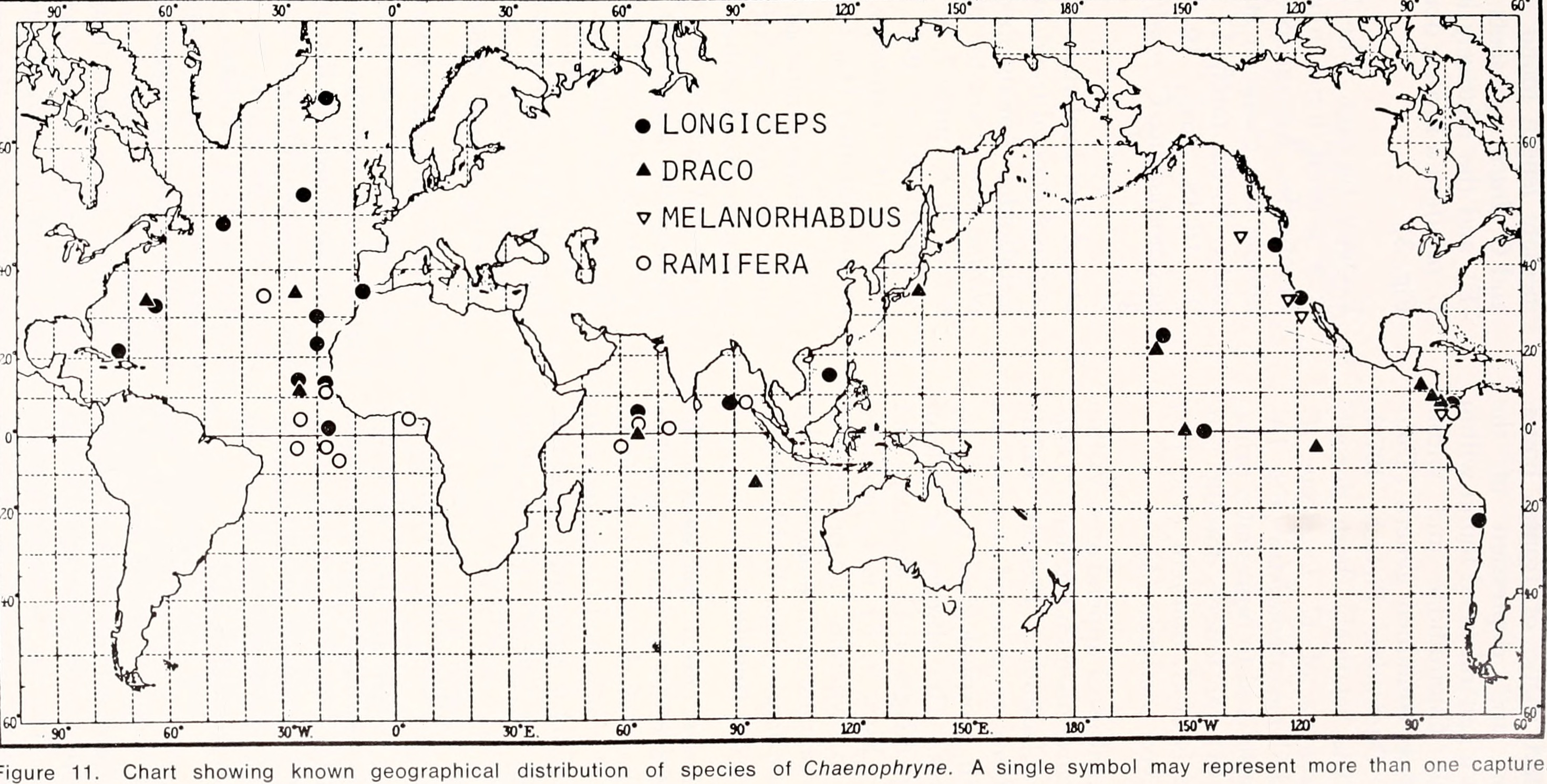
1977 map of Chaenophryne species, before the discovery of C. quasiramifera.

Chaenophryne dreamers are found in subtropical and tropical waters in the Atlantic, Indian and Pacific Oceans. They are found in the bathypelagic zone at depths between 350 and 1,750 m (1,150 and 5,740 ft).

== Biology ==
Chaenophryne dreamers are predatory, feeding on fishes, cephalopods and crustaceans. The males are dwarfed compared to the females but are non-parasitic.
