= Pico Formation =

Geologic formation in California, US

- Stratigraphic range: Late Pliocene to early Pleistocene, 3.6–1.8 Ma
- Type: Geologic formation
- Unit of: Los Angeles Basin
- Underlies: Saugus Formation
- Overlies: Repetto Formation. Sisquoc Formation

Location
- Region: Los Angeles Basin, Santa Monica Mountains; Los Angeles County, California
- Country: United States

The Pico Formation is a Pliocene epoch stratigraphic unit and geologic formation in the greater Los Angeles Basin, the Santa Monica Mountains, and the Santa Susana Mountains, in Los Angeles County of Southern California.

Some literature considers the Pico Formation and the adjacent, older Repetto Formation to be a single formation called the Fernando Formation.

== Geology ==
It was formed during the Neogene period of the Cenozoic Era, and overlies the Repetto Formation.

Outcrops of the formation in Santa Monica Mountains National Recreation Area have produced fossil shark teeth from the Pliocene.

In addition to fossils, armored mud balls were found by Cartwright (1928) in possible fluvial or coastal deposits of the Pico Formation, though they were referred to as "pudding balls" in the article.

=== Classification ===
The underlying Repetto Formation is equivalent in age to the Fernando Formation, and some researchers consider it as well as the overlying Pico Formation to be a junior synonym based on benthic foraminifera stages. Other researchers maintain that the Repetto and Pico Formations are distinct stratigraphic units, and that the use of the name "Fernando Formation" should be stopped due to several issues with stratigraphic correlation and access to the type section.

== See also ==
- Geology of Los Angeles County, California
