= Philippe Brood =

Dutch politician (1964–2000)

Member of the House of Representatives
- In office 25 August 1998 – 13 April 2000

Personal details
- Born: Philippe Gérard Brood; 20 July 1964 The Hague, Netherlands
- Died: 13 April 2000 (aged 35) The Hague, Netherlands
- Party: People's Party for Freedom and Democracy
- Education: Leiden University (Master of Laws)
- Occupation: Politician; Jurist; Consultant; Lecturer

Philippe Gérard Brood (20 July 1964 – 13 April 2000) was a Dutch politician of the People's Party for Freedom and Democracy (VVD). He served as a Member of the House of Representatives from 25 August 1998 until his death from a heart attack on 13 April 2000 in his office in the House of Representatives at the age of thirty-five.

Administrative law
