= Repetto Formation =

Geological formation in Southern California, United States

- Stratigraphic range: Early Pliocene, 5.33–3.60 Ma
- Type: Geologic formation
- Unit of: Los Angeles Basin
- Underlies: Pico Formation
- Overlies: Puente Formation

Location
- Region: Los Angeles Basin; Los Angeles County, California
- Country: United States

The Repetto Formation is a Pliocene epoch sedimentary unit in the greater Los Angeles Basin composed primarily of sandstone and conglomerate.

Some literature considers the Repetto Formation and the adjacent, younger Pico Formation to be a single formation called the Fernando Formation.

== Geology ==
The unit records deposition of a submarine fan environment at lower bathyal depths, and is recognized as a productive petroleum reservoir.

The formation underlies the Pico Formation, both of the Neogene period. It overlies the Miocene-aged Puente Formation.

=== Classification ===
The Repetto Formation is equivalent in age to the Fernando Formation; some researchers consider it (as well as the overlying Pico Formation) to be a junior synonym based on benthic foraminifera stages. Other researchers maintain that the Repetto and Pico Formations are distinct stratigraphic units, and that the use of the name "Fernando Formation" should be stopped due to several issues with stratigraphic correlation and access to the type section.

== See also ==
- Geology of Los Angeles County, California
- List of fossiliferous stratigraphic units in California
