= Quisque =

Quisque Temporal range: Upper Miocene

Scientific classification
- Domain: Eukaryota
- Kingdom: Animalia
- Phylum: Chordata
- Class: Actinopterygii
- Order: Clupeiformes
- Family: Clupeidae
- Subfamily: Clupeinae
- Genus: †Quisque; Jordan, 1920

Extinct genus of prehistoric herrings

Quisque is an extinct genus of prehistoric herring that lived during the Upper Miocene subepoch. At least two species are known, Q. gilberti, from what is now Southern California, and Q. bakeri, from what is now Texas.
