= Fernando Formation =

Formation in California, United States

- Stratigraphic range: Plio-Pleistocene
- Type: Geologic formation
- Underlies: Pico Formation
- Overlies: Repetto Formation

Lithology
- Primary: Mudstone, siltstone, sandstone

Location
- Region: Los Angeles Basin, Santa Monica Mountains; Los Angeles County, California
- Country: United States

The Fernando Formation is a Plio-Pleistocene marine mudstone, siltstone and sandstone formation in the greater Los Angeles Basin, Ventura Basin, and Santa Monica Mountains, in Los Angeles County of Southern California.

Some literature recognizes two separate formations in place of the Fernando Formation: the older Repetto Formation and younger Pico Formation.

== Geology ==
Outcrops of the formation in Santa Monica Mountains National Recreation Area have produced fossil shark teeth.

=== Classification ===
The underlying Repetto Formation is equivalent in age to the Fernando Formation, and some researchers consider it as well as the overlying Pico Formation to be a junior synonym based on benthic foraminifera stages. Other researchers maintain that the Repetto and Pico Formations are distinct stratigraphic units, and that the use of the name "Fernando Formation" should be stopped due to several issues with stratigraphic correlation and access to the type section.

== See also ==
- Geology of Los Angeles County, California
