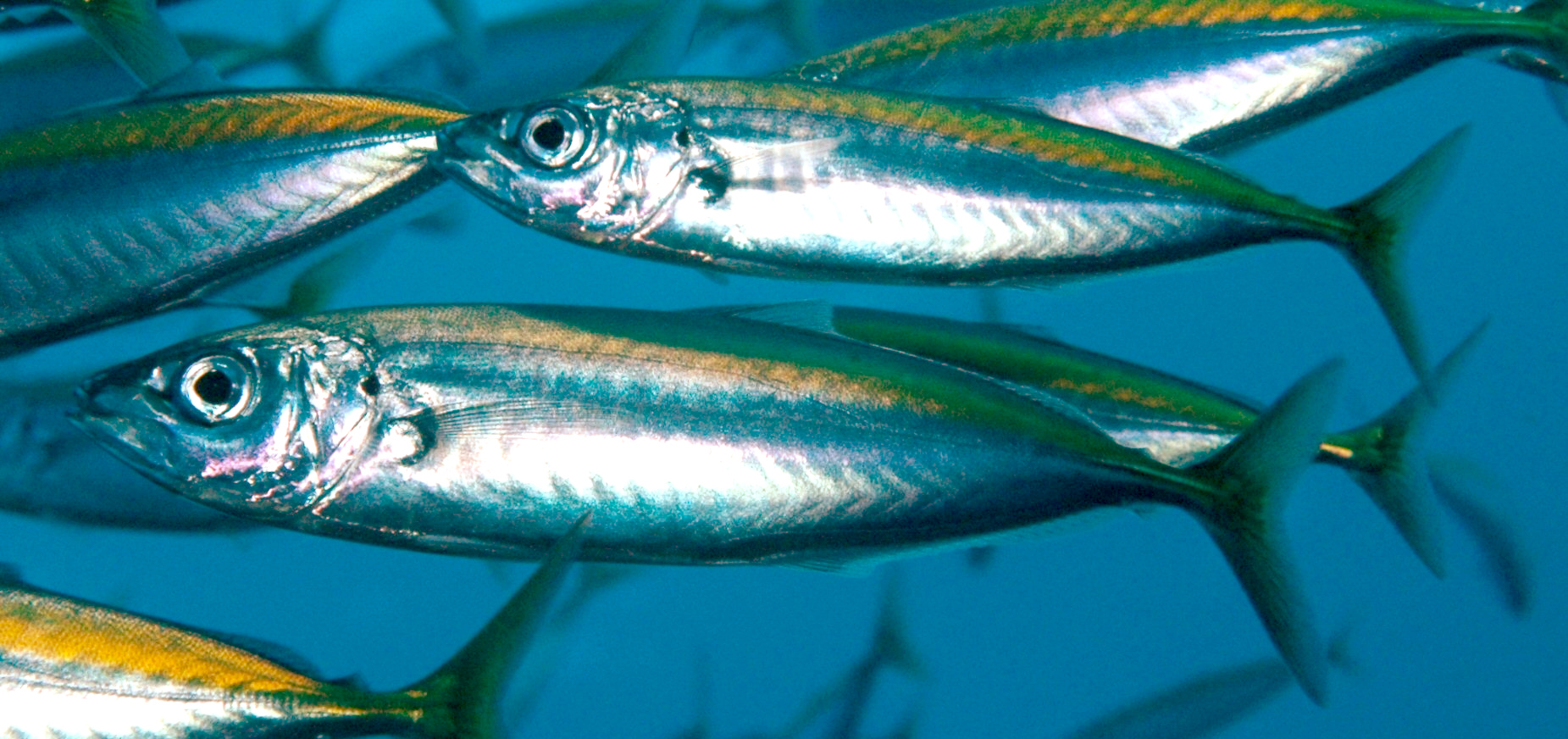
- Koheru - D. koheru

Scientific classification
- Kingdom: Animalia
- Phylum: Chordata
- Class: Actinopterygii
- Order: Carangiformes
- Suborder: Carangoidei
- Family: Carangidae
- Subfamily: Caranginae
- Genus: Decapterus; Bleeker, 1851

Type species
- Caranx kurra G. Cuvier, 1833

Synonyms
- Eustomatodus T. N. Gill, 1862; Evepigymnus T. N. Gill, 1862; Gymnepignathus T. N. Gill, 1862

= Decapterus =

Decapterus Temporal range: Late Oligocene–present

Genus of fishes

Decapterus is a genus of marine fishes of jack family, Carangidae, commonly known as mackerel scads, round scads, or horse mackerel. They are found throughout the world.

== Species ==
Currently, there are 11 recognized species:

- Decapterus akaadsi T. Abe, 1958
- Decapterus koheru (Hector, 1875) (koheru)
- Decapterus kurroides Bleeker, 1855 (redtail scad)
- Decapterus macarellus (G. Cuvier, 1833) (mackerel scad)
- Decapterus macrosoma Bleeker, 1851 (shortfin scad)
- Decapterus maruadsi (Temminck & Schlegel, 1843) (Japanese scad)
- Decapterus muroadsi (Temminck & Schlegel, 1844) (amberstripe scad)
- Decapterus punctatus (G. Cuvier, 1829) (round scad)
- Decapterus russelli (Rüppell, 1830) (Indian scad)
- Decapterus smithvanizi Kimura, Katahira & Kuriiwa, 2013
- Decapterus tabl Berry, 1968 (roughear scad)

The following fossil species are also known:

- †Decapterus abbreviatus (Bogachev, 1933) (Early Miocene of Crimea, Ukraine)
- †Decapterus boeckhi (Kramberger, 1902) (Middle Miocene of Hungary)
- †Decapterus fusiformis Bannikov, 1996 (Early Miocene of North Caucasus, Russia)
- †Decapterus hopkinsi (Jordan & Gilbert, 1920) (Late Miocene of California, USA)
- †Decapterus praegracilis Bannikov, 1990 (Early Miocene of North Caucasus, Russia)
- †?Decapterus mizoramiensis Tiwari & Bannikov, 2001 (Early Miocene of Mizoram, India)
- †Decapterus prorusselli Arambourg, 1927 (Late Miocene of Algeria)
- †Decapterus rigidicaudus (Heckel, 1854) (Late Oligocene or Early Miocene of Italy)
