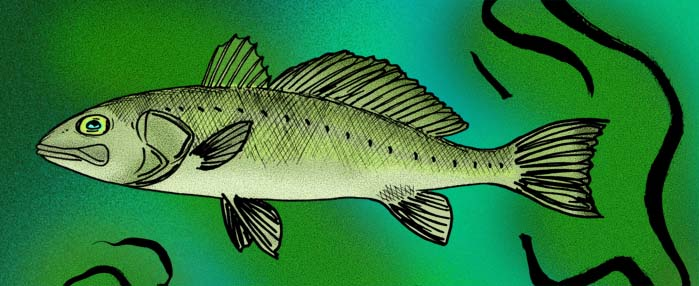
- Artist's reconstruction

Scientific classification
- Kingdom: Animalia
- Phylum: Chordata
- Class: Actinopterygii
- Order: Acanthuriformes
- Family: Sciaenidae
- Genus: †Lompoquia; Jordan & Gilbert, 1919

= Lompoquia =

Lompoquia Temporal range: Upper Miocene

Extinct genus of fishes

Lompoquia retropes is an extinct genus of ray-finned fishes belonging to the family Sciaenidae, the drums. These fishes lived what is now Southern California during the Upper Miocene subepoch.

== Species ==
Two species are classified within this genus:

- †Lompoquia culveri Jordan 1925
- †Lompoquia retropes Jordan and Gilbert 1919

† means extinct

== See also ==
- Prehistoric fish
- List of prehistoric bony fish
