= Ganolytes =

Ganolytes Temporal range: Upper Miocene (Tortonian)

Scientific classification
- Kingdom: Animalia
- Phylum: Chordata
- Class: Actinopterygii
- Order: Clupeiformes
- Genus: †Ganolytes; Jordan, 1919

Species
- G. aratus (Jordan, 1924); G. cameo Jordan, 1919

Extinct genus of fishes

Ganoessus is an extinct genus of prehistoric marine herring that inhabited the coast of western North America during the Miocene. It contains two species, both known from the Upper Miocene of California, US.

The following species are known:

- †G. aratus (Jordan, 1924) - Late Miocene of Monterey and Modelo Formations
- †G. cameo Jordan, 1919 - Late Miocene of the Modelo Formation

It was a relatively large fish with thick, enameled scales. Its morphology may potentially suggest a relationship to the Alosidae, but this is uncertain.
