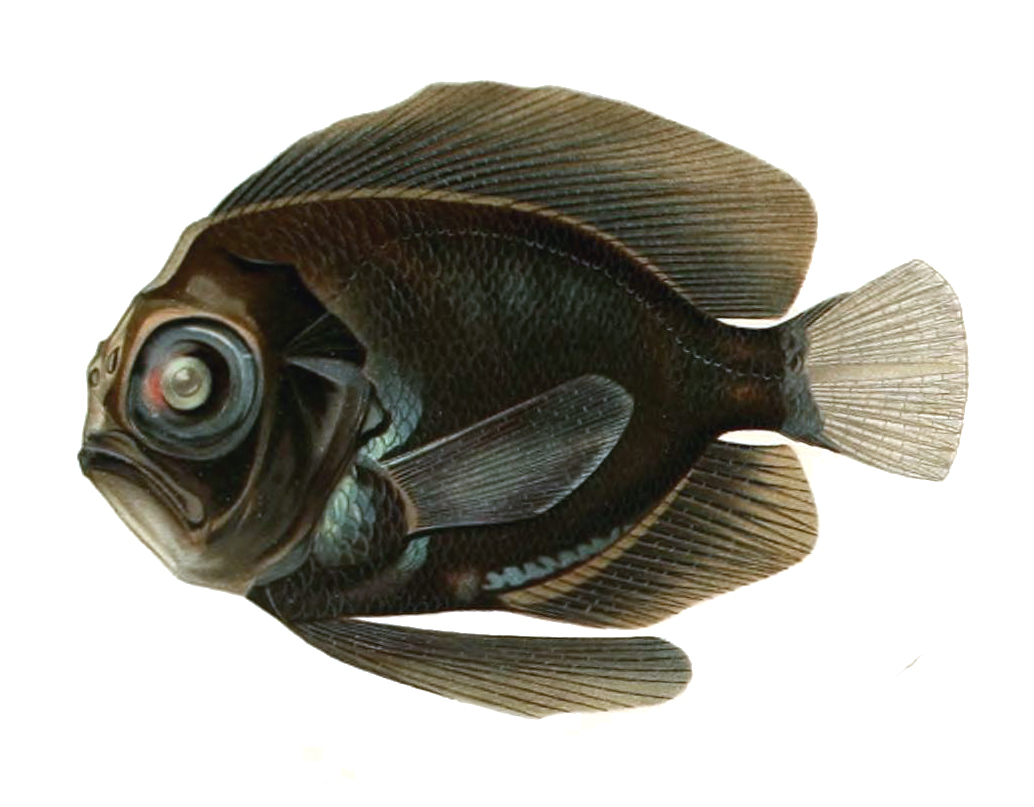
- Platyberyx opalescens

Scientific classification
- Kingdom: Animalia
- Phylum: Chordata
- Class: Actinopterygii
- Order: Scombriformes
- Suborder: Scombroidei
- Family: Caristiidae; T. N. Gill & H. M. Smith, 1905

Genera
- Caristius; Neocaristius; Paracaristius; Platyberyx; †Absalomichthys; †Chalcidichthys

= Caristiidae =

Caristiidae Temporal range: Late Miocene–present

Family of ray-finned fishes

Caristiidae, the manefishes, are a family of scombriform ray-finned fishes which today includes 19 extant species distributed in four genera.

== Taxonomy ==
The following genera are known:

- Caristius Gill & Smith, 1905
- Neocaristius Stevenson & Kenaley, 2011
- Paracaristius Trunov, Kukuev & Parin, 2006
- Platyberyx Zugmayer, 1911

In addition, the extinct genera Chalcidichthys and Absalomichthys are known from the Late Miocene of Southern California.

== Biology ==
They are deep-sea marine fishes found in the mesopelagic zone that eat siphonophores. An adult manefish is less than 25 cm in length and most of them are entirely black, which helps camouflage them from predators.
