= Xyne =

Xyne Temporal range: Upper Miocene

Scientific classification
- Domain: Eukaryota
- Kingdom: Animalia
- Phylum: Chordata
- Class: Actinopterygii
- Order: Clupeiformes
- Family: Clupeidae
- Genus: †Xyne; Gilbert, 1919
- Species: †X. grex

Binomial name
- †Xyne grex Gilbert, 1919

Synonyms
- (Species): Xyne fitgeri Jordan & Gilbert, 1920

Extinct genus of fishes

Xyne is an extinct genus of prehistoric herring that lived during the Upper Miocene subepoch. Fossils are known from the Dicalite Quarry and Diatom Hill in California.

== See also ==
- Prehistoric fish
- List of prehistoric bony fish
