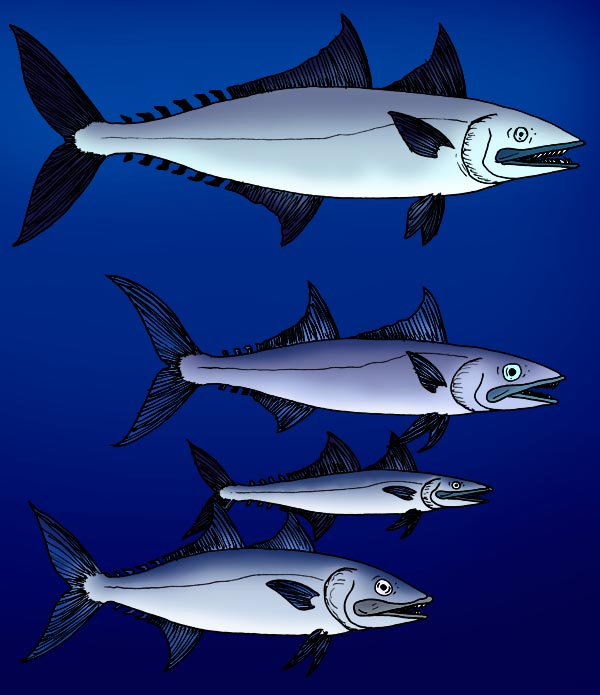

Scientific classification
- Kingdom: Animalia
- Phylum: Chordata
- Class: Actinopterygii
- Order: Scombriformes
- Family: †Euzaphlegidae
- Genus: †Thyrsocles; Jordan & Gilbert, 1920

Synonyms
- †Deprandus Jordan & Gilbert, 1921

= Thyrsocles =

Thyrsocles Temporal range: Upper Miocene

Extinct genus of fishes

Thyrsocles is an extinct genus of prehistoric bony fish that lived during the Upper Miocene subepoch.

The genus Deprandus from California, which was previously thought to be an extinct eel and the only member of the family Deprandidae, is now thought to be an incorrectly identified specimen of T. velox.

== See also ==
- Prehistoric fish
- List of prehistoric bony fish
