= Long Beach Oil Field =

Large oil field underneath cities of California, United States

Coordinates: 33.8079°N 118.1765°W

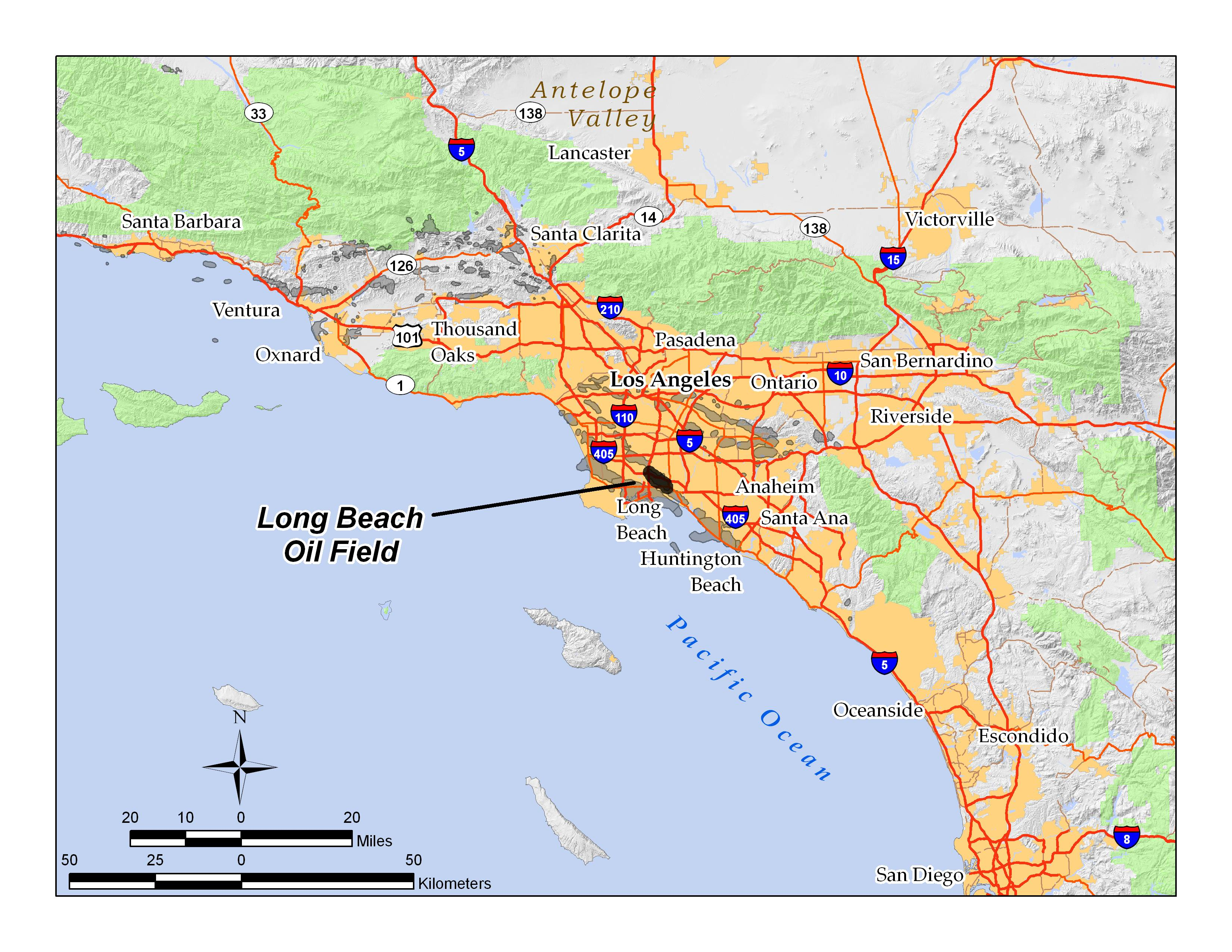
Location of the Long Beach Oil Field in the context of the Los Angeles Basin and Southern California. Other oil fields are shown in dark gray.

The Long Beach Oil Field is a large oil field underneath the cities of Long Beach and Signal Hill, California, in the United States. Discovered in 1921, the field was enormously productive in the 1920s, with hundreds of oil derricks covering Signal Hill and adjacent parts of Long Beach; largely due to the huge output of this field, the Los Angeles Basin produced one-fifth of the nation's oil supply during the early 1920s. In 1923 alone the field produced over 68 million barrels of oil, and in barrels produced by surface area, the field was the world's richest. During the early stages of the field's development, unlike most oil fields, land was leased by the square inch instead of by the acre. The field is eighth-largest by cumulative production in California, and although now largely depleted, still officially retains around 5 million barrels of recoverable oil and has produced 963 million out of 3,600 million barrels of original oil in place. 294 wells remained in operation as of the beginning of 2008, and in 2008 the field reported production of over 1.5 million barrels of oil. The field is currently run entirely by small independent oil companies, with the largest operator in 2009 being Signal Hill Petroleum, Inc.

== Setting ==
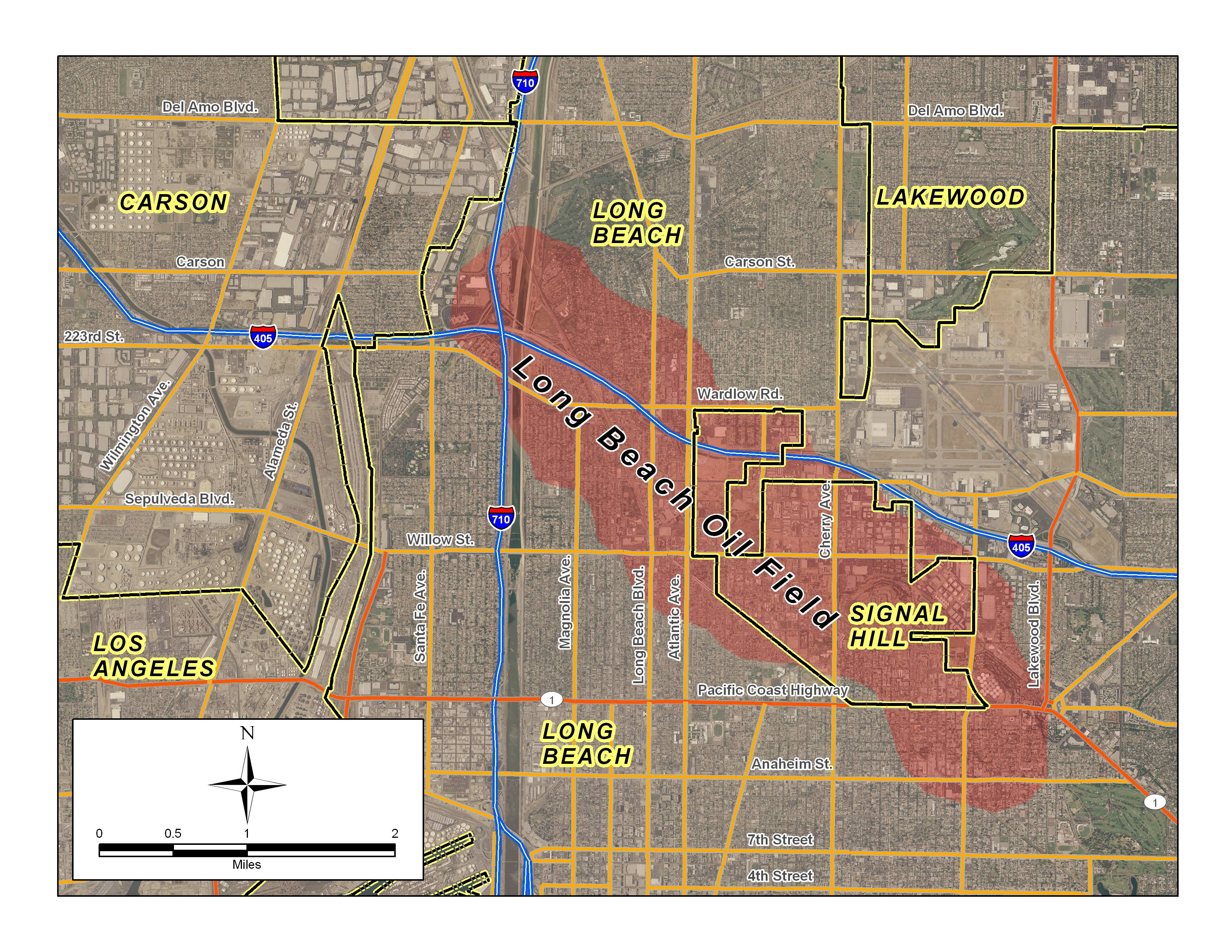
Detail of the Long Beach field, on an aerial photograph base, showing its position within Long Beach and surrounding communities.

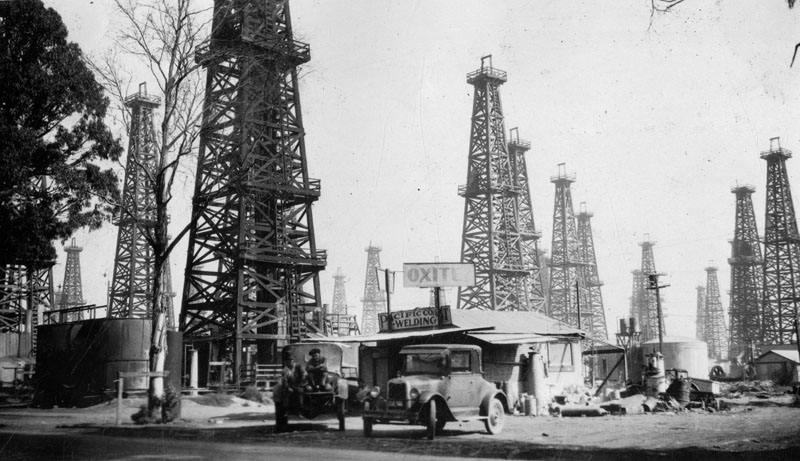
Signal Hill oil field in 1926

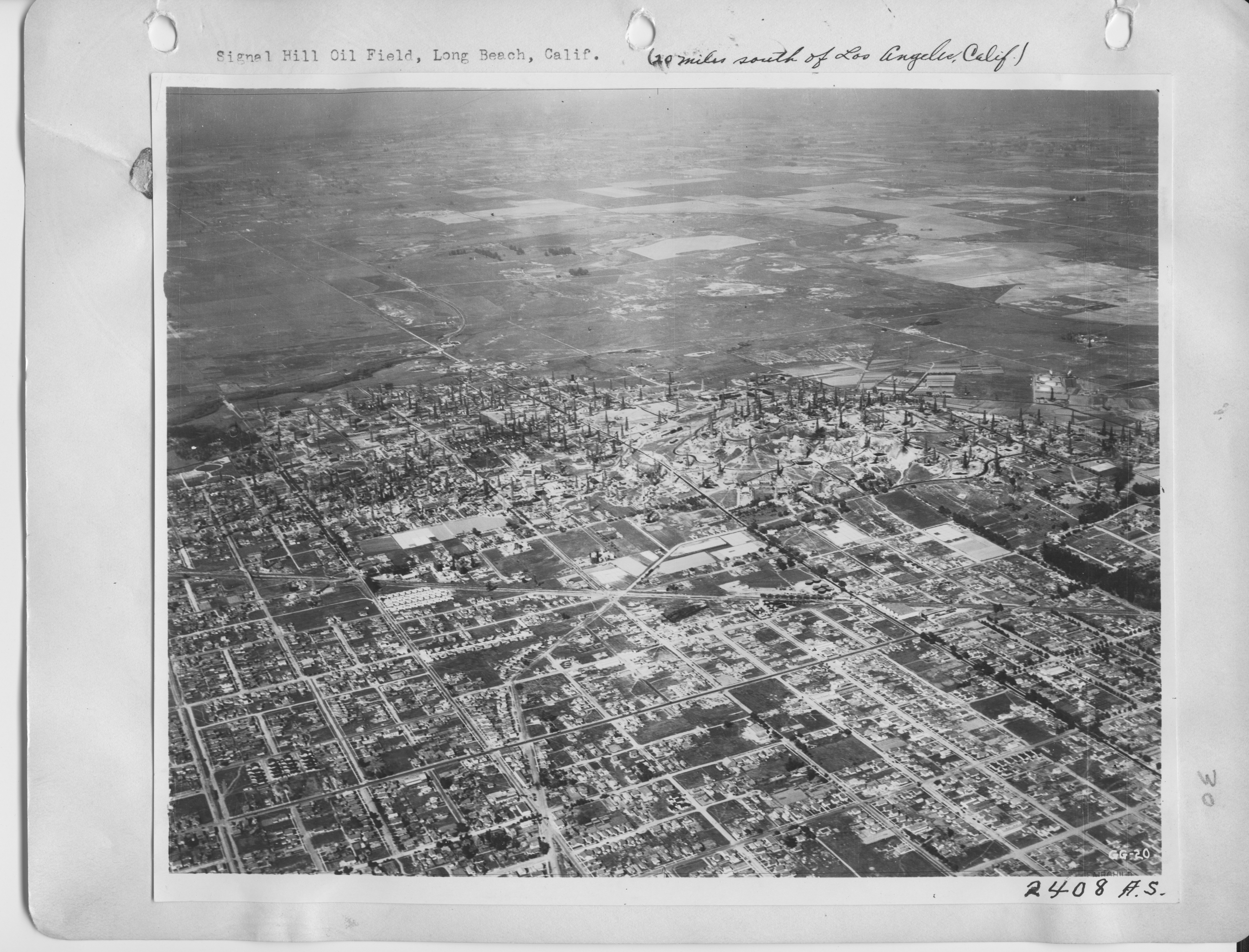
Signal Hill oil field, c. 1941-1947

The Long Beach field is one of many in the Los Angeles Basin now largely overbuilt with dense urban development. Even with the dramatic land use changes over the decades since its discovery, it remains moderately productive, with oil wells and oilfield infrastructure intermixed with commercial and residential development. The field underlies the northern portion of the city of Long Beach and most of the city of Signal Hill. In spite of its name, most of the productive area of the field underlies the small city of Signal Hill, which has a population of around 11,000. The main productive area of the field runs from northwest to southeast, about five miles (8 km) long by one across, with the long axis following the Cherry Hill Fault Zone, which is part of the larger Newport–Inglewood Fault Zone, the most significant fault zone traversing the Los Angeles Basin. In the northwest, the oil field begins approximately near the junction of the San Diego Freeway (I-405) and the 710 (the Long Beach Freeway), and proceeds roughly paralleling the 405 freeway to near the intersection of Lakewood Boulevard and California State Route 1 (the Pacific Coast Highway) at their traffic circle in Long Beach. A small portion of the field, no longer productive, is in the city of Lakewood, and another small isolated part of the field, the "Recreation Park Area", lies to the southeast of the main field. The total productive area of the entire field is 1,725 acres (6.98 km^{2}).

Unlike some of the oil fields in downtown Los Angeles, the adjacent Mid-City area, and Beverly Hills, which hide their oil wells inside soundproofed, windowless enclosures, attempting to be as invisible as possible, most of the wells in the Long Beach field use normal above-ground pumpjacks, sometimes behind walls or inside of fenced enclosures, but also scattered through the community in parking lots, in freeway cloverleaf medians, vacant lots, and other empty spaces. Typically, residential structures are not immediately adjacent to wells. Also differentiating this field from the completely urbanized oil fields nearer to downtown, most wells are drilled vertically rather than directionally from drilling enclosures.

Climate in the area is Mediterranean, with cool rainy winters and mild summers, with the heat moderated by morning fog and low clouds. Drainage is by municipal storm drains into the Los Angeles River to the west, and the San Gabriel River to the east, both of which flow south into San Pedro Bay in the Pacific Ocean. As the area is largely urbanized, few areas of native vegetation and wildlife habitat remain.

== Geology ==
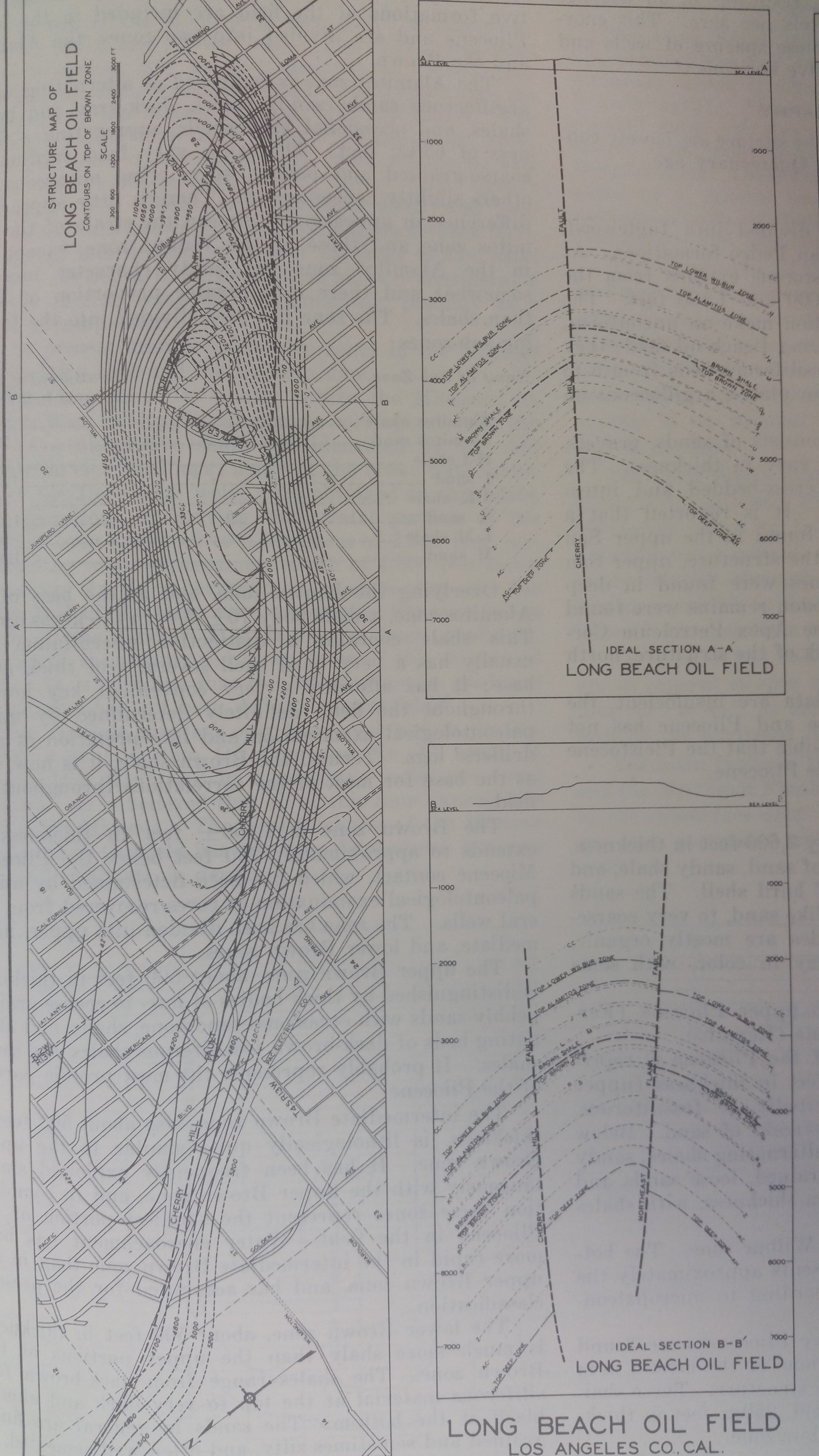
Long Beach Oil Field Structure Map

The Long Beach field is one of many prolific oil fields along the Newport–Inglewood Fault, which includes the enormous Huntington Beach Oil Field on the south, the Seal Beach Oil Field, the Long Beach field, and to the northwest of that the Dominguez, Rosecrans, and Inglewood fields.

The main portion of the Long Beach field is an anticlinal structure paralleling the fault zone, with Signal Hill being its surface expression. Oil, which rises to the surface unless something is in the way, is trapped underneath impermeable units, in a series of oil bearing formations alternating with impermeable ones, like layers on a cake, but folded to form a long, narrow hill. The Long Beach field is notable for the thickness and depth of its oil-bearing formations; successively deeper wells continued to find oil even as late as the 1950s, with the deepest well finally hitting the basement rocks of the Catalina Schist at 14,950 feet (4,560 m) below ground surface.

Within the main area of the Long Beach field, seven separate pools have been defined, ranging in depth from around 2,000 feet (610 m) to over 7,500 feet (2,300 m). The thickness of the oil-bearing units was extraordinary, and largely accounted for the field's unusual standing as being the richest field by oil extracted per acre in the world, at least in the 1920s and 1930s. Primary productive geologic units in the field are the Pliocene-age Repetto Formation and the Miocene Puente Formation. Both of these porous units are richly oil-bearing elsewhere in the Los Angeles Basin as well, anywhere that oil can collect due to a combination of stratigraphic and structural traps.

Oil from the Long Beach field tends to be medium- to heavy-grade, with API gravity ranging from 14 to 30, and sulfur content relatively high at 2 to 3 percent by weight.

== History, production, and operations ==
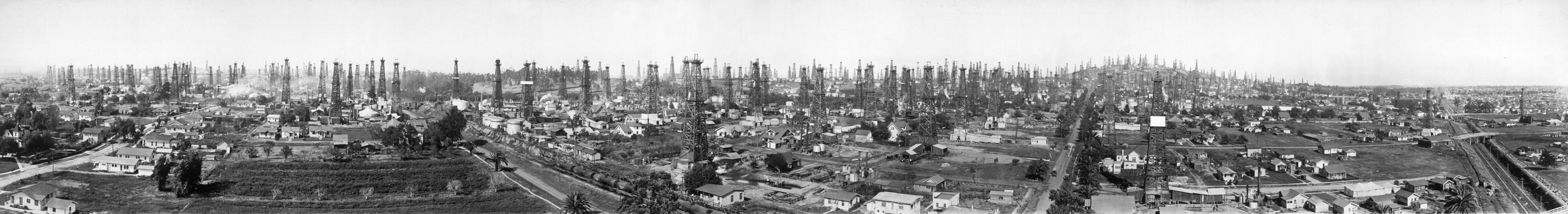
Signal Hill c1923

Oil was known in the Los Angeles basin since prehistoric times, as the La Brea Tar Pits are a surface expression of the Salt Lake Oil Field; crude oil seeps to the surface along a fault, biodegrading to asphalt. The native inhabitants of the region used the tar for many purposes, including as a sealant, and the first European settlers found similar uses. In the mid-19th century, oil had become a valuable commodity as an energy source, commencing a period of exploration and discovery for the sources of the substance. By the 1890s, prospectors were drilling for oil in the basin, and in 1893 the first large field – the Los Angeles City Oil Field, adjacent and underneath the then-small city of Los Angeles – became the largest oil producer in the state. Oil companies began finding other rich fields not far away, such as the Beverly Hills and Salt Lake fields. Attention shifted to Kern County in the first two decades of the 20th century, as the super-giant fields there were discovered one at a time.

The Long Beach field was one of several significant oil discoveries in the Los Angeles basin and adjoining area in the 1920s, and by far the most productive. In 1920 drillers found the Huntington Beach field; in 1921 both the Santa Fe Springs field and the Long Beach field; and the others along the Newport–Inglewood Fault zone followed quickly after, with the Dominguez field in 1923, and the Inglewood and Rosecrans fields in 1924. When the discovery well was drilled, the Signal Hill area was already being developed with residences, as the hill offered a commanding view of the harbor area to the south. Initially, the Shell Oil geologists opposed drilling on the hill, as competitor Union Oil had tried and failed to find oil there just four years earlier, and they were unwilling to risk a repeat of the series of costly failures that had plagued them recently at the Ventura field. Yet the discovery well, Alamitos oil well No. 1 (now a historical landmark at the corner of East Hill Street and Temple Ave.) blew in as a tremendous gusher on June 25, 1921.

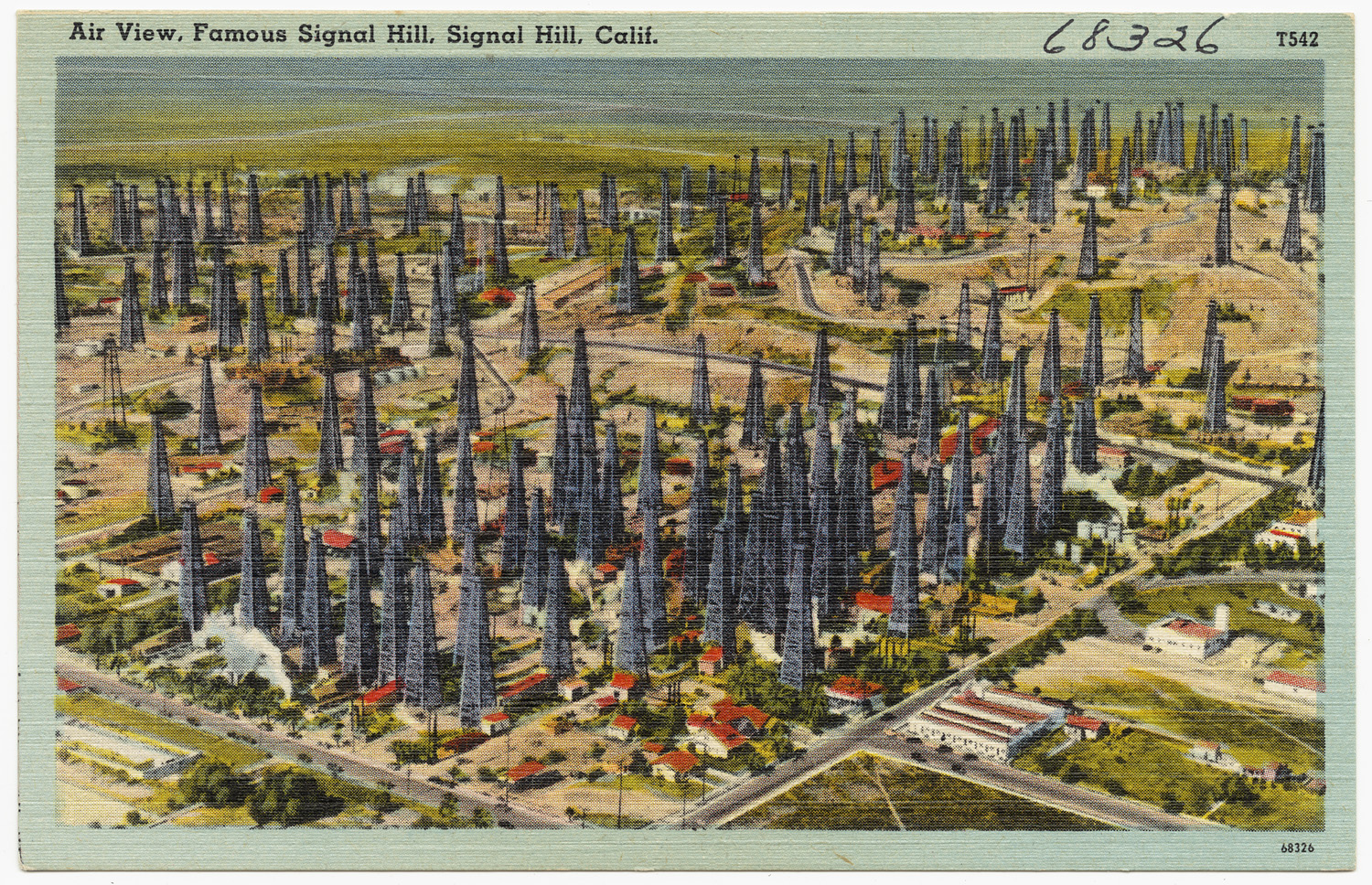
Signal Hill view in the 1930s, postcard

In the 1920s there were few regulations on well spacing, and Signal Hill sold narrow town lots which were quickly bought up by would-be oil millionaires, who put in wells that were virtually touching each other; in spite of this close spacing, most were profitable, although they drained the field quickly. Signal Hill became known as "Porcupine Hill" for its prickly appearance at a distance, covered with hundreds of wooden oil derricks (the low "nodding-donkey" pumpjack was yet to be invented). By 1923 the production from the field had become so abundant that oil from the Los Angeles Basin accounted for fully twenty percent of the entire world output. 1923 was the peak year for production from the field, and that also coincided with the peak for production from the entire Los Angeles basin; in spite of large discoveries in the 1930s, including the nearby Wilmington field, fourth-largest in the nation, production never again attained that level. The price of oil had risen steeply, from $0.64/barrel in 1916 to $3.07 in 1920, largely because of the enormous increase in the number of automobiles on the roads – during that time the number of cars had tripled.

Production slowed during the Great Depression, as the price of oil dropped with the demand, and the discovery of huge new fields not only in the Los Angeles Basin, but in Oklahoma and Texas, put a glut of petroleum on the market.

By 1950 the field was third in the United States in overall output, with a cumulative production of 750 million barrels of oil. Ahead of it were only the giant East Texas and Midway-Sunset fields. As production began to decline, and the technology became available, several waterflooding programs began, with the first in 1964 in the "Brown" horizon of the Repetto Formation. The goal was both to increase the flow of oil to production wells, and to replace the fluids pumped out of the reservoir in order to prevent subsidence, such as had occurred over the Wilmington field to the south.

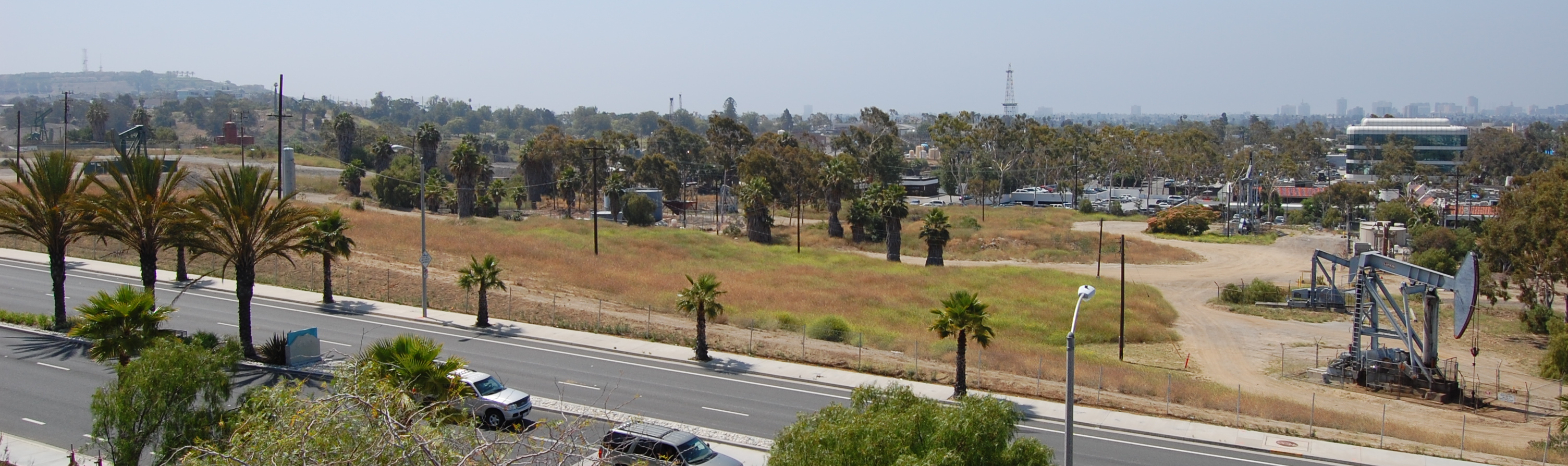
Long Beach Oil Field in 2011.

In the 1980s and 1990s, Barto Enterprises, the ancestor of Signal Hill Petroleum, acquired many of the local assets of the large oil companies – ARCO, Unocal, Shell, Mobil, Texaco, and others – that had previously been major operators on the Long Beach field (most of the majors moved out of the Los Angeles Basin during that time, seeking easier opportunities elsewhere; most present-day operators are small to medium-sized independents). As of 2009, Signal Hill Petroleum operated more than 90% of the wells on the field, as well as several enhanced recovery projects, including the waterflooding program.

== See also ==
- Inglewood Oil Field
- Signal Hill, California has additional information on the early history of the oil field
