= Los Angeles Basin =

Sedimentary basin located along the coast of southern California

The Los Angeles Basin is a sedimentary basin located in Southern California, in a region known as the Peninsular Ranges. The basin is also connected to an anomalous group of east–west trending chains of mountains collectively known as the Transverse Ranges. The present basin is a coastal lowland area, whose floor is marked by elongate low ridges and groups of hills that is located on the edge of the Pacific plate. The Los Angeles Basin, along with the Santa Barbara Channel, the Ventura Basin, the San Fernando Valley, and the San Gabriel Basin, lies within the greater Southern California region.

On the north, northeast, and east, the lowland basin is bound by the Santa Monica Mountains, Elysian Hills, Repetto Hills, and Puente Hills. To the southeast, the basin is bordered by the Santa Ana Mountains and the San Joaquin Hills. The western boundary of the basin is marked by the Continental Borderland and is part of the onshore portion. The California borderland is characterized by northwest trending offshore ridges and basins. The Los Angeles Basin is notable for its great structural relief and complexity in relation to its geologic youth and small size for its prolific oil production. Yerkes et al. identify five major stages of the basin's evolution, which began in the Upper Cretaceous and ended in the Pleistocene. This basin can be classified as an irregular pull-apart basin accompanied by rotational tectonics during the post-early Miocene.

== Formation ==
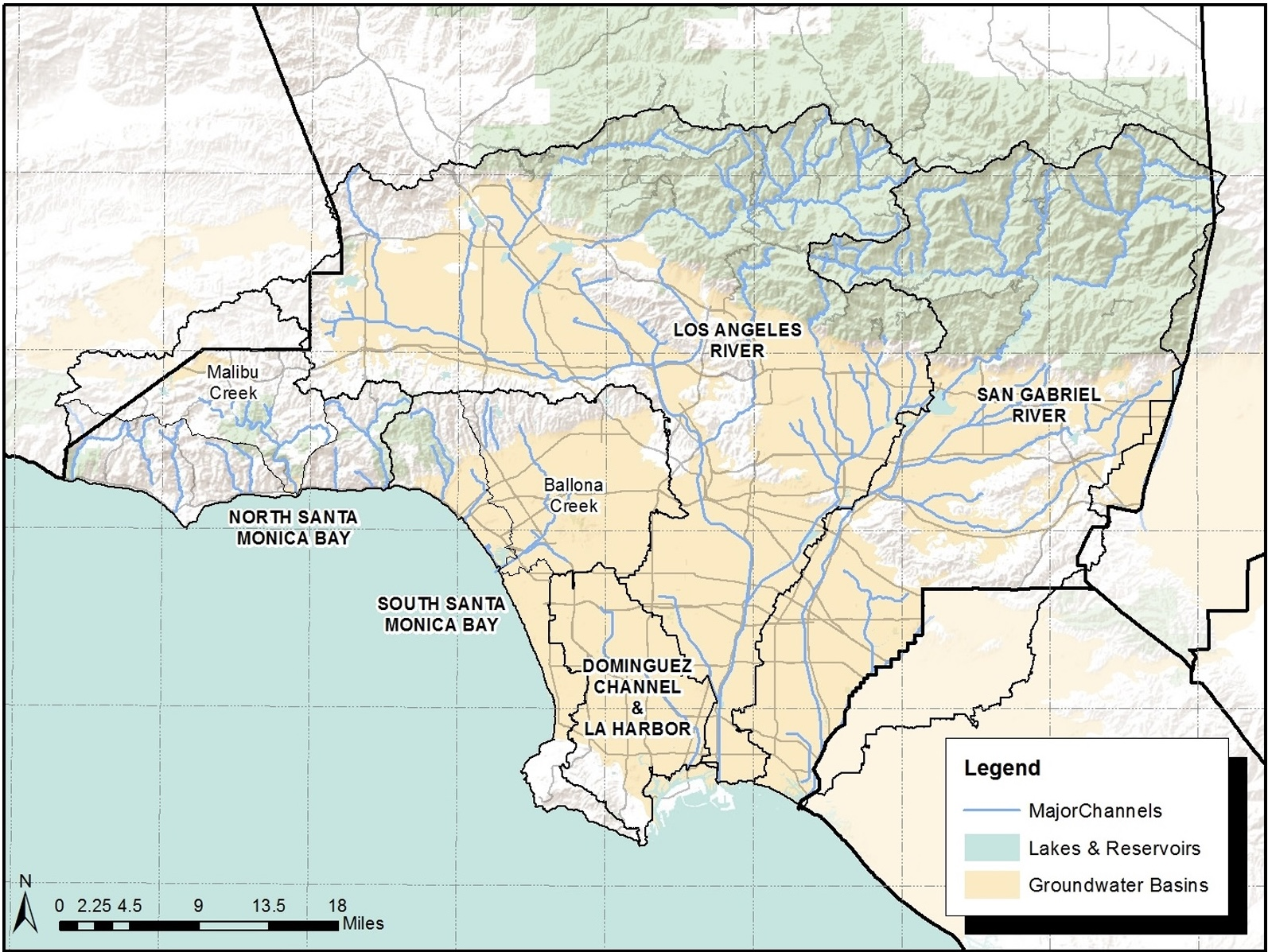
Los Angeles County has five major drainage basins, or watersheds: Santa Clara River, Ballona Creek, Dominguez Channel, Los Angeles River, and San Gabriel River

Before the formation of the basin, the area that encompasses the Los Angeles basin began above ground. A rapid transgression and regression of the shoreline moved the area to a shallow marine environment. Tectonic instability coupled with volcanic activity in rapidly subsiding areas during the Middle Miocene set the stage for the modern basin. The basin formed in a submarine environment and was later brought back above sea level when the rate of subsidence slowed. There is much discussion in the literature about the geologic time boundaries when each basin forming event took place. While exact ages may not be clear, Yerkes et al. (1965) provided a general timeline to categorize the sequence of depositional events in the LA Basin's evolution and they are as follows:

=== Phase 1: Pre-extension ===
During pre-Turonian, metamorphosed sedimentary and volcanic rocks are present that serve as the two major basement rock units for the LA Basin. Large-scale movement along the Newport–Inglewood zone juxtaposed the two bedrock units along the east and west margins. During this phase, the basin was above sea level.

=== Phase 2: Pre-basin phase of deposition ===
The hallmarks of this phase were successive shoreline transgression and regression cycles. Deposition of older marine and non-marine sediments began to fill the basin. Towards the end of this phase, the shoreline began to retreat and deposition continued.

=== Phase 3: Basin inception ===
After the deposition of the pre-Turonian units, there was a large emergence and erosion that can be observed as a major unconformity at the base of the middle Miocene units. Emergence did not occur at the same rate or in all sections of the basin. During this time, the basin was covered by a marine embayment. Rivers sourced in the highlands brought large amounts of detritus to the northeastern edge of the basin. During this period, the Topanga formation was also being deposited.

=== Phase 4: Principal phase of subsidence and deposition ===
The present form and structural relief of the basin was largely established during this phase of accelerated subsidence and deposition which occurred during the late Miocene and continued through the early Pleistocene. Clastic sedimentary rocks from the highland areas (to the north and east) moved down the submarine slopes and infilled the basin floor. Subsidence and sedimentation most likely began in the southern portion basin. Subsidence and Deposition occurred simultaneously, without interruption, until the late Pliocene. Until the rate of deposition gradually overtook the rate of subsidence, and the sea level began to fall. Towards the end of this phase, the margins of the basin began to rise above sea level. During the early Pleistocene, deposition began to outpace subsidence in the depressed parts of the basin and the shoreline began to move southward. This phase also had movement along the Newport–Inglewood fault zone that resulted in the initiation of the modern basin. This movement caused the southwestern block to be uplifted relative to the central basin block.

=== Phase 5: Basin disruption ===
The central part of the basin continued to experience sediment deposition through the Pleistocene from flooding and erosional debris from the surrounding mountains and Puente Hills. This infill was responsible for the final retreat of the shoreline from the basin. Deposition in the Holocene is characterized by non marine gravel, sand and silt. This phase also includes the late-stage compressional deformation responsible for the formation of the hydrocarbon traps.

== Geology ==
=== Blocks ===
Four major faults are present in the region and divide the basin in the central, northwest, southwest, and northeast structural blocks. These blocks not only denote their geographic location, but they indicate the strata present and major structural features. The southwestern block was uplifted prior to the middle Miocene and is composed mostly of marine strata and contains two major anticlines. This block also contains the steeply-dipping Palos Verdes Hills fault zone. The middle Miocene volcanics can be seen locally within the southwest block. The northwestern block consists of clastic marine sediments of Late Cretaceous to Pleistocene age. Middle Miocene volcanics are also present. This block has a broad anticline that is truncated by the Santa Monica fault zone. The central block contains both marine and non-marine clastic rock units interbedded with volcanic rocks that are late Cretaceous to Pliocene in age. Pliocene and Quaternary strata are most visible within the central block. Structurally, there is a synclinal trough. The northeastern block contains fine to coarse grained clastic marine rocks of Cenozoic age. Locally, middle Miocene volcanics can be seen as well as Eocene to Miocene aged non-marine sedimentary rocks. There is also an anticline in the northeastern block.

=== Stratigraphy ===
The stratigraphy of the Cenozoic Basin

Homogeneous evolution of this basin did not occur due to dynamic tectonic activity. Despite the active setting, there are over 9,100 m of strata within the basin. The dynamic setting was also responsible for the heterogeneous deposition of each formation. It is common for rock units of the same depositional event to have different names in different locations within the basin. This may be a result of large variation in clast size as with the upper Pliocene Pico Formation in the northwestern part of the basin and the Upper Fernando Formation in the southwest part of the basin. The Los Angeles Basin contains what is known as the "Great Unconformity" which has been interpreted as a large-scale erosional event in the basement rock unit. This unconformity is used to correlate strata throughout the basin. The record of the Cenozoic activity begins above this unconformity. The stratigraphic record for this basin indicates that it began as a non-marine environment and then transgressed to a deep ocean system. The oldest basement units of this basin are of both sedimentary and igneous origin. The sedimentary unit was metamorphosed as a result of slippage of the Newport–Inglewood fault and is known as the Catalina Schist. The Catalina Schist can be found on the southwestern edge of the basin and is predominantly a chlorite-quartz schist. Closer to the Newport–Inglewood fault zone, garnet-bearing schists and metagabbros occur. The Santa Monica Slate can be observed in the northwestern block of the basin. The eastern complex is characterized by Santiago Peak Volcanics. This rock unit contains andesitic breccias, flow, agglomerates and tuffs.

The Sespe Formation is the first to appear above the great unconformity and is marked by interbedded mudstones, sandstones and pebbly sandstones. This bed sequence indicates an alluvial fan, meandering stream or braided stream origin. Upward from the Sespe Formation toward the Vaqueros, the grains become finer and the beds become thinner; indicating a transition to a shallow marine environment. The Vaqueros Formation is marked by two sandstone, siltstone and shale units. There are also characteristic mollusk fossils that indicate the area was dominately shallow marine.

The Topanga Group is the next major formation in the stratigraphic sequence and infills the topography on older rocks. It is a mixed sedimentary and volcanic unit whose base is an erosional unconformity. The unit consists of 3 parts: First is a basal marine conglomeratic sandstone, followed by a dominantly basaltic middle layer of multiple submarine lava flows and tuffs. The youngest part of this unit is a sedimentary breccia, conglomerate, sandstone, and a siltstone. The earliest deposits of the Topanga Group appear to reflect the continuation of a shift in shoreline that can be seen in both the Sespe and Vaqueros formations. Eruptions from one or more of volcanic centers locally and temporarily interrupted sedimentation.

The Puente Formation is a deep-marine formation that is characterized by pro-delta sediments and an overlapping fan system. This unit lies above the Topanga Group giving it a Late Miocene depositional age and is divided into four members. The La Vida Member is a micaceous, platy siltstone with subordinate amounts of thin-bedded feldspathic sandstone. The next member is the Soquel, which is a thick bedded to massive micaceous sandstone. Locally abundant siltstone, conglomerate, and intraformational breccia can also be seen in this member. Above the Soquel lies the Yorba Member. This member is a sandy siltstone that is interbedded with a fine-grained sandstone. The Sycamore Canyon Member contains lenses of conglomerate, conglomeratic sandstone, and sandstone. Sandy siltstone and fine-grained sandstones are interbedded with the aforementioned rock types.

The Monterey Formation is characterized by abnormally high silica content compared to most clastic rocks. There are also silica-cemented rocks known as porcelanite and porcelanite shale. While this formation has distinguishable beds, there are many shale, sandstone, and mudstone beds that have normal amounts of silica. This sequence of this formation indicates an off-shore marine environment.

The Fernando Formation is split into two sub-facies known as the Pico and Repetto Members. These members represent a distinct change in the depositional environment and are of Pleistocene age. The Repetto is the older of the two members and is composed of interbedded fine to coarse grained siltstone, mudstone, and sandstone. The Pico Member is mostly made of massive siltstones and sandstones interbedded with minor silty-sandstones. Holocene alluvium and Quaternary sediments is a largely unconsolidated unit and is composed mostly of gravel and floodplain sediments. The sediments that mark the top of the basin can be found in modern streams/rivers and at the base of the foothills.

=== Tectonic setting ===
The history of this basin begins with the subduction of Pacific plate underneath the North American plate in the beginning of the Mesozoic. During this subduction event, two smaller plates, the Monterey and Juan de Fuca plates, also began to subduct underneath the North American plate. Around 20Ma, the Monterey plate attached to and followed the motion of the Pacific plate. Later, subduction of the Pacific-Monterey ceased and the plate margin was converted to a transform boundary. The North America/Pacific-Monterey transform boundary began to move north and created crustal extension. This rifting was accompanied with the rotation of the western Transverse Ranges. This rotation is responsible for the placement and northwest–southeast orientation of the LA Basin. Early in the Miocene, before deposition of the Topanga, high heat flow and transtension caused the extension of the basin. As the crust thinned, the basin began to subside from isostatic pressure as a result of large amounts of sediment deposition.

Because the basin lies on the boundary of the Transverse and Peninsular Ranges, this basin experiences both compressional and strike slip tectonics. During the early Pliocene, also identified as the "Basin Disruption" phase, deformation and folding occurred as a result of fault movement and a slight rotation event. While movement along the San Andreas Fault is responsible for the placement of the basin, it is the Whittier and Newport–Inglewood faults that have dictated the seismic behavior within the basin.

== Earthquakes ==
The Los Angeles basin is still active tectonically and the region continues to experience earthquakes as a result. Due to the number of faults and fault splays, seismic activity is not concentrated in one particular area. The cities that are overlain by the Newport–Inglewood and Whittier fault zones have a higher probability of experiencing seismic activity. The region experiences earthquakes that are mostly mild (magnitude ≤2.25). However moderate earthquakes (magnitude 4.9 to 6.4) have been reported. Earthquakes of moderate magnitude are very infrequent.

== Features ==
Structural features of the Los Angeles Basin

=== The Newport–Inglewood Fault Zone ===
This fault zone is the most notable feature within the basin that is a single strand with local (fault) splays. The fault zone is also marked by low hills, scarps, and ten anticlinal folds in a right-stepping en echelon pattern. It is located in the southwest portion of the basin and is a strike-slip margin. There are several oil fields that run parallel to this fault.

=== The Whittier Fault ===
This fault lies on the eastern border of the basin and mergers with the Elsinore Fault in the canyon of the Santa Ana River, one of the upper branches of the fault. This fault is a reverse right-oblique fault. It is most known for the Whittier, Brea-Olinda, Sansinena, oil fields. There is an anticline that runs parallel to the Whittier fault that is evidence for compressional deformation during the late Miocene to early Pliocene. Thinning and pinch-out of the Pliocene sandstones are evidence for uplift during this same time period.

=== The Anaheim Nose ===
The Anaheim nose is a subsurface feature that was discovered by geophysical surveys and exploratory drilling in 1930. It is a mid-Miocene fault block that revealed a northwest trending ridge of Paleocene age rocks. This structural feature is important because it revealed many oil traps and orientation of the beds indicate the age of subsidence in this portion of the basin.

=== The Wilmington Anticline ===
This particular anticline is the most notable subsurface feature within the basin. Deformation events such as erosion of the uplifted crustal blocks, initiation of various faults, and the development of the submarine channel led to the anticline's formation. Fold initiation began in the late-Miocene to early Pliocene period of deformation. There are many other anticlines within the basin and isopach data suggests that the formation of these folds occurred mostly during the Pliocene.

=== The La Brea Tar Pits ===
The La Brea Tar Pits are pools of stagnant asphaltum that have been found on the basin's surface. These "pools" are important because hundreds of thousands of late Pleistocene bones and plants have been found. These pits allowed scientists to better understand the ecosystem at that particular point in the geologic past.

== Petroleum ==
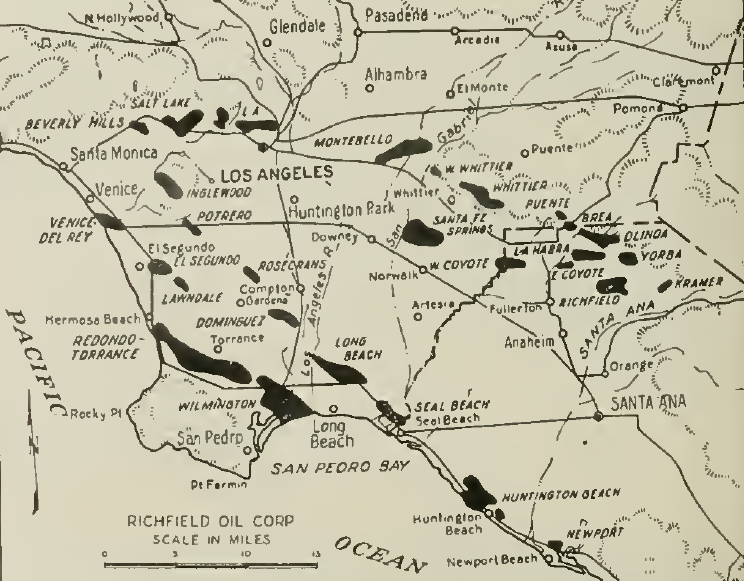
A map of the Los Angeles Basin's oil and gas fields

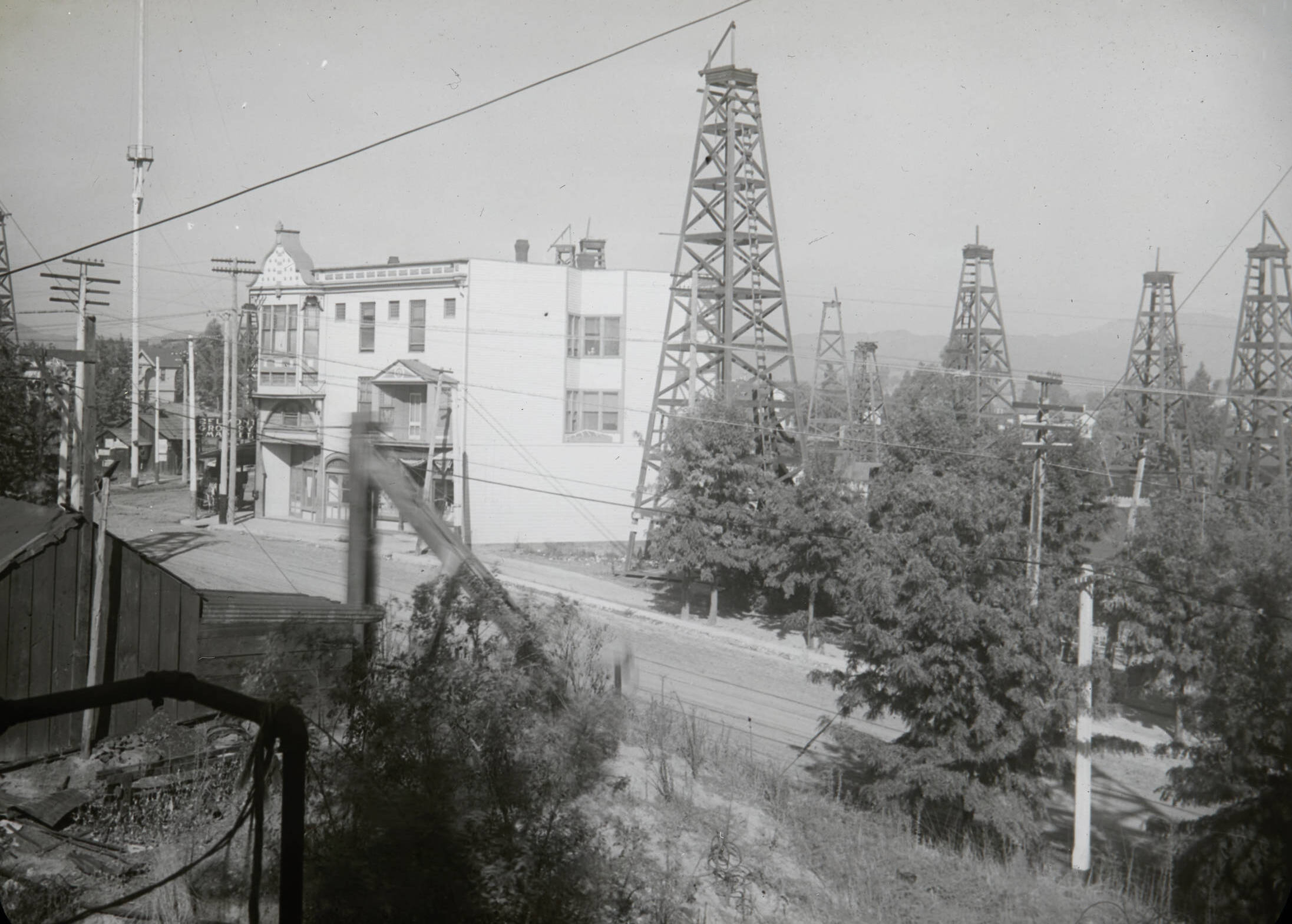
Los Angeles City Oil Field in 1905

Accumulations of oil and gas occur almost wholly within strata of the younger sequence and in areas that are within or adjacent to the coastal belt. The Puente formation has proved to be the most notable reservoir for petroleum in the basin. The primary reason for the high abundance of oil is because the oil sands are well saturated within the basin. The thickness of these oil sands range from hundreds to thousands of feet. Anticlines and faulted anticlines are the structural features that are also responsible for trapping oil.

The first reported oil-producing well was discovered in 1892 on the land that is presently beneath Dodger Stadium. This basin was responsible for half of the states oil production until the (90's?). This is remarkable due to the relatively small size and youth of the basin. The basin currently has about 40 active oil fields that collectively have 4,000 operating wells. In 1904, there were over 1,150 wells in the city of Los Angeles alone. Tight spacing and continued pumping of the wells resulted in most of the wells to dry up. Most recent data indicates that 255 million barrels of oil were produced in 2013. This is a large decline from the almost 1 billion barrels per year produced in the late 1970s.

Oil fields include:

- Beverly Hills Oil Field
- Brea-Olinda Oil Field
- Dominguez Oil Field
- Elwood Oil Field
- Huntington Beach Oil Field
- Inglewood Oil Field
- Long Beach Oil Field
- Los Angeles City Oil Field
- Salt Lake Oil Field
- San Joaquin Valley
- Wilmington Oil Field

== See also ==
- Climate of Los Angeles
- Greater Los Angeles area
- Los Angeles metropolitan area
- Oxnard Plain
- San Joaquin Valley
