= Dominguez Oil Field =

Oil field underneath Dominguez Hills, California

Coordinates: 33.8678°N 118.2459°W

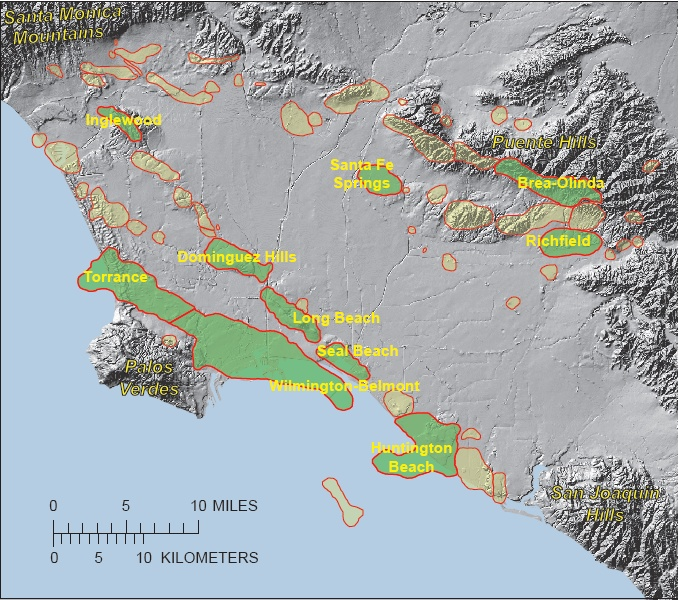
- Location of the Dominguez Hills Oil Field in the Los Angeles basin
- Country: United States
- Region: Los Angeles Basin
- Location: Los Angeles County, California; About fourteen miles south of the center of the city of Los Angeles.
- Offshore/onshore: onshore

Field history
- Discovery: 1923
- Start of development: 1923
- Start of production: 1923

Production
- Producing formations: Pico, Repetto, Topanga

The Dominguez Oil Field is a large oil field underneath Dominguez Hills near Carson, California and the California State University, Dominguez Hills. It was a major oil producer from 1923 through 1960. Starting in 2010, oil companies became interested in redeveloping the field using modern extraction technologies.

== History ==
Oil has been known in the Los Angeles basin since prehistoric times. The native inhabitants of the region used the tar for many purposes, including as a sealant, and the first European settlers found similar uses. In the mid-19th century, oil had become a valuable commodity as an energy source, commencing a period of exploration and discovery for its sources. By the 1890s, prospectors were drilling for oil in the basin, and in 1893 the first large field – the Los Angeles City Oil Field, adjacent and underneath the then-small city of Los Angeles – became the largest oil producer in the state. Oil companies began finding other rich fields not far away, such as the Beverly Hills and Salt Lake fields.

In the 1920s drillers began exploring the long band of hills along the Newport–Inglewood Fault zone, suspecting it was an anticlinal structure capable of holding oil. Huge fields along the zone were discovered at Huntington Beach Oil Field in 1920, and the Long Beach Oil Field in 1921. Although no oil was initially found, 1921 also marked the first drilling for oil at Dominguez Hills on the northwest side of the Dominguez Rancho, site of the famous battle during the Mexican–American War called the Battle of Dominguez Rancho in 1846. The mineral rights to this property were owned by Carson Estate Company, the Hellman Family, the Dominguez Estate Company, and the Burnham Exploration Company of Frederick Russell Burnham.

On September 7, 1923, Burnham Exploration partnering with Union Oil brought in the first producer on the site: Callender No. 1-A well at a depth of 4,068 feet (1,240 m) and 1,193 barrels per day (189.7 m^{3}/d). In a field that covered just two square miles, over 150 wells from Union Oil were soon producing 37,000 barrels a day, with 10,000 barrels a day going to the Burnham Exploration Company, a syndicate formed in 1919 between Frederick Burnham, his son Roderick, John Hayes Hammond, and his son Harris Hammond. Before long a number of refineries were up and running, with over 350 oil derricks, tank farms, and sprawling industrial complexes becoming a familiar part of the scenery. The principal leases were with Shell Oil Company and Union Oil of California and the first two wells were located west of Central Avenue and north of Victoria Street, Carson, California. In the first 10 years of operation, the Burnham Exploration Company paid out $10.2 million in dividends. In 1934, production was increased from about 100 million barrels to 200 million barrels annually. The spot where Burnham found oil was land where "as a small boy (in the 1870s) he used to graze cattle, and shoot game which he sold to the neighboring mining districts to support his widowed mother and infant brother."

Oil led to an increase in jobs in the community and a subsequent post-war population surge. An average of 300 barrels per day (48 m^{3}/d) was produced from each of these wells through the 1960s. After much of the oil was depleted, the land near the Dominguez field was re-developed and became the site of the California State University, Dominguez Hills.

In 2010, Occidental Petroleum Corporation expressed interest in redeveloping the former Dominguez oil field using modern extraction technologies. Starting in 2011, Occidental operated two test wells and had good results. The company proposed drilling as deep as 2.5 miles (4.0 km), from a 6.5-acre site at Charles Willard St. and Bishop Ave in Carson, then turning horizontally to get better access. Over the course of 10 years, 200 wells would be built along with an oil and gas processing facility, water treatment, water injection and slurry operations, and an electrical substation, producing 3 million standard cubic feet of natural gas and 6,000 barrels per day (950 m^{3}/d) of oil. However, the California Resource Corporation, formerly part of Occidental Petroleum, announced in 2015 that it was stopping the project due to a sharp drop in petroleum prices.

== Geology ==
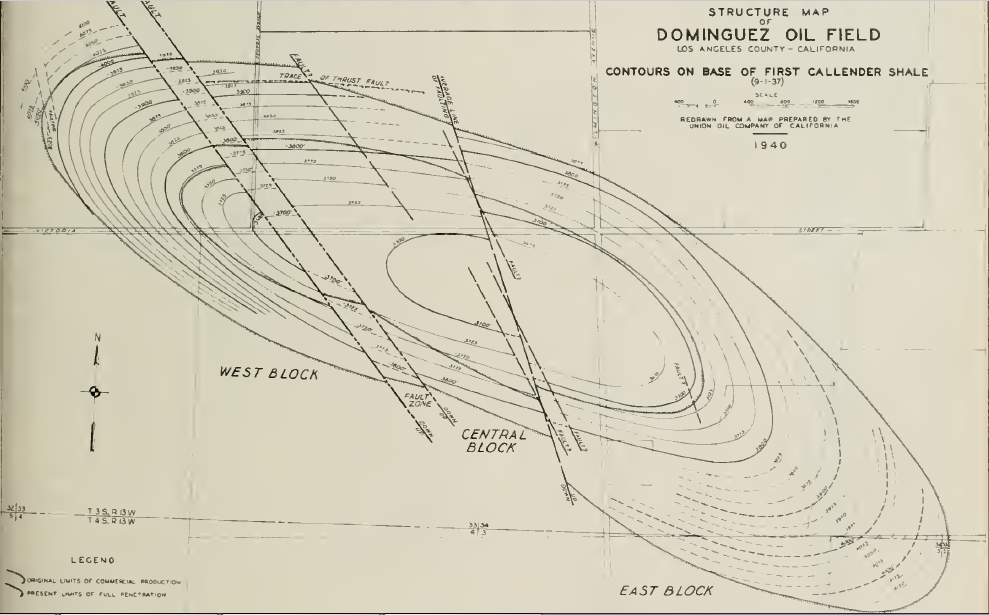
Dominguez Oil Field Structure Map

The Dominguez Oil Field is one of many prolific oil fields along the Newport–Inglewood Fault zone, which includes the Huntington Beach Oil Field on the south, the Seal Beach Oil Field, the Long Beach Oil Field, and to the northwest of that the Rosecrans, and Inglewood fields.

== See also ==
- Dominguez Slough
