= Emma Summers =

American oil tycoon

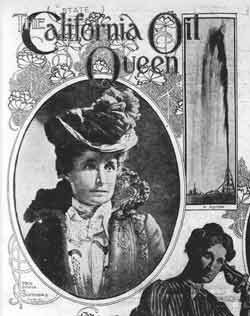
Emma Summers, from a 1901 newspaper article in The San Francisco Call about the "Oil Queen of California"

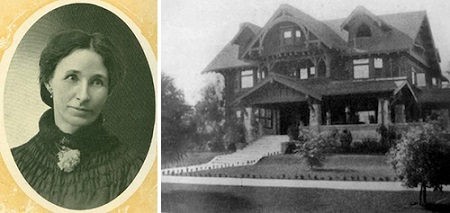
Emma Summers and her mansion on Wilshire Boulevard. From Sunset magazine, 1911.

Emma Summers (née McCutchen, 1858 – 1941) was an American oil tycoon in the 1890s and the early years of the twentieth century.

== Personal life and education ==
Emma McCutchen, whose father was a banker and local official, was born in Kentucky in 1858. She later attended the New England Conservatory of Music, from which she graduated in 1879. She subsequently married Alpha C. Summers. Emma Summers and her husband eventually settled in Los Angeles, where she taught piano.

== Career ==
In 1892, soon after taking up residence in the city, she took note of the rising oil business in Los Angeles. The following year, in 1893, she used $700 that she had earned in her piano teaching business to invest in half ownership of a well near her Los Angeles home. Soon developing a keen interest in many facets of the oil business, she educated herself about many phases of it. At first, there were mixed results and occasional setbacks. However, she soon acquired more wells and took an active role in managing her growing business. As a Sunset magazine article from 1912 later reported, "She was an expert in testing oil, hired all the men" and was involved in every part of the business.

By the early 1900s, Emma Summers had built an oil empire and was perhaps the most important oil tycoon in the area. Her success was widely noted, and she became known as California's "Oil Queen" (or variations of that appellation, such as “California's Petroleum Queen"). The San Francisco Call said she was "A woman with a genius for affairs," adding that "it may sound paradoxical, but the fact exists. If Mrs. Emma A. Summers were less than a genius she could not, as she does today, control the Los Angeles oil markets.”

As the oil boom subsided, Summers's fortunes declined. By 1915, the peak years of her oil business were over and she largely stepped away from her previously high-profile business life.

== See also ==
- History of oil in California through 1930
