= Catalina Schist =

Metamorphic rock complex on Santa Catalina Island, California, United States

Coordinates: 33.404°N 118.378°W

The Catalina Schist is a metamorphic rock complex primarily exposed on Santa Catalina Island of the Channel Islands of California.

It formed during the Cretaceous Period of the Mesozoic Era.

== Geology ==
The Catalina Schist is broadly correlated with the Franciscan Complex, a similar metamorphic complex formed along the California margin.

Both of these units record high-pressure/low-temperature metamorphism associated with the subduction of the Farallon plate beneath North America during the Mesozoic Era. The Catalina Schist is differentiated from the Franciscan primarily in the style of mélange formed during subduction.

In the Los Angeles Harbor Region, Catalina Schist is associated with the Wilmington Oil Field.

== See also ==
- Cretaceous California
- Channel Islands of California−related topics
