= Los Angeles City Oil Field =

Oil field in Los Angeles, California

Coordinates: 34.0659°N 118.2677°W

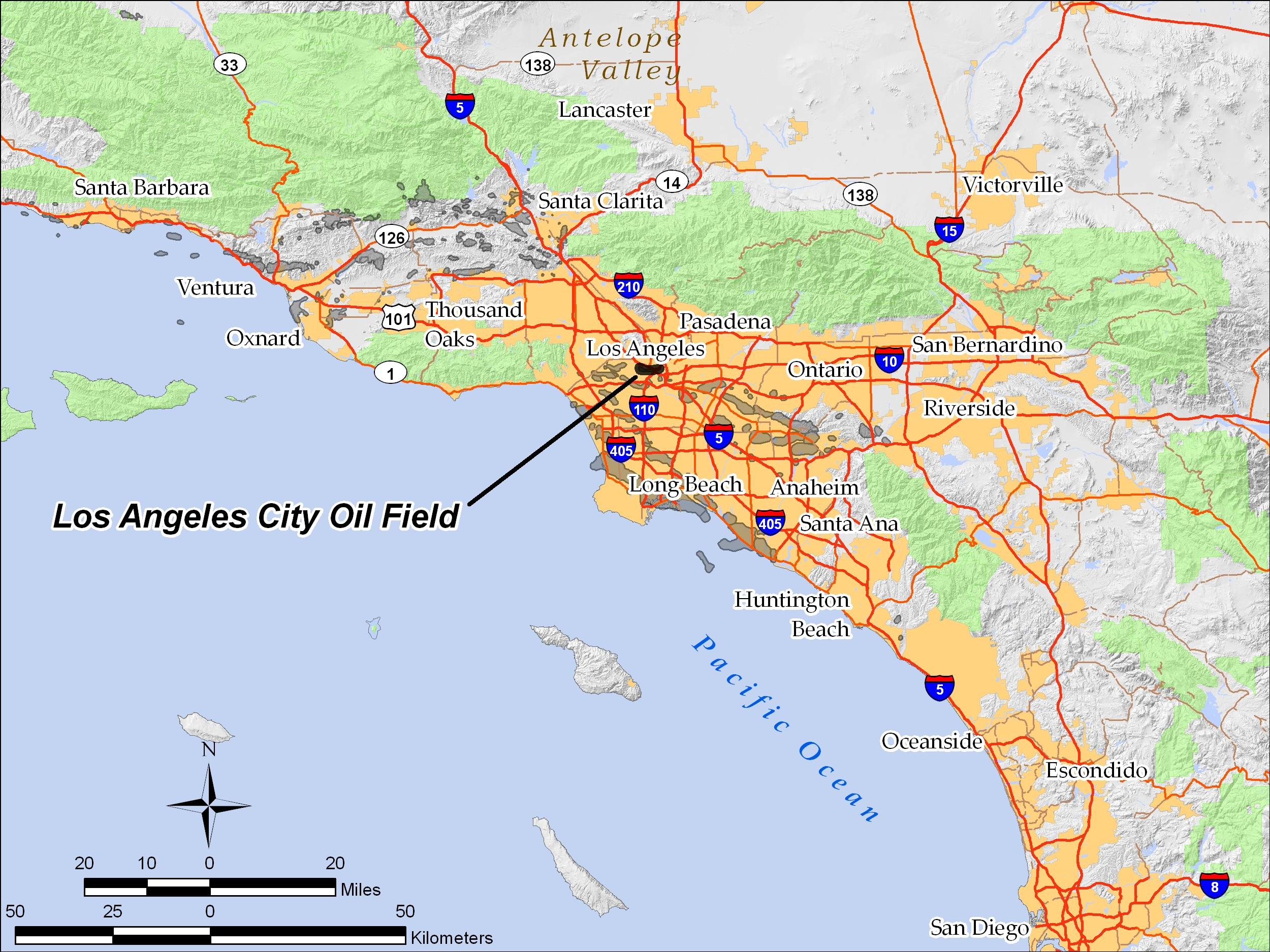
- The Los Angeles City Oil Field in the Los Angeles Basin of southern California. Other oil fields are shown in light gray.
- Country: United States
- Region: Los Angeles Basin
- Location: Los Angeles County, California
- Offshore/onshore: onshore
- Operators: Numerous ()

Field history
- Discovery: prehistoric
- Start of development: 1857
- Start of production: 1890
- Peak year: 1901

Production
- Current production of oil: 3.5 barrels per day (~170 t/a)
- Year of current production of oil: 2019
- Estimated oil in place: 0 million barrels (~0 t)
- Producing formations: Puente (Miocene)

The Los Angeles City Oil Field is a large oil field north of Downtown Los Angeles. Long and narrow, it extends from immediately south of Dodger Stadium west to Vermont Avenue, encompassing an area of about four miles (6 km) long by a quarter-mile across. Its former productive area amounts to 780 acres (3.2 km^{2}).

Discovered in 1890, and made famous by Edward Doheny's successful well in 1892, the field was once the top producing oil field in California, accounting for more than half of the state's oil in 1895. In its peak year of 1901, approximately 200 separate oil companies were active on the field, which is now entirely built over by dense residential and commercial development. As of 2011 only one oil well remains active – behind a fence on South Mountain View Avenue one block east of Alvarado Street in the Westlake neighborhood, producing about 3.5 barrels per day (0.56 m^{3}/d). The fortunes made during development of the field led directly to the discovery and exploitation of other fields in the Los Angeles Basin. Of the 1,250 wells once drilled on the field, and the forest of derricks that once covered the low hills north of Los Angeles from Elysian Park west, little above-ground trace remains.

== Setting ==
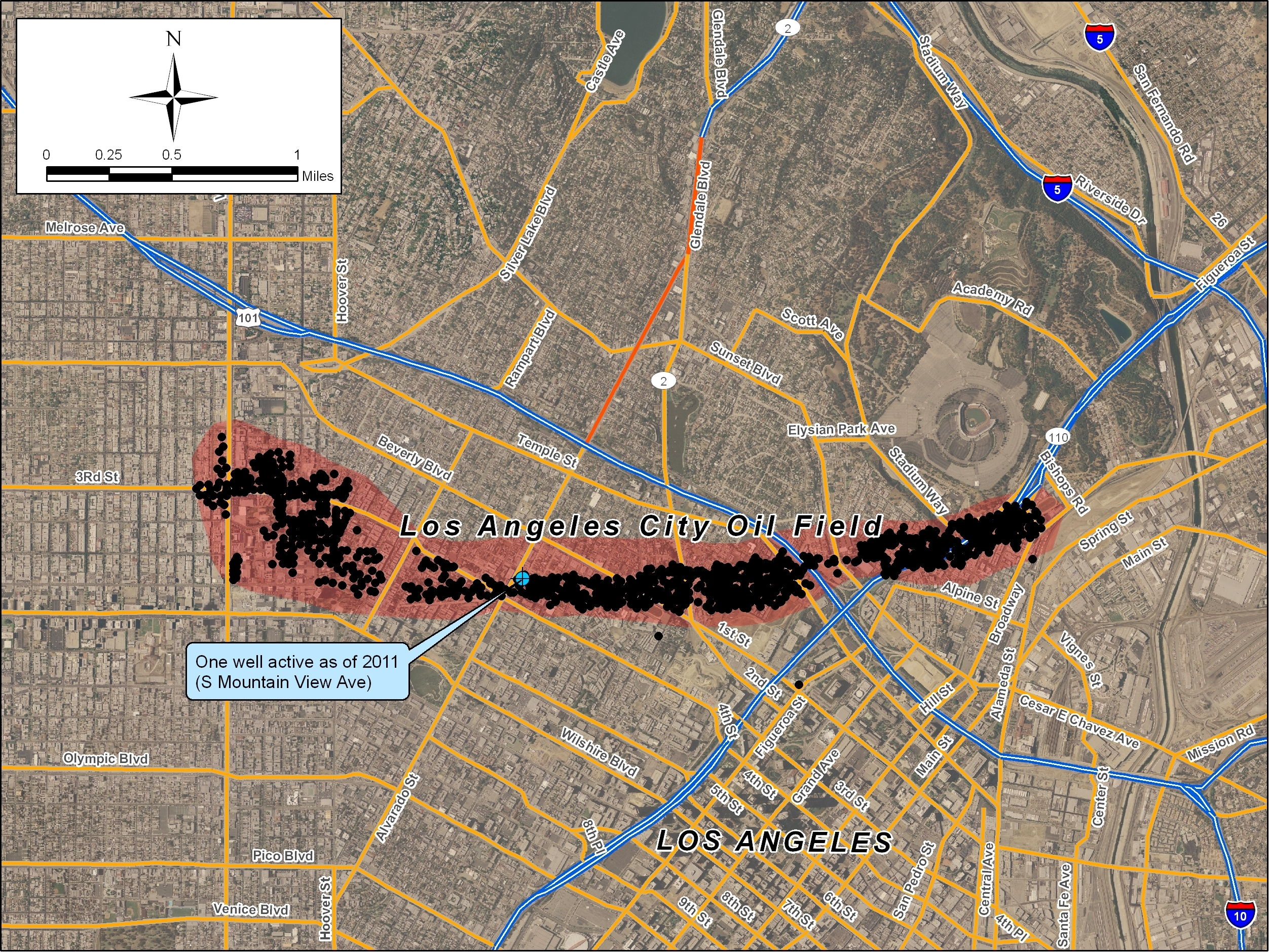
Detail of the Los Angeles City Field, showing locations of former wells, and single active well remaining in 2011.

The Los Angeles City field is one of many in the Los Angeles Basin. To the west are the still-productive Salt Lake and Beverly Hills fields; to the south is the Los Angeles Downtown Oil Field. Ten miles east-southeast is the Brea-Olinda field, the first to be worked in the region. Even larger fields are still productive in other parts of the basin, such as the giant Wilmington field which stretches from Carson to Long Beach.

Terrain in the vicinity of the Los Angeles City field includes gently rolling hills cut by ravines draining south. Elevations range from around 250 to 500 feet (150 m) above sea level, with the highest elevations in Elysian Park near Dodger Stadium. Urban development is dense in the part of Los Angeles containing the field's former productive area, with numerous apartment blocks mixed with commercial and light industrial structures. U.S. Highway 101, the Hollywood Freeway, parallels part of the field to the north, and California State Route 110, the historic Arroyo Seco Parkway – the first freeway in the United States – cuts directly through the eastern part of the field immediately south of Dodger Stadium. The neighborhoods that contain the field include, from west to east, Koreatown, Westlake, Echo Park, Chinatown, and Elysian Park.

Some significant public facilities built directly on the area of former oilfield operations include Shriners Hospital for Children, St. Vincent Medical Center, Belmont High School, and the Edward R. Roybal Learning Center.

== Geology ==
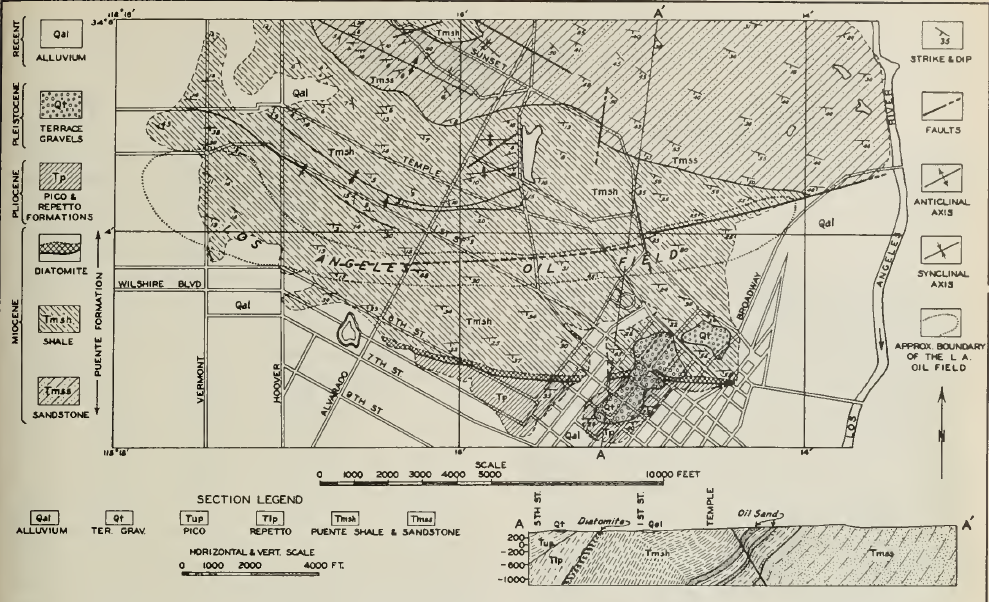
Los Angeles City Oil Field Geological map and cross section

Oil in the Los Angeles City field is relatively close to the surface. Every productive deposit has been in a single geologic unit, the shallow Miocene-age Puente Formation. Covering the Puente Formation throughout most of the area is a thin layer of Pliocene- and Pleistocene-age alluvium and terrace deposits.

Structurally the field is a faulted anticline which trends generally east to west, with oil accumulations trapped in sand units dipping south, ending to the north either at a fault – in the eastern part of the field – or at the surface as tar seeps, in the western area. Mechanisms of entrapment include pinchouts and local changes of permeability – forms of stratigraphic traps – and structural traps such as oil-bearing units blockaded by unrelated, impermeable units put there by motion along faults. Three separate producing horizons, or vertical zones, are present in the Puente Formation, and are given ordinal numbers: First, Second, and Third zones. In addition to these zones, small pockets of oil have been found throughout the upper part of the Puente. The average depth of the three zones from top to bottom is 900, 1,100, and 1,500 feet. Although wells have been drilled to much greater depths – for example, Seaboard Oil Company of Delaware drilled over 7,500 feet (2,300 m) into the Topanga Formation, of Miocene age – no commercial quantities of oil have been found at these great depths.

The field is split into three geographic zones, unrelated to the three vertical zones. The Western Area contains seeps that were known prehistorically; it is separated from the Central zone by a fault. The Central Area, the first to be exploited, extends from the fault to approximately the intersection of the Hollywood and Pasadena Freeways, and the Eastern Area extends northeast from that intersection.

Oil in the field is generally heavy, with API gravity averaging about 14, and ranging overall from 12 to 20. An early assessment by Paul Prutzman (1913) rated the quality of the oil from the field as low, due to the high sulfur content and absence of light fractions suitable for refining. The main use for oil taken from the field during the first decades of the 20th century was fuel oil, and it was also sprayed onto the young city's dirt roads to settle the dust.

== History, production, and operations ==
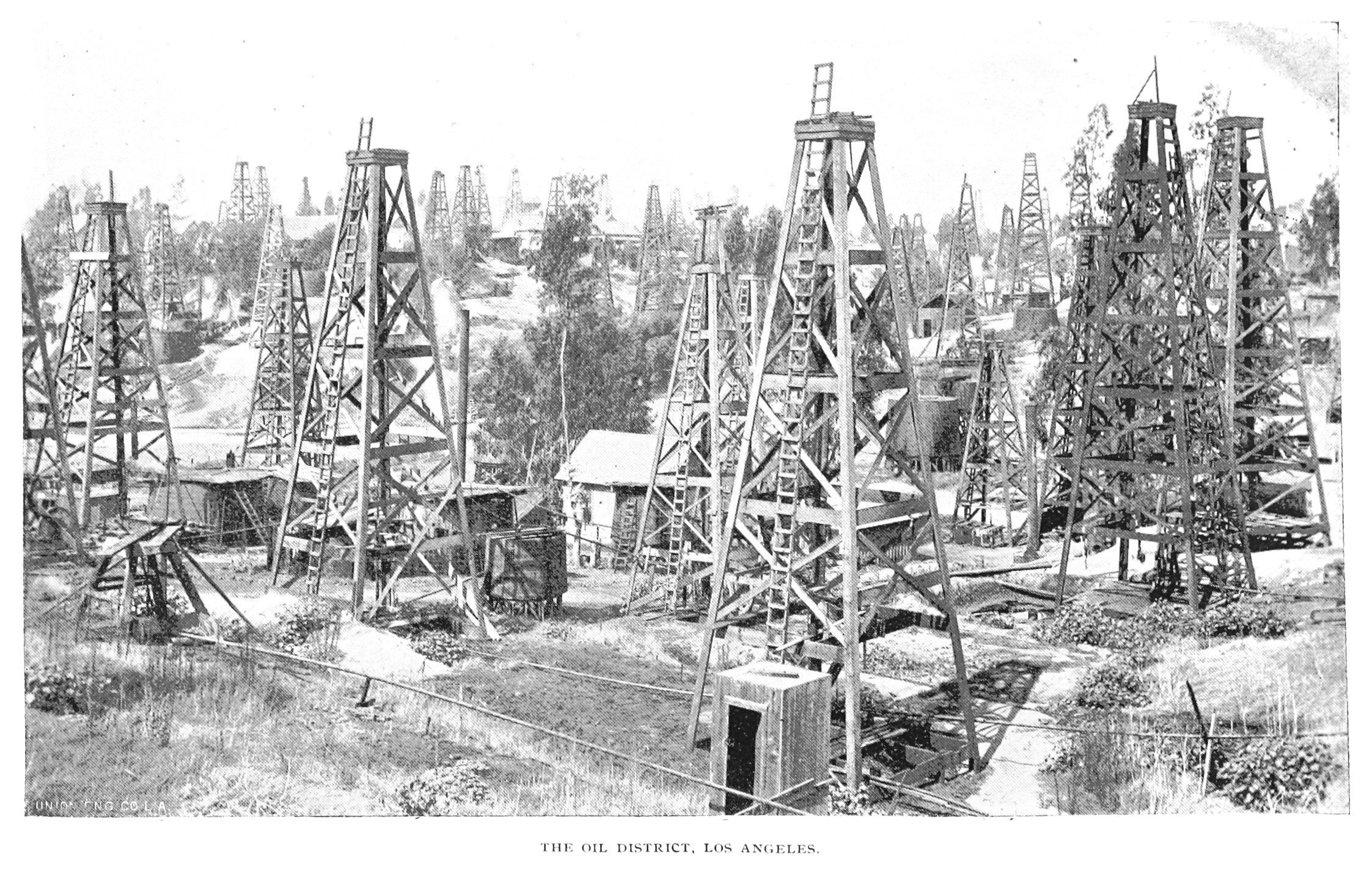
The field in 1895

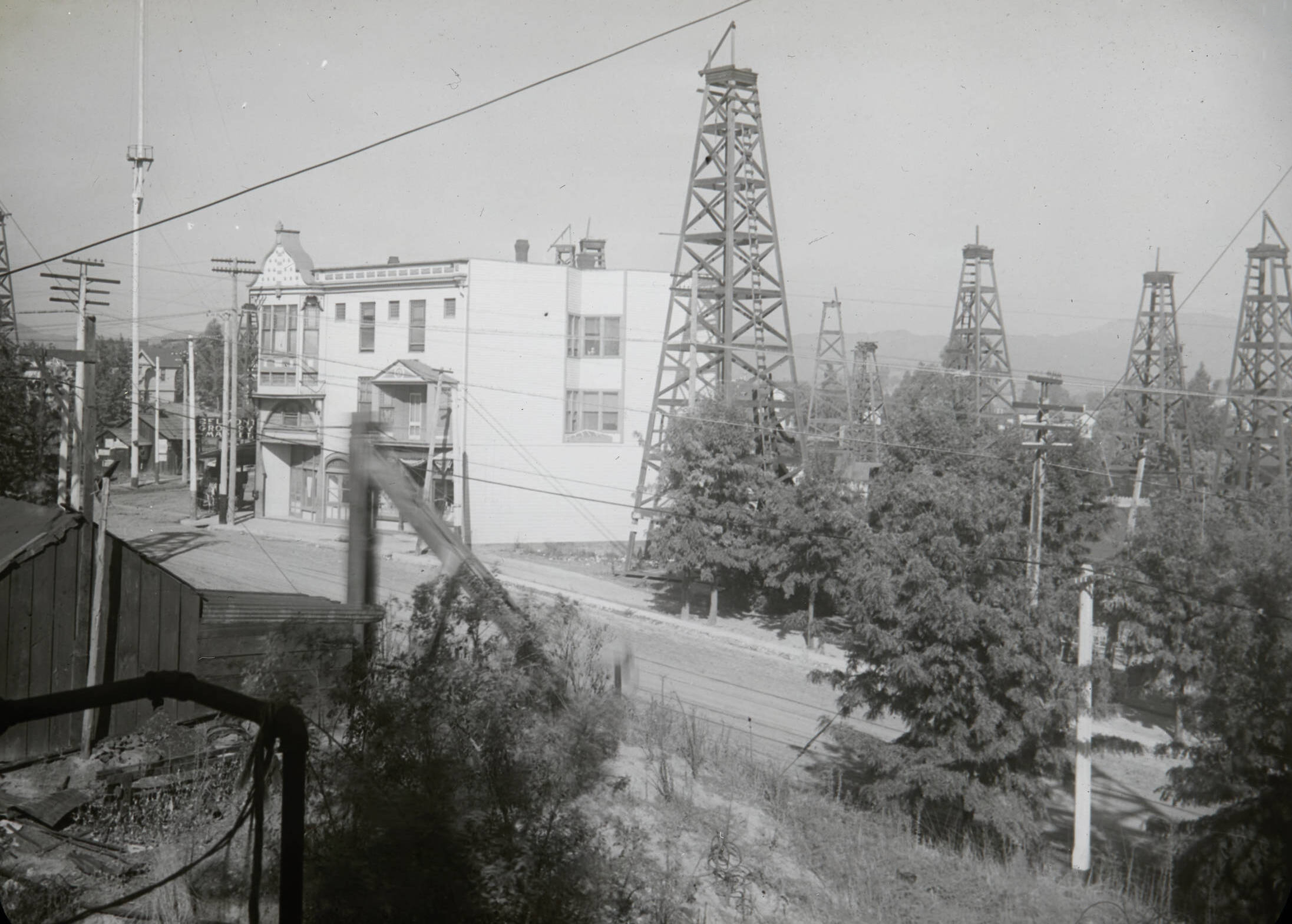
The field in 1905, near the corner of First and Belmont, facing east

=== Early development ===
Tar seeps have been known in the area from prehistoric times, and the Native American population of the Los Angeles basin used the tar for waterproofing and other purposes. The Spanish settlers used it for their lamps, as a sealant for roofs, and as grease for wagon wheels.

The earliest known well on the field, called the "Dryden Well", was a relatively shallow hole hand-dug near the intersection of 3rd Street and Coronado Street in 1857. It produced some heavy oil, tar, and asphaltum during the next 30 years, but the amounts were not recorded. The growing town purchased the product from the well owner to oil the streets. Another early well, this one a failure, was dug to almost 400 feet (120 m) in 1865 near the intersection of Temple and Boylston, but the attempt was abandoned after encountering hydrogen sulfide gas from the oil deposits, which were not far below. More persistent drilling in 1890 by several groups of prospectors, including Maltman and Ruhland, succeeded in establishing production of several barrels of oil a day, and the California Department of Conservation credits these drillers with discovering the field. However, it was Edward Doheny and Cannon's well, begun on November 4, 1892, that brought the field instant fame. They had dug a well to 155 feet (47 m), halting because of the accumulation of toxic hydrogen sulfide gas in the hole; however the oil seeps they encountered encouraged them to continue. Doheny brought in a sharpened eucalyptus log and used it as an improvised percussion hammer to deepen the well, and shortly afterwards they punctured an oil reservoir, and began producing about seven barrels a day.

While hardly a gusher, their first well at the corner of Colton and Patton Streets was in the middle of an area of hundreds of small town lots that had been sold in a land boom of 1887. Since there were no regulations in California on well spacing at this time, anyone with a lot, and the $1,000 to $1,500 to drill an oil well, could potentially become rich – especially if they could get their well into production before their neighbors drained the oil reservoir. Within a year of the Doheny well there were 121 wells on the field interspersed with homes and businesses, and the field's cumulative production had reached 100,000 barrels (16,000 m^{3}). Well crowding was extreme: the town lots were often only 50' by 150', and sometimes contained as many as four wells. By the end of 1895, the field was producing 2,000 barrels (320 m^{3}) of oil a day, had produced 750,000 barrels (119,000 m^{3}) in the preceding year, and accounted for sixty percent of the state's oil production. But it was still expanding: in 1896 a new well found oil east of the fault zone near Sisters Hospital which had previously been considered to be the eastern boundary of the field. By the end of 1897, 270 wells had been drilled into this new area. Cumulative production from the entire field at the end of that year had passed a million barrels, from 551 wells.

=== The "Oil Queen of California"; peak years ===
During the early development of the field, no single firm had a dominant share. Drillers started their own companies, flooding the local stock exchange with shares of start-up oil firms. There were so many of these that the Los Angeles Stock Exchange had to open a separate facility just to deal with oil stocks. By far the most successful entrepreneur on the field, however, was a piano teacher from Kentucky named Emma Summers, soon nicknamed the "Oil Queen of California." She purchased a half-interest in an oil well for $700 in the area of the present-day Civic Center, using the proceeds from her piano lessons, and then purchased some others on credit. As her wells became successful, she shrewdly acquired others, forcing other operators out of business, and selling her oil to various local power companies, hotels, and utilities, all while doing her own accounting and continuing to give piano lessons at night. When the price of oil peaked around $1.80 a barrel, she controlled about half of the wells on the central portion of the field. In 1903 the boom briefly turned to bust as the price of oil dropped to only fifteen cents a barrel, due to abundant oil flooding the market from the Los Angeles field and others just opening up both in the Los Angeles basin and in the San Joaquin Valley.

The peak year for the field was 1901, during which 1,150 active wells pumped over 1.8 million barrels (290,000 m^{3}). Over 200 separate companies were in operation on the field at this time. Of these, the largest were Union Consolidated Crude Oil Company, L.A. Terminal & Transport, and Westlake Oil Company. Edward A. Clampitt, an eastern businessman who had come to Los Angeles to make a fortune in the oil industry, was also one of the principal operators in the first decade of the 20th century. Production declined quickly after the peak; there were simply too many wells draining a reservoir of limited capacity and pressure, and less and less oil was able to be profitably extracted. After 1915 only two new wells were drilled on the field.

The early years on the field were not without mishap. In 1907, one of the gigantic redwood oil tanks near Echo Lake ruptured, and crude oil flooded downhill into the lake, catching fire and burning on the water for three days. The lake is now part of Echo Park, within the neighborhood of the same name. Lawlessness was a problem during the boom period as well, with oil thieves draining tanks overnight, stealing tools, and sabotaging wells of competitors.

As the boom years of the field occurred before the formation of regulatory agencies in California, record keeping was sometimes sparse, not only for oil production but for the very existence and location of the wells. R.E. Crowder, writing in 1961, counted 142 wells which likely existed, but could not be located; some may have been dry holes. A more recent survey suggested that up to 300 wells may have been drilled within the vicinity of the oil field but abandoned without a trace.

By 1961 most of the oil field was dedicated to redevelopment as a residential area, under the auspices of the Los Angeles Urban Renewal Association. At this time, 93 wells still remained active in the field, run by 22 separate companies. One by one the wells have been abandoned, with the one remaining well quietly pumping behind a fence on South Mountain View Avenue.

=== Recent land use controversies ===
After an explosion which leveled a Ross Dress for Less in the Fairfax District in 1985, caused by an overnight accumulation of methane which had seeped up from the underlying Salt Lake Oil Field, construction over Los Angeles's old oil fields became much more controversial and difficult. The city defined "methane zones" around all oil fields within its limits, and then enacted ordinances to ensure that new and existing structures within these zones were sufficiently ventilated to prevent the accumulation of explosive levels of methane. Mitigation systems for modern buildings include subsurface barriers, ventilation systems, methane detectors, and alarms. Thousands of buildings in the Los Angeles area have such systems, including the Staples Center and Los Angeles Convention Center.

Construction of the Belmont Learning Center, now known as the Edward R. Roybal Learning Center, "the nation's most expensive high school" began in 1988 adjacent to, and partially above, the former oil field, and within a methane zone. Soil tests in the early 1990s showed methane at high levels, possibly migrating up from old wellbores (not all of which were mapped, let alone abandoned to modern standards). Construction of the complex continued intermittently, with partial demolition and reconstruction after additional contamination and an earthquake fault were found. The Learning Center eventually was completed at a cost of $377 million, not far from the area that was the field's center of operations 100 years before.
