= Huntington Beach Oil Field =

Oil field in Southern California

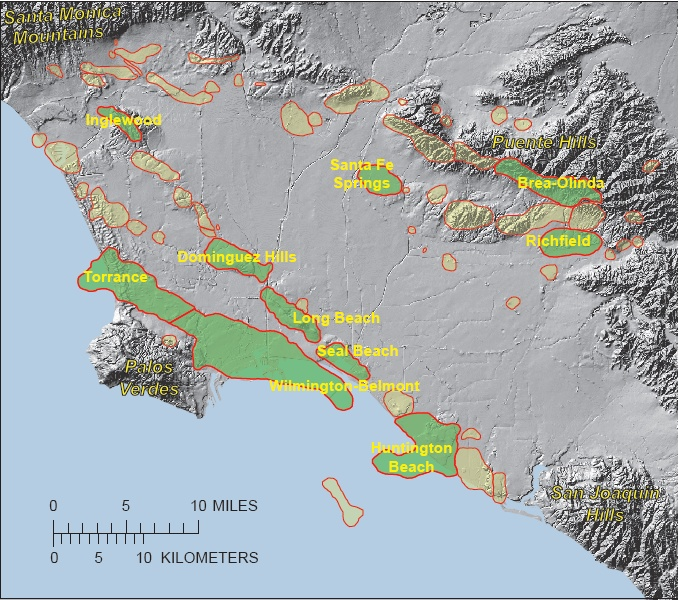
Location of the Huntington Beach oilfield in the Los Angeles Basin

The Huntington Beach Oil Field is part of rich pools of oil found along the West Coast of the United States in the early 1920s stretching from Huntington Beach, California to Santa Barbara, California.

== History ==
On May 24, 1920, the first Huntington Beach well, the Huntington A-1 33°41′01″N 118°00′34″W, was brought in as a producing well. By October 1921, the field had 59 producing wells. Even with 16 of those 59 wells being idle, the field produced 16,500 barrels of oil equivalent (101,000 GJ) per day, with each well producing from 50 to 200 barrels daily.

The conflict of coastal oil drilling with beachfront recreation and tourism has been a central theme in Southern California politics. The discovery of oil was followed by a real estate boom in the surrounding communities. For example, as the Huntington Beach Oil Field expanded, the homes in that area that stood in the path of drawing oil from the ground were physically relocated north 6 miles (9.7 km) in 1921-1922 to lots in Midway City, California, which "started Midway City". In addition, the discovery led to the development of the oceanfront community of Sunset Beach, California, which was established in 1905.

== Current operations ==
As of 2000, Huntington Beach had produced over a billion barrels of oil and 845 billion cf of natural gas. In 2013, the USGS estimated that the Huntington Beach Oil Field could produce an additional 117 to 866 million barrels of oil, with their best estimate being 370 million barrels. It is unlikely that all of this oil could be produced, given the location. The 2013 value of this estimate of potential oil, if it was produced, would be about $37 billion, at $100/bbl.

California Resources Corporation currently operates the Huntington Beach Oil Field in Orange County.

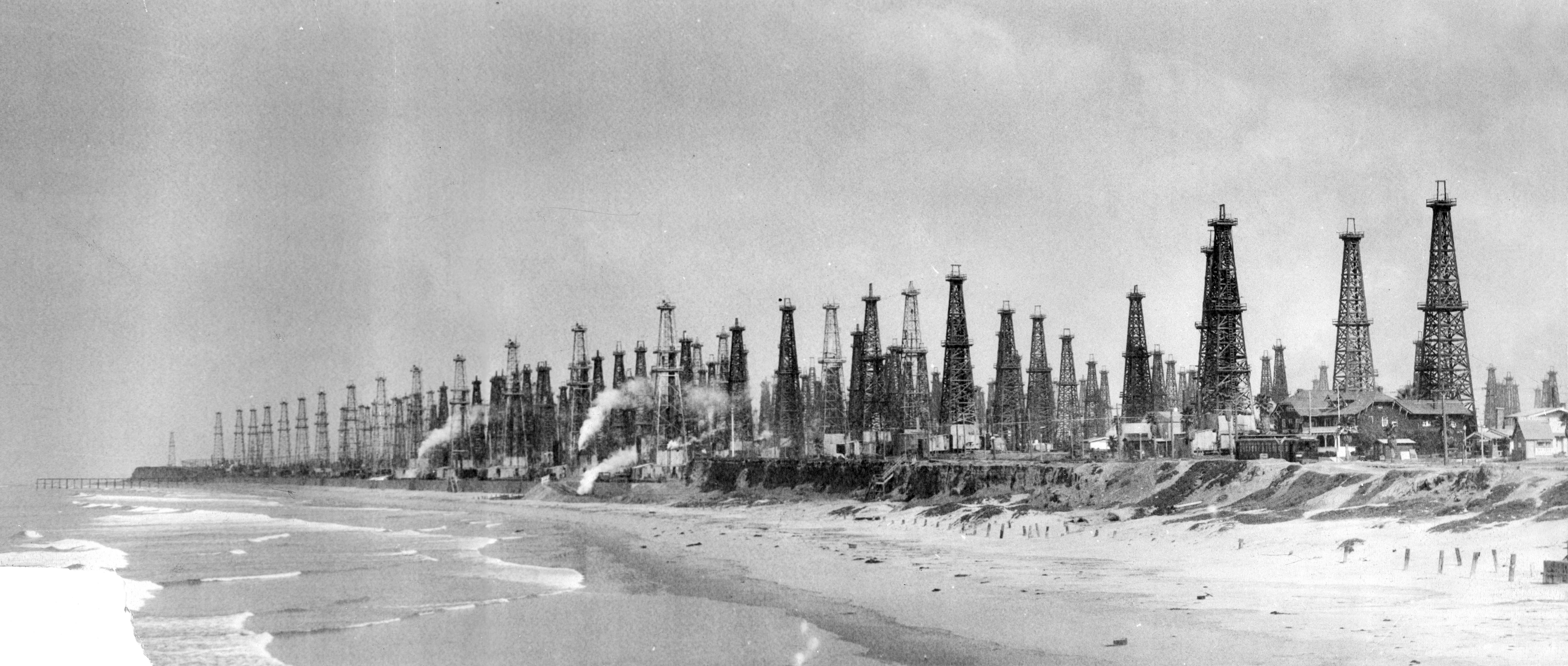
Huntington Beach six years after the Huntington A-1 first produced oil in 1920
