= Topanga Canyon Formation =

Miocene epoch geologic formation in southern California, United States

- Stratigraphic range: Neogene
- Type: Formation
- Underlies: Modelo Formation

Location
- Region: Santa Monica Mountains; Los Angeles County, California
- Country: United States

The Topanga Canyon Formation (/təˈpæŋɡə/) is a Miocene epoch geologic formation in the Santa Monica Mountains, Simi Hills, Santa Ana Mountains and San Joaquin Hills, in Los Angeles County, Ventura County, and Orange County, southern California. It is primarily composed of hard sandstone with some inter-bedded siltstone.

== Fossils ==
It preserves fossils dating back to the Miocene epoch of the Neogene period, during the Cenozoic Era.

== See also ==
- Miocene California
- List of fossiliferous stratigraphic units in California
- Paleontology in California
- Santa Monica Mountains-related topics
