= List of Maria Holic episodes =

An anime adaptation of Maria†Holic directed by Akiyuki Shinbo and Yukihiro Miyamoto and produced by Shaft aired in Japan between January 5 and March 23, 2009, on Chiba TV, containing twelve episodes. Naoyuki Tatsuwa acted as assistant director, Masahiro Yokotani wrote the series composition, and Tatsuya Nishiwaki composed the series music. Hideyuki Morioka designed the characters and served as chief animation director with Hiroki Yamamura (Studio Pastoral). Half of the series was outsourced outside of Shaft: episodes 2, 5, 7, 9, and 11 to Studio Pastora; and episode 8 to Magic Bus. (Note: Outsourcing studios credited as Production Assistance (制作協力) on their respective episodes.) The first episode of the anime was aired as a special broadcast on Animate TV from December 26, 2008, to January 4, 2009, and on AT-X on December 30, 2008. The anime series has been licensed by Sentai Filmworks and is being distributed by Section23 Films. The complete collection was released on DVD, February 23, 2010. Sentai Filmworks re-released the first season on DVD and Blu-ray with an English dub (produced at Seraphim Digital) on January 28, 2014. The opening theme is "Hanaji" by Yū Kobayashi, and the ending theme is a cover version of Yellow Magic Orchestra's 1983 single "Kimi ni, Mune Kyun" (君に、胸キュン) performed by Asami Sanada, Marina Inoue, and Yū Kobayashi, the voice actresses of the main characters.

A second anime season titled Maria†Holic: Alive, under the direction of Akiyuki Shinbo and Tomokazu Tokoro, began airing on April 8, 2011. Composer Tatsuya Nishiwaki and series composition writer Masahiro Yokotani returned for their respective roles, and Hideyuki Moroka once again designed the characters. However, Kenichi Ishikura replaced Naoyuki Tatsuwa as assistant director, and Noriyasu Yamauchi (Studio Pastoral) replaced both Hiroki Yamamura and Morioka as the chief animation director. Although Shaft is credited as the sole animation production company on the work, Studio Pastoral practically co-produced it. (Note: Studio Pastoral received the Animation Assistance (アニメーション協力) credit across all of the season's episodes, but many of the studio's animators and directors collaborated with Shaft on the series. Furthermore, the season lists two animation producers: Shaft president Mitsutoshi Kubota and Studio Pastoral president Yuuji Kanno.) The first BD/DVD volume for Maria†Holic: Alive, which contains unaired bonus footage, was released on July 27, 2011. Sentai Filmworks has licensed the second season and simulcasted the series on the Anime Network video website. The anime opening themes for Maria†Holic: Alive are "Mōsō Senshi Miyamae Kanako" (妄想戦士 宮前かなこ) by Tomokazu Sugita (episodes 1 through 4) and "Runrunriru Ranranrara" (るんるんりる らんらんらら) by Yū Kobayashi, and the ending theme is a cover version of Linda Yamamoto's song "Dōnimo Tomaranai" (どうにもとまらない) by Ame no Kisaki Gasshōdan. There is also a special ending song for episode 12, sung by Yū Kobayashi, titled "Don't Mind, Don't Mind!" (ドンマイ ドンマイ!, Donmai Donmai!) and was released on the same single as the other theme songs of the anime.

== Episode list ==
=== Maria†Holic ===
No.	Title	Directed by (Note: Information is taken from the ending credits of each episode.)	Written by	Storyboarded by	Original release date
1	"The Flirtatious Kiss"; Transliteration: "Tawamure no Seppun" (Japanese: 戯れの接吻)	Yukihiro Miyamoto	Masahiro Yokotani	Nobuyuki Takeuchi	January 4, 2009
Kanako Miyamae enrolls in the Catholic-based all-girls academy called Ame no Kisaki. On the way to the girls second dormitory, Kanako encounters a maid named Matsurika Shinōji, who mocks Kanako's tall stature, before a girl named Mariya Shidō quickly befriends Kanako with a kiss on the cheek. While Mariya leaves for archery practice, it is shown that Kanako has broken out in hives. At the girls second dormitory, Kanako goes to the Dorm Leader, who introduces Kanako to popular tomboy Ryūken Ishima as her new roommate. Kanako later goes to the archery training hall, where she shockingly discovers that Mariya is actually a boy disguised as a girl. Despite Mariya exploiting Kanako for only liking girls, Kanako is backed into a corner since she is a transfer student and Mariya is the grandchild of the former academy chairwoman. When Kanako returns to the girls second dormitory, she is distraught upon learning that her roommate is replaced by none other than Mariya himself as collateral for keeping Mariya's true identity a secret.
2	"A Sweet Tinge"; Transliteration: "Kanbi na Uzuki" (Japanese: 甘美な疼き)	Yoshihiro Mori	Masahiro Yokotani	Naoyuki Tatsuwa	January 11, 2009
On her first day of school, Kanako has a troublesome morning establishing privacy with Mariya. Kanako unfortunately skips breakfast, having to embarrassingly change clothes under the covers. Mariya takes Kanako to see homeroom teacher Fumi Kumagai, though Kanako reminds herself that she is sworn to secrecy concerning Mariya's true identity. During homeroom class, Kanako sits next to Nanami Kiri, Yuzuru Inamori and Sachi Momoi, all of whom Kanako fantasizes about. Mariya gives a welcome speech during the opening ceremony. When Kanako's stomach growls loudly, Mariya publicly takes the blame for skipping breakfast. As student council president Ayari Shiki starts to give her welcome speech, Sachi discreetly gives Kanako some candy. Afterwards, Ryūken privately talks to Kanako regarding why she was suddenly driven out of the dorm room. Mariya arrives to clear up the confusion to Ryūken, using a scare tactic to mention several mysterious seafood incidents in the dorm room. After a depressed Ryūken leaves, Mariya plans his revenge against Ayari. Kanako has a tinge of affection for Mariya despite having repulsive thoughts of him.
3	"Masochistic Young Buds"; Transliteration: "Higyaku no Wakame" (Japanese: 被虐の若芽)	Naoyuki Tatsuwa	Masahiro Yokotani	Naoyuki Tatsuwa	January 18, 2009
Mariya and Matsurika give Kanako a new school bag since the old one was filled with expanding seaweed. When Kanako prepares to wear her cross necklace to class, Mariya instead lends his precious rosary, which used to belong to his grandmother. Kanako finds jellied meat in her classroom desk and ends up eating it with Yuzuru and Sachi, who both help Kanako find out the true value of the rosary. Honoka Tsutsui and her two buds, all of whom are fans of Ryūken, try to switch Kanako's pen case with whole dried bonito. However, Kanako's school bag mysteriously consumes the bonito before Kanako returns from changing into her gym clothes. As Honoka expresses jealousy about Kanako being on good terms with Mariya, Honoka snatches the rosary from Mariya and pretends to throw it out the classroom window. Kanako runs outside and searches for the rosary, even when it starts to rain. She worries about paying for a new rosary until Nanami shows up outside with the rosary in her hand. When Kanako and Nanami return inside the classroom, Nanami claims to be dating Kanako right in front of Honoka. In the girls second dormitory, Ryūken vows to protect Kanako henceforth.
4	"The Cost of Pleasure"; Transliteration: "Etsuraku no Daishō" (Japanese: 悦楽の代償)	Tomoyuki Itamura	Masahiro Yokotani	Tomoyuki Itamura	January 25, 2009
Much to Mariya and Matsurika's demise, Ryūken waits for Kanako outside the dorm room wearing her kendo uniform. At school, Honoka apologizes to Kanako for bullying. Kanako learns that Nanami was only looking out for her by Kumagai's request. Ryūken attempts to act as a bodyguard for Kanako during homeroom class, but Kumagai kicks out Ryūken from the class since she is an upperclasswoman. As Kanako discusses with Yuzuru and Sachi that Ryūken's protection is causing more pain than pleasure, Kanako is unable to admit this to Ryūken herself. Ryūken is soon granted permission by the Dorm Leader to stay in Kanako's dorm room, much to Mariya's annoyance. At night, Ryūken explains to Kanako that she had a dog and a cat named Saneatsu and Kohime. Ryūken was told that Saneatsu ran away after being bullied by Kohime, but Kohime waited for the return of Saneatsu thereafter. However, Saneatsu was actually buried in Ryūken's backyard all along. The next day, Nanami privately speaks with Ryūken at school. Ryūken was told that Kanako and Nanami are secretly dating. Elsewhere, Honoka plots another seafood incident that may affect the entire school body.
5	"Forbidden Smell"; Transliteration: "Kindan no Nioi" (Japanese: 禁断の匂い)	Kenichi Ishikura	Miku Ooshima	Kenichi Ishikura	February 1, 2009
5	"A Young Girl's Secret"; Transliteration: "Otome no Himitsu" (Japanese: 乙女の秘蜜)	Kenichi Ishikura	Miku Ooshima	Kenichi Ishikura	February 1, 2009
The Dorm Leader goes to Kanako's dorm room in order to confiscate and discard a can of smelly surströmming, previously an apology gift from Honoka. Kumagai encourages Kanako to become friends with Nanami. In homeroom class, Kanako is voted as the class representative while Nanami volunteers as the deputy representative. Kanako eventually turns to Sachi and Yuzuru for advice on making friends with Nanami. As the plans backfire during school, Sachi and Yuzuru ultimately make friends with Nanami after school, prompting Kanako to jump in at the opportunity. The Dorm Leader later collects and displays all the prohibited items found inside the girls dorm rooms in the lobby, keeping score on how well or badly they were hidden. Kanako's school bag, containing a mysterious creature inside, is among the prohibited items. Kanako is given a second chance to hide her school bag properly if she passes the supplementary test, or else her old elementary school graduation essay will be read aloud publicly by the Dorm Leader. Mariya and Matsurika then show Kanako a secret living space inside the dorm room. Kanako is forced to hide her school bag in the woods, but it reappears in her closet.
6	"Infirmary of Perversion"; Transliteration: "Tōsaku no Hokenshitsu" (Japanese: 倒錯の保健室)	Masayuki Iimura	Masahiro Yokotani	Naoyuki Tatsuwa	February 8, 2009
Kanako will be helping out with the upcoming general health check, but she realizes that Mariya will skip the general health check after she notices him ditching breakfast. In the infirmary, school nurse Tonomura assigns the class and deputy representatives for taking measurements. However, Kanako faints and recuperates after Nanami undresses to take her measurements. Sachi, Yuzuru and Honoka visit Kanako in the infirmary, where Kanako apologizes for her behavior. Kanako passes out again upon seeing Mariya with a real bust. She wakes up and strongly believes that this Mariya is still a boy. When the real Mariya shows up, it turns out that Kanako was talking to Mariya's twin sister Shizu Shidō, who attends the all-boys academy Mihoshi no Mori dressed as a boy. Based on their late grandmother's will, Mariya and Shizu must attend school dressed as the opposite sex and keep their identity a secret, with the prize being chairmanship of both academies. Mariya's secret was discovered before Kanako's enrollment and Shizu's secret was discovered after Kanako's enrollment. After Shizu run out the infirmary in embarrassment, Mariya confides in Kanako that he was using tough love on Shizu. Kanako is later accused of stealing Honoka's black underwear.
7	"The Suspicious Black Underwear"; Transliteration: "Giwaku no Kuro Shitagi" (Japanese: 疑惑の黒下着)	Yoshihiro Mori	Miku Ooshima	Tomoyuki Itamura	February 15, 2009
The Dorm Leader was able to solve the case of Honoka's missing black underwear. During lunch, Kanako watches as Nanami feeds Sachi some bitter melon. After Sachi feeds Kanako a pig's foot from Nanami's boxed lunch, Yuzuru starts to become depressed. Mariya later learns that Yuzuru has been slipping during archery practice while overhearing that her birthday is soon approaching. In the dorm room, Kanako eventually realizes from Mariya and Matsurika that Yuzuru is jealous that Nanami and Sachi are becoming closer friends. During archery practice, Yuzuru confides in Mariya that her emotions are affecting her actions, though Mariya advises Yuzuru to discipline her emotions. Both Sachi and Nanami come to spectate Yuzuru during her archery practice, but Yuzuru runs away in frustration. The next day, Kanako, Nanami and Sachi hear that Yuzuru is bedridden with a fever. Kanako, Nanami and Sachi go to Yuzuru's dorm room and throw a surprise birthday party. Before Sachi explains that she helped Nanami choose a birthday present, Nanami gives Yuzuru a new archery glove. While Kanako came empty-handed, Mariya and Matsurika soon arrive with their own birthday present for Yuzuru as the birthday party is celebrated.
8	"The Tainted Holy Mother, Part 1"; Transliteration: "Kegareta Seibo・Zenpen" (Japanese: 穢された聖母·前編)	Yukihiro Miyamoto	Miku Ooshima	Naoyuki Tatsuwa	February 22, 2009
After hearing Mariya sing the Catholic hymn "Tota pulchra es", Kanako learns about the upcoming annual Virgin Mary Festival from Nanami, Sachi and Yuzuru. Ayari assigns Ryūken, Kanako and Mariya as the members of the executive committee for the Virgin Mary Festival. When Kanako asks Ayari about the Virgin Mary Festival, Ayari suggests for Kanako to talk to Mariya. While walking with student council vice president Maki Natsuru, Ayari recounts that she always despised Mariya ever since they were young. Elsewhere, Matsurika believes that Mariya has a weak spot for family, especially Ayari, who has held a grudge on Mariya for all these years. In the hallway, Kanako is impaled with a basketball thrown by Matsurika. Ayari and Maki encounter Kanako in the hallway and take her to the infirmary. They assure her that she will do well with festival preparations even if she does not know much about it. Despite the fact that Kanako is tainted as an atheist, Ayari and Maki reveal that they are not true Christians, though they still pray for something beautiful to happen. In the dorm room, Kanako learns that Mariya is a true Christian, but Mariya still mentions that Kanako's intentions are perverse.
9	"The Tainted Holy Mother, Part 2"; Transliteration: "Kegareta Seibo・Kōhen" (Japanese: 穢された聖母・後編)	Kenichi Ishikura	Masahiro Yokotani	Tomoyuki Itamura	March 1, 2009
9	"The End of a Fantasy"; Transliteration: "Mōsō no Hate ni" (Japanese: 妄想の果てに)	Kenichi Ishikura	Masahiro Yokotani	Tomoyuki Itamura	March 1, 2009
On the day of the Virgin Mary Festival, Ayari still holds a grudge against Mariya. In the park, Kanako, Nanami and Ryūken distribute flower baskets while Maki dresses up Ayari as the Virgin Mary on a float. Ayari remembers that Mariya supposedly ripped open her angel costume from behind and exposed her panda underwear during the Virgin Mary Festival years ago. When Ayari slips off the float, Mariya manages to catch her fall. Ayari tries to reconcile with Mariya in his arms, but Mariya mutters that Ayari is heavy, causing an irritated Ayari to inadvertently tear her dress and embarrassingly expose her bust. Kanako has a massive nosebleed upon seeing this, leaving a tainted bloodstain on the Virgin Mary statue. Sachi then tells Kanako, Nanami and Yuzuru about the seven wonders of Ame no Kisaki, one of which was the blood-filled swimming pool. However, Kanako later tells Mariya and Matsurika that she caused the blood-filled swimming pool due to her fantasies. Mariya and Matsurika confirm that Kanako also caused the other six wonders of Ame no Kisaki. Afterwards, Kanako learns from Kumagai about six wonders of the girls dormitory. When Mariya reveals the seventh wonder, the Dorm Leader mysteriously appears.
10	"A Flat-Chested Error"; Transliteration: "Binyū no Ayamachi" (Japanese: 微乳の過ち)	Naoyuki Tatsuwa	Masahiro Yokotani	Naoyuki Tatsuwa	March 8, 2009
10	"A Love Letter from Berlin"; Transliteration: "Berurin no Koibumi" (Japanese: 伯林の恋文)	Naoyuki Tatsuwa	Masahiro Yokotani	Naoyuki Tatsuwa	March 8, 2009
Kumagai returns the scores of the midterms during homeroom class, and it turns out that only Kanako and Nanami need to take the resit midterms. Although Nanami only failed math and science, Kanako failed math, world history, English, Modern Japanese and physics. As Mariya realizes that Kanako only passed ethics and chemistry, Kanako recalls that she played Othello with Mariya instead of studying for the midterm exams. On the day of the resit midterms, Kanako's personality has altered thanks to Matsurika's sleep-learning technique. Kanako almost boycotts the resit midterms, though she passes them with errors after reconsidering. Later on, Nanami tells Kanako, Sachi and Yuzuru that she received a love letter written by a man from Berlin aboard a train. After Nanami receives the man's paper résumé and chronological revolutions on a bamboo slip, Honoka exclaims that the man is using random acts of carelessness to win Nanami's heart. While Kanako, Sachi and Yuzuru try to help Nanami avoid the man's advances, Matsurika resolves this by stamping a "rejected" seal on the man's résumé, so Nanami can return it to him. This leads the man to give up on Nanami. Sachi soon receives a love letter by the same man.
11	"An Offering to God"; Transliteration: "Kami e no Kumotsu" (Japanese: 神への供物)	Yoshihiro Mori	Miku Ooshima	Yoshihiro Mori	March 15, 2009
Modern Japanese teacher and priest Tōichirō Kanae develops a crush on Mariya and Matsurika, though unaware that Mariya is a boy. Kanae is clueless that Kanako has androphobia, recalling that Kanako had spasms during her Modern Japanese resit midterm. As Kanae remembers that Kanako has terrible nosebleeds, he turns to Mariya and Matsurika for advice. Mariya lies about Kanako having an "older brother" who passed away from the "Tchaikovsky syndrome in B minor". Then, Mariya asks Kanae to help Kanako since Kanae reminds Kanako of her "older brother". Kanae tries his best to help Kanako, but she breaks out in hives upon contact and is sent to the infirmary. After talking with Kumagai, Kanae goes to the girls dormitory after school. The Dorm Leader confirms that Kanako has the syndrome, and Kanae is allowed to briefly visit Kanako after he bribes the Dorm Leader with a plasma television. When Kanae arrives at the dorm room, Mariya and Matsurika give Kanako some privacy. However, Kanae begins fantasizing about Mariya and Matsurika until the Dorm Leader kicks him out of the girls dormitory. Outside in the rain, Kanae also falls in love with Ayari, who offers her umbrella to him.
12	"A Swimming Competition Full of Pretty Girls: There Will Be Flying Tops"; Transliteration: "Bishōjo Darake no Suiei Daikai Porori mo Aru yo" (Japanese: 美少女だらけの水泳大会 ポロリもあるよ)	Yukihiro Miyamoto	Masahiro Yokotani	Naoyuki Tatsuwa	March 22, 2009
Kanako is very excited because the swimming pool is finally opening, though she just wants to see all the girls in their swimsuits during swimming classes. As swimming instructor Ayano Enjōji saves Kanako from drowning, Kanako learns from Mariya and Matsurika that she was daydreaming the scene in the dorm room. Kanae visits the dorm room and brings Kanako a melon as a gift. However, his close contact with Kanako causes her to break out in hives and stay in bed for ten days. When she returns to class, she finds tonburi in her classroom desk and jelly ear fungus in her school bag. Honoka deduces that the culprit is someone trying to scare Kanako with these mountain delicacies. Although Kanako plans everything for the last swimming class, it unfortunately rains on that day and a swimming competition is scheduled before summer break begins. Thanks to Matsurika's sleep-learning technique again, Kanako has a newfound fascination for loincloths on the day of the swimming competition in the form of a chicken fight. After realizing that Shizu switched places with Mariya just for the swimming competition, Kanako has a massive nosebleed that paints the entire swimming pool red.

=== Maria†Holic: Alive ===
No.	Title	Directed by	Written by	Storyboarded by	Original release date
1	"The Forbidden Women's Dorm"; Transliteration: "Kindan no Joshiryō" (Japanese: 禁断の女子寮)	Tomokazu Tokoro; Kenichi Ishikura	Masahiro Yokotani	Tomokazu Tokoro	April 8, 2011
Kanako Miyamae puts pâté instead of butter on her toast for breakfast, while running late for school. On the way to class, she stumbles across the abandoned girls first dormitory. After talking with Nanami Kiri, Yuzuru Inamori and Sachi Momoi about lovemaking rumors of the magnolia tree behind the girls first dormitory, Kanako decides to go there with them the next day in order to see the magnolia tree, despite Mariya Shidō and Matsurika Shinōji later warning Kanako of several traps that were set by students from Mihoshi no Mori. On the following day, Kanako, Nanami, Sachi, Yuzuru and even Ryūken Ishima end up entering the girls first dormitory in order to face a series of trials together. They face a scorching hot bathtub, a slot machine that summons Matsurika, a pitching target game, a carpeted treadmill and many other trials. Once they reach the end, they find the Dorm Leader, who willingly gives them the key to the courtyard. With Mariya and Matsurika waiting there, they all prepare to have afternoon tea under the magnolia tree. Kanako is distraught upon learning that she could have entered the courtyard through the emergency exit.
2	"Playing the Immoral Game"; Transliteration: "Ikenai Asobi" (Japanese: いけない遊び)	Yoshihiro Mori	Masahiro Yokotani	Yoshihiro Mori	April 15, 2011
2	"The Secret Entertainment"; Transliteration: "Himitsu no Settai" (Japanese: 秘密の接待)	Yoshihiro Mori	Masahiro Yokotani	Yoshihiro Mori	April 15, 2011
2	"A Shameful Reward"; Transliteration: "Shūchi no Hōshū" (Japanese: 羞恥の報酬)	Yoshihiro Mori	Masahiro Yokotani	Yoshihiro Mori	April 15, 2011
Having a case of déjà vu, Kanako recalls that the rainy season of summer may have already occurred. Kanako, Mariya, Matsurika, Ryūken, the Dorm Leader and her pet dog Yonakuni all gather in the dorm room in order to have Mariya's snacks and tea. When Ryūken, Mariya, Matsurika, Yonakuni and even Tōichirō Kanae break out their unique but unappealing card games, Kanako becomes overwhelmed. Afterwards, the Dorm Leader magically stops the rain, making the others speechless. Later on, Kanako is surprised that her side of the dorm room is dirty, while Mariya and Matsurika's side of the dorm room is secretly spotless, despite Mariya reading and Matsurika playing a video game. When Kanako asks for Mariya's help, Mariya summons Kanae to clean Kanako's side of the dorm room, while Kanako is in regret. During class, Nanami reveals to Kanako, Sachi and Yuzuru that she rewarded herself with new glass lenses for her glasses because of her good grades. After Sachi reveals that she rewarded herself with a tri-wing screwdriver, Yuzuru embarrassingly admits that she rewarded herself with a box of assorted chocolates. When Kanako asks Mariya for a reward in the dorm room, Kanae arrives in hopes of helping her.
3	"Greed's Tremor"; Transliteration: "Yokushin no Wananaki" (Japanese: 欲心のわななき)	Tatsufumi Itou	Miku Ooshima	Tatsufumi Itou	April 22, 2011
Kanako eventually realizes that she has gained weight due to eating Mariya's fattening desserts, much to the concern of Mariya and Matsurika. As a result, Kanako decides to skip dinner as part of her crash diet. The next day, Nanami, Sachi and Yuzuru are shocked that Kanako is eating dried shiitake for lunch. Nanami influences Kanako to sanitize her desert-dry mouth with Sachi's bag of marbles. During a student council meeting, Ayari Shiki discusses the cafeteria menu with Mariya and Ryūken, causing Kanako to go ballistic. Kanako's greedy behavior worsens after she unknowingly starves herself for the next three days. While Mariya and Matsurika leave the dorm room to have dinner one night, a frail Kanako goes to bed extremely hungry. However, she later goes sleepwalking in the hallway and attempts to devour Yonakuni, whose cry is heard by Ryūken and the Dorm Leader, though Kanako is only charged with property damage. As Kanako diets and exercises for an entire week, she manages to lose weight. Kanako is upset to learn from Mariya and Matsurika that she is not allowed to wear causal clothing on campus.
4	"The Captive Maiden"; Transliteration: "Toraware no Otome" (Japanese: 囚われの乙女)	Yoshihiro Mori	Masahiro Yokotani	Kenichi Ishikura	April 29, 2011
During homeroom class, Kumagai teaches about the jury system. Suddenly, Kanako is shot in the head with fake arrows, which conceal letters for jury duty summons in the girls second dormitory. In the dorm room, Kanako as the defendant is held captive and put on trial for the assault against Yonakuni as the plaintiff. Nanami, Sachi, Yuzuru and Ryūken are the jurors, while the Dorm Leader is the judge, Mariya is the prosecutor and Matsurika is the defense. Tonomura, Ayari and Honoka are called as witnesses in regards to the events leading up to Kanako's extreme starvation. As evidence, Mariya presents Honoka's expanding seaweed found inside Kanako's school bag, but Matsurika presents the school bag that contains the mysterious creature inside. The mysterious creature confirms that Kanako never opened the school bag in order to eat the expanding seaweed. Kanako fantasizes what would happen if she was found guilty, leading to thoughts between being a prisoner or a prison guard. When Kanako prepares to expose Mariya's secret, the Dorm Leader abruptly leaves. As punishment for the property damage, Kanako is forced to listen to Kanae's sermons all night long. Kanako later fails all of her finals due to being unprepared.
5	"Sullied Sisters"; Transliteration: "Kegasareta Shimai" (Japanese: 穢された姉妹)	Tomokazu Tokoro; Yuusuke Onoda	Masahiro Yokotani	Yoshihiro Mori	May 6, 2011
5	"Fingertip of Mischief"; Transliteration: "Tazura no Yubisaki" (Japanese: 悪戯な指先)	Tomokazu Tokoro; Yuusuke Onoda	Masahiro Yokotani	Yoshihiro Mori	May 6, 2011
Although Kanako believes that Ame no Kisaki has high standards, Mariya and Matsurika explain the accreditation of the California Institute of Technology, the college that Kanako's older sister attends abroad. Mariya and Matsurika encourage Kanako to review the study materials for the upcoming resit finals. Afterwards, Mariya and Matsurika hang out with Yuzuru and archery club members Chifumi Satsuki, Komachi Yamaki and Banri Tsumugi at the archery training hall, where it is revealed that Yuzuru was previously roped into joining the archery club. The Dorm Leader catches Kanako trying to peep into the archery training hall. When Mariya and Matsurika return to the dorm room, the Dorm Leader informs them that Kanako will be imprisoned in a time chamber for an entire week. After Kanako is released, she believes that a year slipped through her fingers. However, she discovers that many fads have started during her absence. Ayari used rhinestone embellishments on personal items for Nanami, Sachi and Yuzuru, while Honoka created a mori hairstyle for Ei Hitotsubashi and Mii Habutae. After Kanako takes her resit finals, Ryūken introduces Kanako to a card game that teaches about historic Japanese battles. Kanako is ultimately punished for losing in a mandatory tournament.
6	"Heart Pounding Mission: School Scramble!"; Transliteration: "Dokiwaku☆Misshon Sukūru☆Sukuranburu" (Japanese: ドキワク☆ミッションすくーる☆すくらんぶる)	Yuusuke Onoda	Miku Ooshima	Yuuichi Nakazawa	May 13, 2011
This episode is set during the week when Kanako was imprisoned in the time chamber. The Dorm Leader tells Ryūken that Mariya is visiting family. After inventing a card game that teaches about historic Japanese battles, Kumagai discusses with Tonomura about the rise of reki-jo. Mariya and Matsurika make a business offer with Kumagai. Nanami, Sachi and Yuzuru are informed of Kanako's absence. Sachi places a flower and Kanako's photo on Kanako's classroom desk, though giving the wrong impression. Honoka notices Ryūken's rhinestone hairpin and is motivated to become a hairstylist when Ryūken wishes for a mori hairstyle. Mariya and the Dorm Leader discuss ground rules for an upcoming tournament of the card game. Maki witnesses Ayari decorating Kanako's classroom desk with rhinestone embellishments. Mariya and Matsurika encounter Kanae, who believes that Kanako has committed suicide. Kanae later falls into a trap outside the Shidō residence set by Shizu's butler Rindō Shinōji. After being released and dressed in a bathrobe, Kanae reflects whether or not Shizu is really a boy. Kanae passes by Mariya and Matsurika at a fountain without giving any explanation. When a terrified Maki sees Kanae in his bathrobe at the girls dormitory, she scrambles to Ayari.
7	"The REAL Swimming Competition Full of Pretty Girls"; Transliteration: "Shin ・ Bishōjo Darake no Suiei Daikai" (Japanese: 真・美少女だらけの水泳大会)	Susumu Endou (Note: Assisted by Yoshihiro Mori.)	Masahiro Yokotani	Yoshihiro Mori; Yuuichi Nakazawa	May 20, 2011
When Mariya and Matsurika visit Shizu and Rindō at the Shidō residence, it is revealed that Mariya is three centimeters shorter than Shizu. As Mariya and Shizu discuss the "wardrobe malfunction incident" that occurred during the swimming competition before summer break, Matsurika and Rindō remind them about the terms of their late grandmother's will, though Kanako is the only exception against the terms. Meanwhile, Kanako falls into a trap outside the Shidō residence set by Rindō. When Kanako is finally released, she apologizes for the intrusion and the incident. The next day, Kanako is woken up by Shizu, who explains that Mariya is attending a swimming competition at Mihoshi no Mori. As Kanako fantasizes about spending time with Shizu, their time is cut short when homeroom class begins. Nanami, Sachi and Yuzuru later inform Kanako about the swimming competition at Mihoshi no Mori. Kanako bribes the Dorm Leader with Honoka's sashimi in order to obtain the key to the emergency exit of the girls first dormitory and cut through to the swimming pool at Mihoshi no Mori. However, she arrives just when the swimming competition is underway, and Rindō forces her to be a judge.
8	"Sullied Innocence"; Transliteration: "Kegasareta Junshin" (Japanese: 汚された純真)	Masaya Sasaki	Masahiro Yokotani	Hitoyuki Matsui	May 27, 2011
Mariya and Matsurika inform Kanako that she is required to take prep classes during summer school. After knowing that other students will voluntarily attend summer school as well, Kanako fantasizes about a tutoring session with Kumagai. Kanako then realizes that Ryūken, Yuzuru and Honoka each want to study hard in order to achieve their future dreams. With Sachi's birthday coming up the next day, Kanako is surprised that the other students are planning a birthday party for Sachi during the summer. Mariya and Matsurika confiscate Kanako's photo album containing many candid photos of Sachi. At the church, a ceremony is given in Sachi's honor. Kanako has intended to give Sachi a present, revealed as an erotic devil-themed lingerie set, but Mariya and Matsurika confiscate this as well. As Sachi receives amazing presents from her friends, Kanako realizes that she was pushing her desires onto Sachi and ends up running off in tears. When Sachi later finds Kanako in the park, it turns out that Sachi received Kanako's photo album as a present, thanks to Mariya and Matsurika. Soon after, Mariya and Matsurika punish Kanako by revoking her right to talk during the next episode.
9	"The Precocious Fiance"; Transliteration: "Sōjuku no Konyakusha" (Japanese: 早熟の婚約者)	Yoshihiro Mori	Miku Ooshima	Yoshihiro Mori	June 3, 2011
Just when Ryūken and Chifumi make plans to visit the bookstore, a precocious ten-year-old boy named Tōta Hanabusa arrives on campus and calls Kanae a stag beetle. During lunch, Mariya, Matsurika, Kanako and Chifumi learn that Tōta is betrothed to Ryūken. Rindō, the Dorm Leader and Yonakuni provide commentary for the emotional status of Kanako, who has been forced to wear a cloth face mask for the entire episode. Mariya and Matsurika leave with Chifumi, who drags Kanako away from the scene. As Ryūken and Tōta take a walk in the park, Tōta discreetly uses tweezers in order to search inside a tree hollow for rare stag beetles. Tōta becomes upset when Ryūken tells him that the engagement was a joke made by her grandparents. While trying to approach Ryūken and Tōta, an envious Kanako is interrupted by Ayari and Maki. After getting a nosebleed on her cloth face mask, Kanako flees into the woods, then runs to Ryūken and Tōta, gesturing a stag beetle collection battle with Tōta. As the sun sets, the battle ends in a draw, and Tōta gives Ryūken a study-dedicated omamori before departing from campus.
10	"The Holy Man's Scapegoat"; Transliteration: "Seishokusha no Ikenie" (Japanese: 聖職者の生贄)	Yuusuke Onoda	Masahiro Yokotani	Kenichi Ishikura; Yuuichi Nakazawa	June 10, 2011
10	"The Feast in the Wet Dream"; Transliteration: "Inmu no Utage" (Japanese: 淫夢の宴)	Yuusuke Onoda	Masahiro Yokotani	Kenichi Ishikura; Yuuichi Nakazawa	June 10, 2011
10	"The Forbidden Relationship"; Transliteration: "Kinjirareta Kankei" (Japanese: 禁じられた関係)	Yuusuke Onoda	Masahiro Yokotani	Kenichi Ishikura; Yuuichi Nakazawa	June 10, 2011
10	"The Nape in the Summer"; Transliteration: "Natsu no Unaji" (Japanese: 夏のうなじ)	Yuusuke Onoda	Masahiro Yokotani	Kenichi Ishikura; Yuuichi Nakazawa	June 10, 2011
Kanako is given a rosary previously owned by Matsurika's father, but it burdens Kanako with the curse of having nightmares of a little girl. Kanae arrives in the dorm room, using various holy yet unorthodox methods to improve her sleep. Kanako loses consciousness after Kanae resorts to lying in bed with her. As a token of appreciation, Mariya gives Kanae the same rosary, leading to him having nightmares of the little girl. Kanako starts thinking of the little girl, prompting Matsurika to give Kanako various items to stimulate her dreams, though they all turn out to be items that reflect a specific taste. In the park, Kanae heard the rumor that the rosary is cursed. As Kanae mumbles on, Kanako finds him and asks for the rosary. Kanae believes that he is in a forbidden love triangle with Kanako and the little girl. The Dorm Leader arrives to confiscate the rosary from Kanae, claiming it was her rosary to begin with. Kanako, Mariya, Matsurika, Nanami, Sachi, Yuzuru, Ryūken, Chifumi, Komachi, the Dorm Leader and Yonakuni dress in yukatas as they all attend the summer event in order to watch the fireworks together.
11	"The Younger Sister's Juicy Secret"; Transliteration: "Imōto no Himitsu" (Japanese: 妹の秘蜜)	Masaya Sasaki	Masahiro Yokotani	Yoshihiro Mori	June 17, 2011
Kanako's younger sister Miki Miyamae visits Ame no Kisaki. She arrives at the dorm room, giving a rosary to Kanako and showing Kanako's old elementary school graduation essay to Mariya. During Modern Japanese class, Kanae reflects on his dream of becoming a good husband. After class, Kanako encounters Miki in the park, where Miki explains that late academy headmistress Irene Shidō introduced Miki to Mariya when they were children. Tonomura takes Kanako and Miki to the archery training hall, where they hang out with the archery club members. Miki tells the others how she watched Mariya during archery practice when they were children. Bringing Miki to the fountain, an irritated Kanako exploits the fact that Mariya is really a boy. Mariya hears this and brushes it off as a prank, even when Kanako begs for forgiveness. However, Miki has Mariya touch Kanako, who breaks out in hives. Though Kanako and Matsurika watch nearby, Mariya privately admits to Miki that he is a boy, but Miki still confesses her love for Mariya and promises to join the archery club someday. Despite Mariya brushing this off gracefully, Miki leaves campus with the intention of enrolling at Ame no Kisaki next year.
12	"Kanako's Birthday!"; Transliteration: "Kanako-san no Tanjō-bi" (Japanese: かなこさんの誕生日)	Yoshihiro Mori	Nahoko Hasegawa	Kenichi Ishikura	June 24, 2011
Kanako continues studying in the study hall, which is right next to the girls public bath, though she is forbidden to enter. In the dorm room, Kanako explains to Mariya and Matsurika that her birthday is approaching on August 31st, the last day of summer school. Kanako tries to drop many subtle hints, and news of this reaches Nanami, Sachi, Yuzuru, Honoka, Tonomura, Kumagai, Ryūken, the Dorm Leader, Yonakuni, Shizu, Rindō and Kanae over the course of three days. However, they all plan different surprise birthday parties for Kanako. On the day of Kanako's birthday, Mariya and Matsurika find Kanako alone in the girls public bath. Kanako places the rosary in the altar, which transports all three of them underground. Mariya makes Kanako realize how selfish she acted, especially ignoring Kanae's invitation to the church. The expanding seaweed hidden underground starts to gush out, leading Kanako through a series of trials towards the church. All of Kanako's friends and acquaintances have gathered to throw a ceremony in Kanako's honor. Mariya gives Kanako a kiss on the cheek as a present, causing Kanako to break out in hives.
