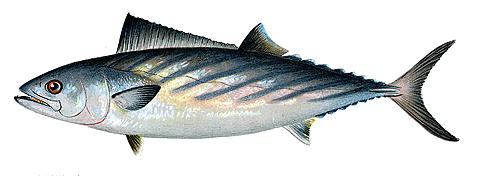
- Atlantic bonito, Sarda sarda

Scientific classification
- Kingdom: Animalia
- Phylum: Chordata
- Class: Actinopterygii
- Division: Teleostei
- Order: Scombriformes
- Family: Scombridae
- Subfamily: Scombrinae
- Tribe: Sardini; Jordan and Evermann, 1896

Genera
- Cybiosarda (Whitley, 1935); Gymnosarda Gill, 1862; Orcynopsis Gill, 1862; Sarda (Cuvier, 1832)

= Bonito =

Tribe of fishes

Bonitos are a tribe of medium-sized, ray-finned, predatory fish in the family Scombridae, which it shares with the mackerel, tuna, and Spanish mackerel tribes, and also the butterfly kingfish. Also called the tribe Sardini, it consists of eight species across four genera; three of those four genera are monotypic, having a single species each. Bonitos closely resemble the skipjack tuna, which is often called a bonito, especially in Japanese contexts.

== Etymology ==
The fish's name comes from the Spanish or Portuguese bonito (no evidence has been found for the origin of the name), identical to the adjective meaning "pretty", but the noun referring to the fish seems to come from the low and medieval Latin form boniton, a word with a strange structure and an obscure origin, related to the word byza, a possible borrowing from the Greek βῦζα, "owl".

== Species ==
- Genus Sarda (Cuvier, 1832)
  - Australian bonito, S. australis (Macleay, 1881)
  - S. chiliensis (Cuvier, 1832)
    - Eastern Pacific bonito, S. c. chiliensis (Cuvier, 1832)
    - Pacific bonito, S. c. lineolata (Girard, 1858)
  - Striped bonito, S. orientalis (Temminck & Schlegel, 1844)
  - Atlantic bonito, S. sarda (Bloch, 1793)
- Genus Cybiosarda (Whitley, 1935)
  - Leaping bonito, C. elegans (Whitley, 1935)
- Genus Gymnosarda Gill, 1862
  - Dogtooth tuna, G. unicolor (Rüppell, 1836)
- Genus Orcynopsis Gill, 1862
  - Plain bonito, O. unicolor (Geoffroy Saint-Hilaire, 1817)

== As food ==
Pacific and Atlantic bonito meat has a firm texture and a darkish color, as well as a moderate fat content. The meat of young or small bonito can be of light color, close to that of skipjack tuna, and is sometimes used as a cheap substitute for skipjack, especially for canning purposes, and occasionally in the production of cheap varieties of katsuobushi that are sold as "bonito flakes". Bonito may not, however, be marketed as tuna in all countries. The Atlantic bonito is also found in the Mediterranean and the Black Seas, where it is a popular food fish, eaten grilled, pickled (lakerda), or baked.

== See also ==
- Hiragonic acid
- Other fish sometimes called "bonito" include skipjack tuna, Katsuwonus pelamis
