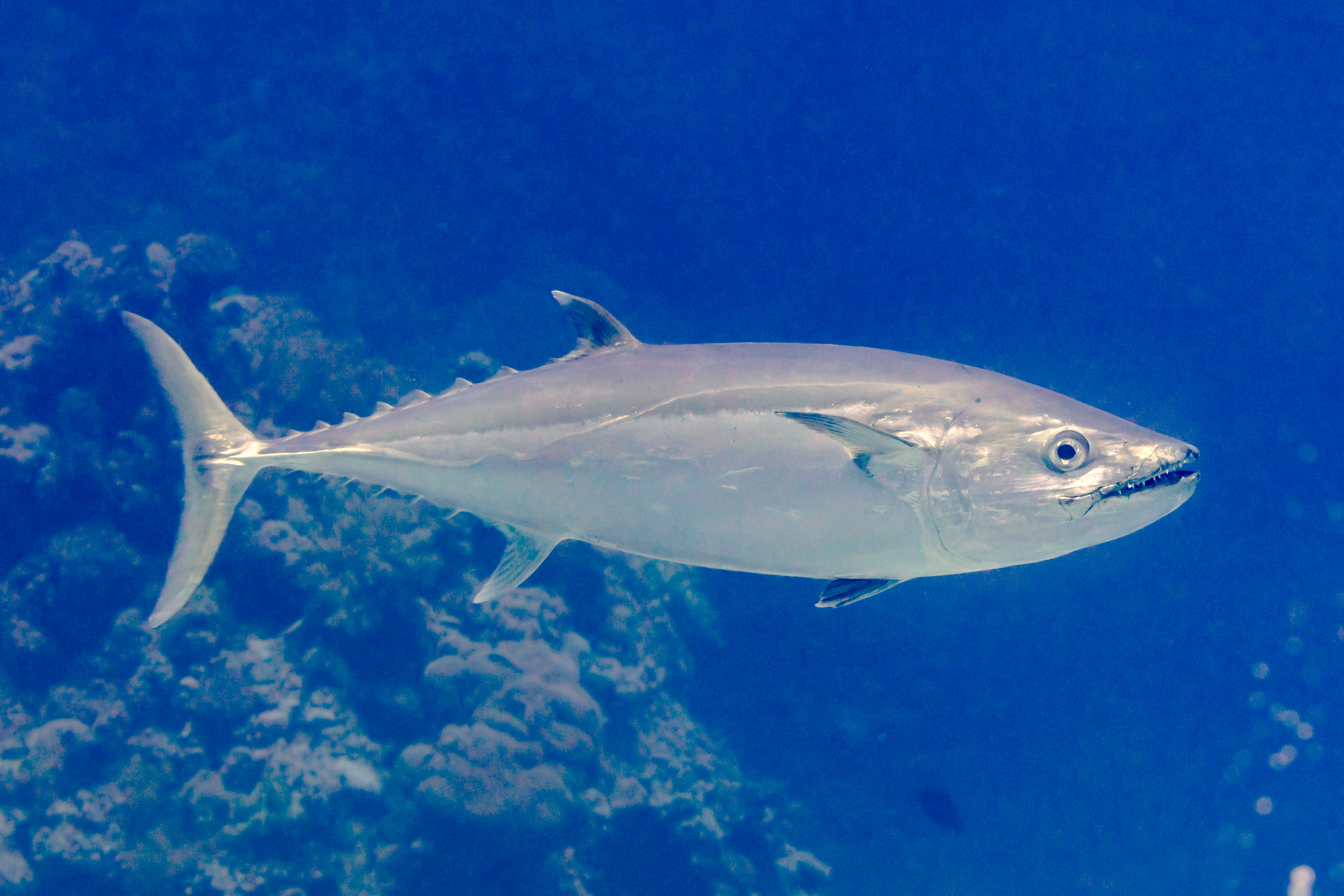
- Gymnosarda unicolor from French Polynesia

Conservation status
- Least Concern (IUCN 3.1)

Scientific classification
- Kingdom: Animalia
- Phylum: Chordata
- Class: Actinopterygii
- Order: Scombriformes
- Family: Scombridae
- Genus: Gymnosarda; Gill, 1862
- Species: G. unicolor

Binomial name
- Gymnosarda unicolor (Rüppell, 1836)

Synonyms
- List: Gymnosarda nuda (Günther, 1860); Pelamys nud a Günther, 1860; Scomber vau Curtiss, 1938; Thynnus unicolor Rüppell, 1836

= Dogtooth tuna =

Dogtooth tuna Temporal range: Early Eocene to present

Species of fish

The dogtooth tuna (Gymnosarda unicolor), also known as white tuna, is a species of pelagic marine fish which belongs to the family Scombridae. Despite the name "tuna", it is not actually a tuna. Instead, it is a bonito.

== Evolution ==
Two fossil species of Gymnosarda are known, suggesting that the genus has existed since the Early Eocene. †Gymnosarda prisca Monsch, 2000 is known from the Early Eocene-aged London Clay of England and the later Eocene-aged deposits of Mangyshlak in Kazakhstan. The remains of this species were previously confused with the co-occurring extinct Spanish mackerel species †Scomberomorus saevus. †Gymnosarda delheidi (Leriche, 1905) is also known from the London Clay, the Early Eocene-aged Nanjemoy Formation of Maryland, US, and the Lutetian-aged Gosport Sand of Alabama, US. This species was previously placed in the genus Sarda. The widespread distribution of Gymnosarda in the Atlantic region during the Eocene, where it is no longer found, contrasts with its present distribution in the Indo-Pacific.

Indeterminate fossil remains of Gymnosarda are also known from the Oligocene of Hungary & Romania, and the Late Miocene-aged Bahia Inglesa Formation of Chile.

== Description ==
The dogtooth tuna can reach a length of 190 to 248 centimetres (75 to 98 in) in males and a weight of 130 kilograms (287 lb). The average length commonly observed is around 40 to 120 centimetres (16 to 47 in). They have 12 to 14 dorsal soft rays and 12 to 13 anal soft rays. The lateral line undulates strongly. These large tunas have a streamlined shape and a distinctive body coloration: brilliant blue green on the back, silvery on the side, and whitish on the belly, with two white tips on the two back fins close to the caudal peduncle. They always swim with open jaws. The upper jaw of the large mouth reaches the eye.

== Distribution ==
The dogtooth tuna is widespread throughout the tropical waters of the Indo-Pacific area from the eastern coast of Africa, Red Sea included, to French Polynesia and oceanic islands of the Pacific Ocean (Hawaii excluded), north to Japan, south to Australia.

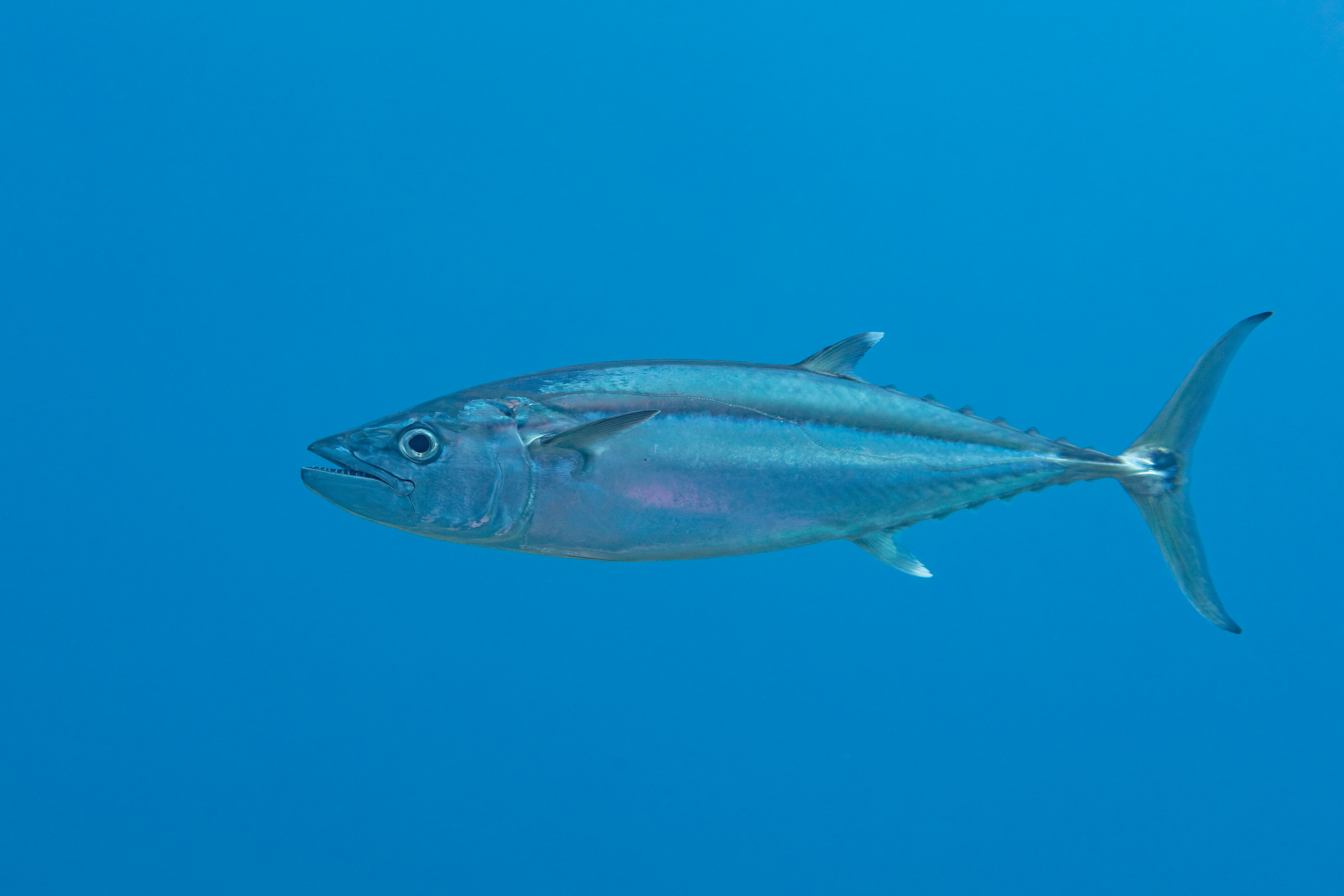
Gymnosarda unicolor at Madagascar

== Ecology ==
These offshore fishes can be found mainly in reef environments with smaller fish being more commonly found near shallow reef areas and larger ones haunting deep reef drop off areas, seamounts and steep underwater walls. Usually they are solitary or occur in small schools, to a depth of 10 to 300 metres (33 to 984 ft).

The dogtooth tuna is one of the apex non-pelagic predators in its environment, sharing that position with giant trevally, Napoleon wrasse, and large groupers, as well as large sharks such as reef, bull and tiger sharks.

These aggressive opportunistic predators feed on small schooling fishes and squids, and are capable of taking a wide variety of prey items. In most areas, the mainstay of its diet probably consists of pelagic schooling fish found near reef habitat (mainly, Caesio, Cirrhilabrus, Pterocaesio, carangids such as rainbow runners and Decapterus, mackerel scad, and scombrids).

Preliminary estimates of longevity indicate a maximum observed age of at least 20 years.

== Fishing ==
These fishes are usually marketed canned and frozen. Adults may be ciguatoxic. The dogtooth tuna is appreciated in most of its range as a fine food fish and also as a game fish sought by both rod and reel anglers and spearfishermen. Dogtooth tuna used to be mostly taken as an incidental catch by anglers trolling for other gamefish - with natural baits for black marlin, for instance, or with lures for wahoo and Spanish (narrowbarred) mackerel. In the last 10 to 15 years there has been more dedicated effort directed at this species because of its rarity and sporting qualities. Dogtooth tuna are now a highly coveted prize by many European and Asian sports anglers. Large specimens are seldom found where there is significant fishing pressure and can be one of the most difficult gamefish to capture.

Their habit of making high-speed downward runs when hooked, even on heavy tackle, often sees the line being cut as it contacts deep bottom structure. Sharks frequently mutilate both hooked and speared fish during the later stages of the fight, adding to the difficulty in landing them. The majority of dogtooth tuna captures have tended to be made by trolling with dead and live baits or with lures, particularly deep-swimming plugs.

These techniques are still often used, with one niche specialty being the use of live bait such as rainbow runners to tease dogtooth tuna within range of light tackle and fly-casting anglers. High speed jigging with a variety of metal lures has increased tremendously in popularity in the last several years as advancements in tackle technology have resulted in lightweight rods and reels that are capable of handling heavy spectra-type braided lines. Some of the more popular destinations for anglers seeking this species include Okinawa and other islands of southern Japan, Rodrigues and other Indian Ocean islands such as the Maldives, Andaman & Nicobar Islands, Bali and elsewhere in Nusa Tenggara in Indonesia, the Great Barrier Reef and its outlying atolls, and many Western Pacific islands such as Vanuatu, Fiji, Tonga, Samoa and Palau.
