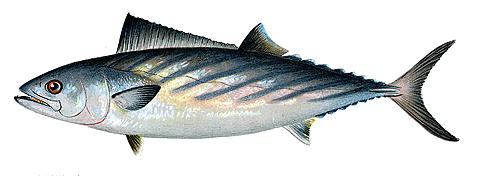

Conservation status
- Least Concern (IUCN 3.1)

Scientific classification
- Kingdom: Animalia
- Phylum: Chordata
- Class: Actinopterygii
- Order: Scombriformes
- Family: Scombridae
- Genus: Sarda
- Species: S. sarda

Binomial name
- Sarda sarda (Bloch, 1793)

Synonyms
- Scomber sarda Bloch, 1793; Palamita sarda (Bloch, 1793); Pelamis sarda (Bloch, 1793); Pelamys sarda (Bloch, 1793); Thynnus sardus (Bloch, 1793); Sarda pelamis (Brünnich, 1768); Scomber mediterraneus Bloch & Schneider, 1801; Sarda mediterranea (Bloch & Schneider, 1801); Scomber palamitus Rafinesque, 1810; Scomber ponticus Pallas, 1814; Thynnus brachypterus Cuvier, 1829

= Atlantic bonito =

Species of fish

The Atlantic bonito (Sarda sarda) is a large mackerel-like fish of the family Scombridae. It is common in shallow waters of the Atlantic Ocean, the Mediterranean Sea, and the Black Sea, where it is an important commercial and game fish.

== Description ==
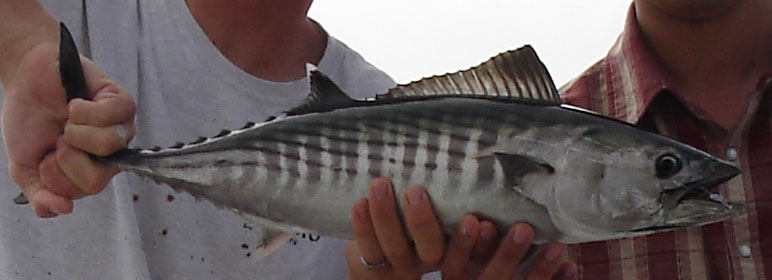
Atlantic bonito, Sarda sarda

Atlantic bonito belong to a group which have the dorsal fins very near, or separated by a narrow interspace. Its body is completely scaled, with those scales in the pectoral fin area and the lateral line usually larger in size. Bonitos (fishes in the genus Sarda) differ from tuna by their compressed bodies, their lack of teeth on the roof of the mouth, and certain differences in colouration.

Atlantic bonito share Atlantic waters with the striped bonito, Sarda orientalis (the Atlantic population of which is sometimes considered a separate species, Sarda velox). The striped bonito has been taken on the Atlantic coast as far north as Cape Cod. It is similar in its habits, but somewhat smaller than the more common Atlantic bonito. The Atlantic bonito can be distinguished from its relative by its dark oblique stripes on the back and with a maxillary only about half as long as the head, whereas the striped bonito has striping on its topside nearly horizontal and a maxillary more than half the length of the head.

Atlantic bonito grow up to 75 centimetres (30 in) and weigh 5–6 kilograms (11–13 lb) at this size. The world record, 18 pounds 4 ounces (8.3 kg), was caught in the Azores.

== Habits ==
It is a strong swimmer. Normally, it travels in fairly large schools and is common offshore in the vicinity of New York City, where it is known as "skipjack" because of its habit of jumping from the water. (However, the name "skipjack" more commonly refers to the skipjack tuna, Katsuwonus pelamis.) The spawning season is June, and specimens 12–15 centimetres (4.7–5.9 in) long are taken in September off Long Island.

== Diet ==
Atlantic bonito eat mackerel, menhaden, alewives, silversides, sand lances, and other fishes, as well as squid.

== Fishing technique ==
Bonito are often captured by tuna fishermen when trolling for bigger game. Bonito have also been caught using pound nets, and amongst other species as bycatch during the traditional fishing practice of Almadraba in addition to the main catch, the far larger Atlantic bluefin tuna. Thought by most fishermen to be inferior to tuna as a food fish, possibly because of the greater oiliness, it is sometimes used as bait.

== As food ==
Landings of Atlantic bonito in thousand tonnes from 1950 to 2022

Bonito is a popular food fish in the Mediterranean; its flesh is similar to tuna and mackerel, and its size is intermediate between the two.

Bonito under 1 kg (2.2 lb) or so (called palamut ~ паламуд in Bulgarian) are often grilled as steaks. Larger bonito (torik in Turkish) are cut into steaks and preserved as lakerda. Bonito is also canned, but canned bonito del norte (Spanish) is not bonito, but albacore tuna.

In Algeria and Spain, it is often prepared as escabeche, which preserves it for about a week. Bonito may also be baked and served cold.
