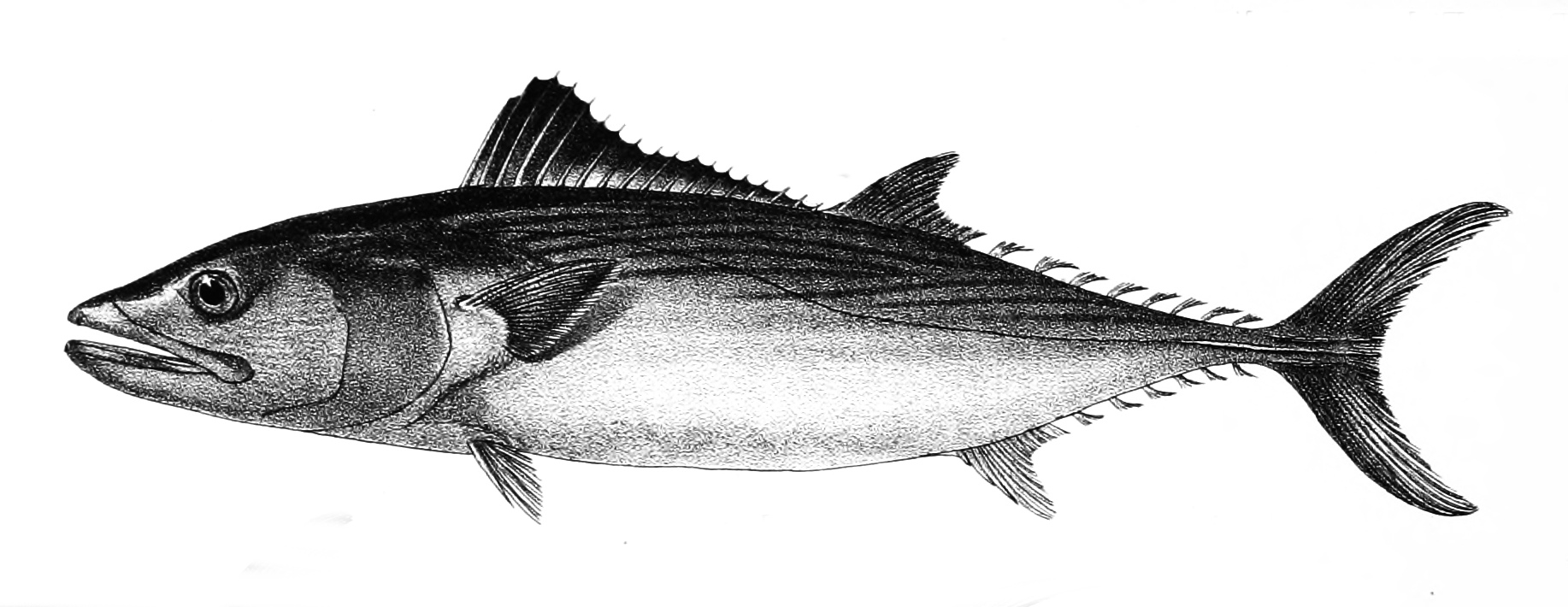

Conservation status
- Least Concern (IUCN 3.1)

Scientific classification
- Kingdom: Animalia
- Phylum: Chordata
- Class: Actinopterygii
- Order: Scombriformes
- Family: Scombridae
- Genus: Sarda
- Species: S. chiliensis

Binomial name
- Sarda chiliensis (Cuvier in Cuvier and Valenciennes, 1832)

Synonyms
- Sarda stockii David, 1943; Pelamys chiliensis Cuvier, 1832

= Sarda chiliensis =

Eastern Pacific bonito

Species of ray-finned fish

Sarda chiliensis, the eastern Pacific bonito, is a marine species of bonito. It ranges from Ecuador to Chile. Sarda lineolata, which ranges from Alaska to Mexico was formerly considered a subspecies, as Sarda chiliensis lineolata, but this treatment renders the species geographically disjunct.
