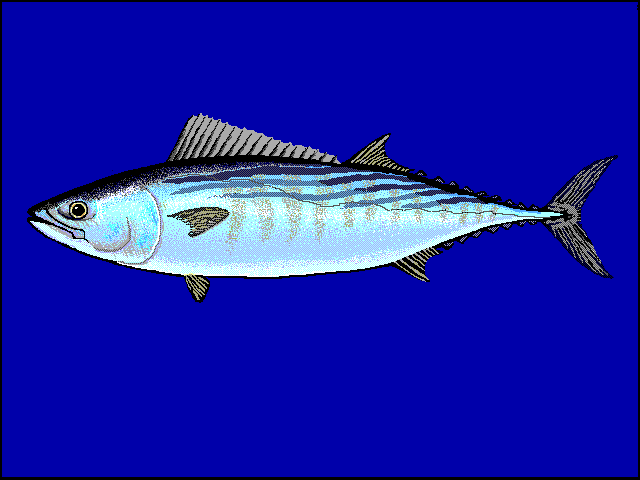

Scientific classification
- Kingdom: Animalia
- Phylum: Chordata
- Class: Actinopterygii
- Division: Teleostei
- Order: Scombriformes
- Family: Scombridae
- Genus: Sarda
- Species: S. lineolata

Binomial name
- Sarda lineolata (Girard, 1858)

Synonyms
- Pelamys lineolata Girard, 1858

= Pacific bonito =

Species of ray-finned fish

Pacific bonito, Sarda lineolata, is a marine, pelagic species of bonito found along the Pacific coast of the United States, Mexico, Peru, and Chile, They are popular as a game fish and commercially important.

Sarda lineolata was thought to be a subspecies of Sarda chiliensis due to the large separation in their range. However, genetic analysis has shown that they are likely the same species.

== Description ==
The Pacific Bonito is colored blue to violet above, with metallic luster becoming silvery ventrally. It has ten or eleven stripes on its back running obliquely from the dorsum forward, and fifteen or more rakers below the angle on the first gill. The first dorsal fin is contiguous with the second and longer than the head. The caudal peduncle is slender, and the body entirely scaled. It has no teeth on the vomer. It has a small keel on either side of the median keel on the sides of the caudal peduncle, and six to eight finlets on the dorsal and ventral surfaces of the caudal peduncle.

The maximum size is a length of 48 in (120 cm) and weight of 25 lb (11 kg).

When off the California coast, it is easy to identify these fish because they are the only tuna-like fish in this area that have dark slanted stripes on their dorsal side.

== Distribution and habitat ==
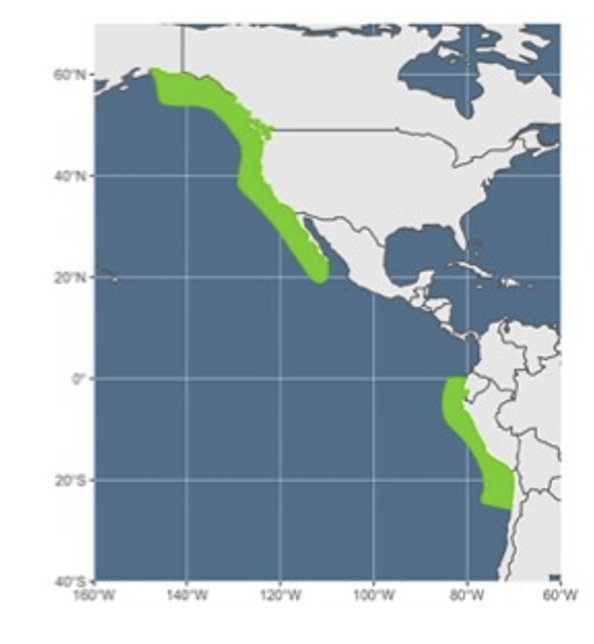
Geographic Distribution of Pacific bonito

The Pacific bonito has two separate populations with different ranges. The Northern population is typically found between Southern California and Central Baja California. However, they can be found as far North as Southern Alaska in warmer years. The Southern population can be found off the coast of Northern Peru to Chile. The species can be found up to several hundred miles off the coast, but is most abundant in areas 15 miles (24 km) or less off the coast.

Pacific bonito usually travel in schools in the open ocean and live up to depths of 110 m (360 ft). This species are considered highly migratory, and migrates up the coast with the seasons. They can migrate up to 600 miles (970 km) and move south in the winter where temperatures are warmer and north for the summer.

Mature Pacific bonito are most commonly found in open ocean environments. Younger individuals are more often found in shallower areas such as kelp forests where they have places to hide, additionally being found inside harbors and bays.

== Diet ==
Fish and squid are the main diet of the Pacific bonito, primarily the Northern anchovy and market squid. They have also been known to eat rockfish, hake, sardines, saury and mackerel. From January to June, during their spawning season, they have been found to eat equal amounts of mackerel and squid.

== Conservation status ==
Pacific bonito are a fast-growing species which makes them more resilient to overfishing. Currently, their population is believed to be in stable condition. Not much information on their status is currently known, and more research will need to be done to know for sure. Estimating the overall health of this species is also difficult due to populations not remaining in the same place for long, and population sizes fluctuating with seasons.

== Human interactions and ecosystem role ==
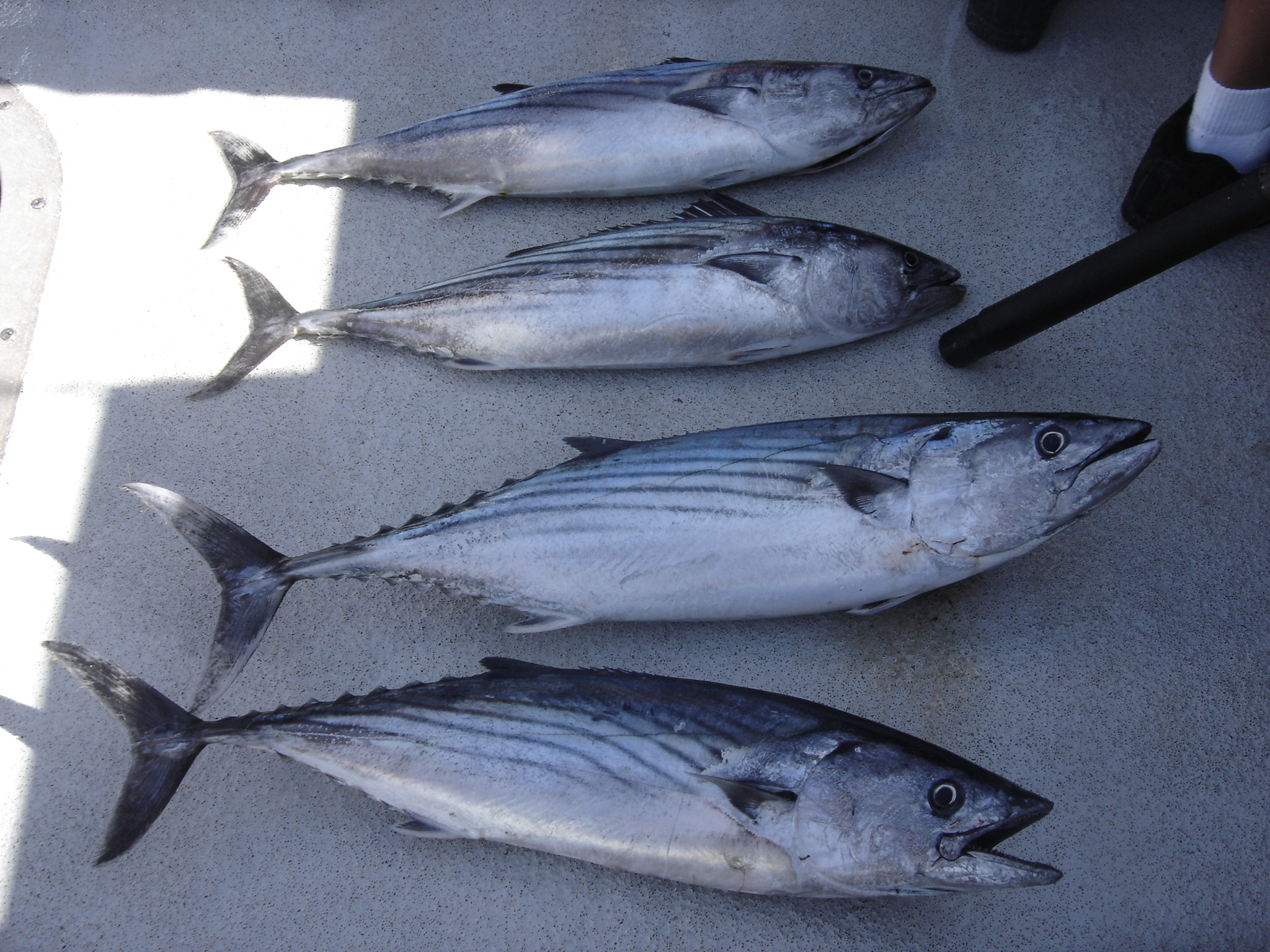
Recently caught Pacific bonito

In commercial markets, it is caught by trolling or purse seine nets.

Recreationally, fishing using feather lures, spoons, or live bait is popular for the species.

This species can be a good meal for recreational anglers, but requires immediate preparation due to the nature of the bonito's quickly spoiling meat.

Although there is not a lot of information about this species’ role in the ocean, it does serve as a food source for predators such as swordfish, bluefin tuna, striped marlin, sea lions, and dolphins as well as some sharks.

== Lifecycle and reproduction ==
Pacific bonito have an average lifespan of 6-8 years in the wild.

Females are larger than males at maturity at around 55 cm (22 in) vs 50 cm (20 in). However, males reach maturity around two years sooner, at three years compared to one.This species has been observed performing some courtship behavior and has been observed releasing gametes simultaneously after swimming together in a circle. Pacific bonito can spawn multiple years and begin spawning earlier in the season the older they get. They produce eggs which are free floating and take around three days to hatch. They exhibit slight sexual dimorphism during mating and courtship, but only during those times and are otherwise indistinguishable, along with others in the genus Sarda.

== Impacts of climate change ==
In typical years, the Northern part of this species’ population resides in Southern California during spring and summer. They can be found farther north during El Niño, but not during normal years. The changing climate may shift their range further north for the foreseeable future. They may also decide not to travel south at all if waters stay warm enough. Becoming resident (common in an area year round) has been witnessed in individuals in this species in the past near warm water discharge from powerplants, so this species becoming resident in more northern ranges with increased ocean temperatures is entirely possible.
