= Hiragonic acid =

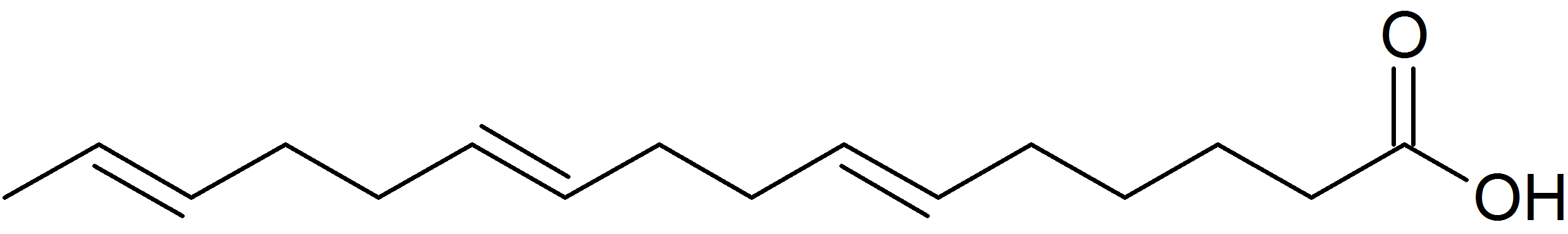

Names
- IUPAC name (6E,10E,14E)hexadeca-6,10,14-trienoic acid
- Other names C16:3n-2,6,10

Identifiers
CAS Number	4444-12-6
3D model (JSmol)	Interactive image
ChEBI	CHEBI:180366
ChemSpider	4445939
PubChem CID	5282812
CompTox Dashboard (EPA)	DTXSID40712155
- InChI: InChI=1S/C16H26O2/c1-2-3-4-5-6-7-8-9-10-11-12-13-14-15-16(17)18/h2-3,6-7,10-11H,4-5,8-9,12-15H2,1H3,(H,17,18)/b3-2+,7-6+,11-10+ Key: ZKCRKOCVERWCLP-DJWHJZFYSA-N
- SMILES: CC=CCCC=CCCC=CCCCCC(=O)O

Properties
Chemical formula	C_{16}H_{26}O_{2}
Molar mass	250.382 g·mol^{−1}
- Except where otherwise noted, data are given for materials in their standard state (at 25 °C [77 °F], 100 kPa). Infobox references

Hiragonic acid is a linear fatty acid with 16 carbon atoms and three double bonds in the trans-configuration. The compound is also a polyunsaturated carboxylic acid; its molecular formula is C_{16}H_{26}O_{2}.

== Discovery and natural occurrence ==
The acid was identified in 1929 by Japanese researchers Yoshiyuki Toyama and Tomotaro Tsuchyia in the oil of Japanese sardine (Clupanodon melanostica). In 1935, its structure was clarified by the same researchers who also proposed the current name—derived from the Japanese word for sardine: hirago. The acid was subsequently isolated in the oil of bonito and in the red alga Hypnea musciformis.

Some studies have identified hiragonic acid in Pongamia pinnata seed oil.

== Properties ==
At room temperature between 4 °C and 20 °C, the acid forms a yellow liquid with a density of 0.9288 g/cm³ and a refractive index of 1.4855 at 20 °C. The compound is soluble in acetone, ethanol, diethyl ether, and methanol.

There are doubts about the all-trans configuration of hiragonic acid. Some authors attribute the name "hiragonic acid" to other positional or cis-isomers of hexadecatrienoic acid.
