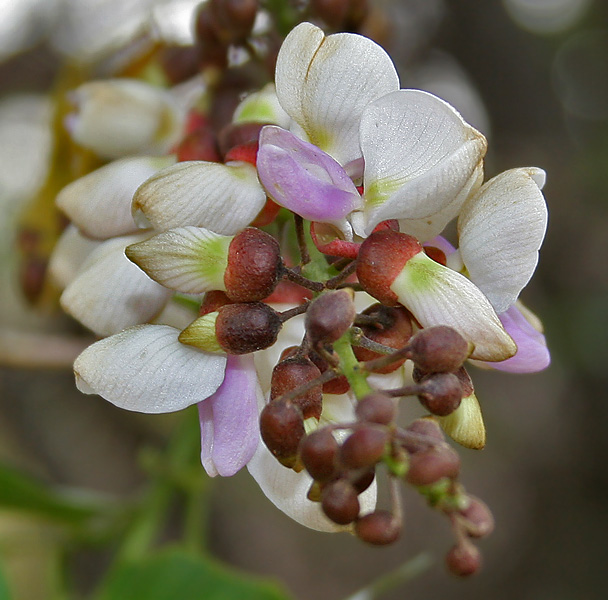
- Flowers

Conservation status
- Least Concern (IUCN 3.1)

Scientific classification
- Kingdom: Plantae
- Clade: Tracheophytes
- Clade: Angiosperms
- Clade: Eudicots
- Clade: Rosids
- Order: Fabales
- Family: Fabaceae
- Subfamily: Faboideae
- Genus: Pongamia
- Species: P. pinnata

Binomial name
- Pongamia pinnata (L.) Pierre

Varieties
- Pongamia pinnata var. minor (Benth.) Domin; Pongamia pinnata var. pinnata

Synonyms
- List: Cajum pinnatum (L.) Kuntze (1891); Cytisus pinnatus L. (1753); Galedupa pinnata (L.) Taub. (1894); Millettia pinnata (L.) Panigrahi (1989); Pongamia glabra Vent. (1803), nom. superfl.; Pongamia pinnata var. typica Domin (1926), not validly publ.; Derris indica (Lam.) Bennet

= Pongamia pinnata =

Species of tree

Pongamia pinnata is a species of tree in the pea family Fabaceae, native to eastern and tropical Asia, Australia, and the Pacific islands. It is often known by the synonym Millettia pinnata. Its common names include Indian beech, Karanja, and Pongame oiltree.

== Description ==
Pongamia pinnata is a legume tree that grows to about 15–25 m (50–80 ft) in height with a large canopy which spreads equally wide and creates dense shade. It may be deciduous for short periods. It has a straight or crooked trunk, 50–80 cm (20–30 in) in diameter, with grey-brown bark, which is smooth or vertically fissured. Its wood is white. Branches are glabrous with pale stipulate scars. The imparipinnate leaves of the tree alternate and are short-stalked, rounded, or cuneate at the base; ovate or oblong along the length; obtuse-acuminate at the apex; and not toothed on the edges. They are a soft, shiny burgundy when young and mature to a glossy, deep green as the season progresses, with prominent veins underneath.

Flowering generally starts after 3–4 years with small clusters of white, purple, and pink flowers, which can be produced throughout the year. The raceme-like inflorescences bear two to four flowers that are strongly fragrant and grow to be 15–18 mm (0.59–0.71 in) long. The calyx of the flowers is bell-shaped and truncated, while the corolla is a rounded ovate shape with basal auricles and often with a central patch of green.

Croppings of the indehiscent seed pods can occur by 4–6 years. The brown seed pods appear immediately after flowering, and mature in 10 to 11 months. The pods are thick-walled, smooth, somewhat flattened, and elliptical, but slightly curved with a short, curved point. The pods contain one or two brownish-red bean-like seeds, but because they do not split open naturally, the pods need to decompose before the seeds can germinate. The seeds are about 1.5–2.5 cm (0.59–0.98 in) long with a brittle, oily coat, and are unpalatable in natural form to herbivores.

Pongamia pinnata is an outbreeding diploid legume tree, with a diploid chromosome number of 22. Root nodules are of the determinate type (as those on soybean and common bean) formed by the causative bacterium Bradyrhizobium.

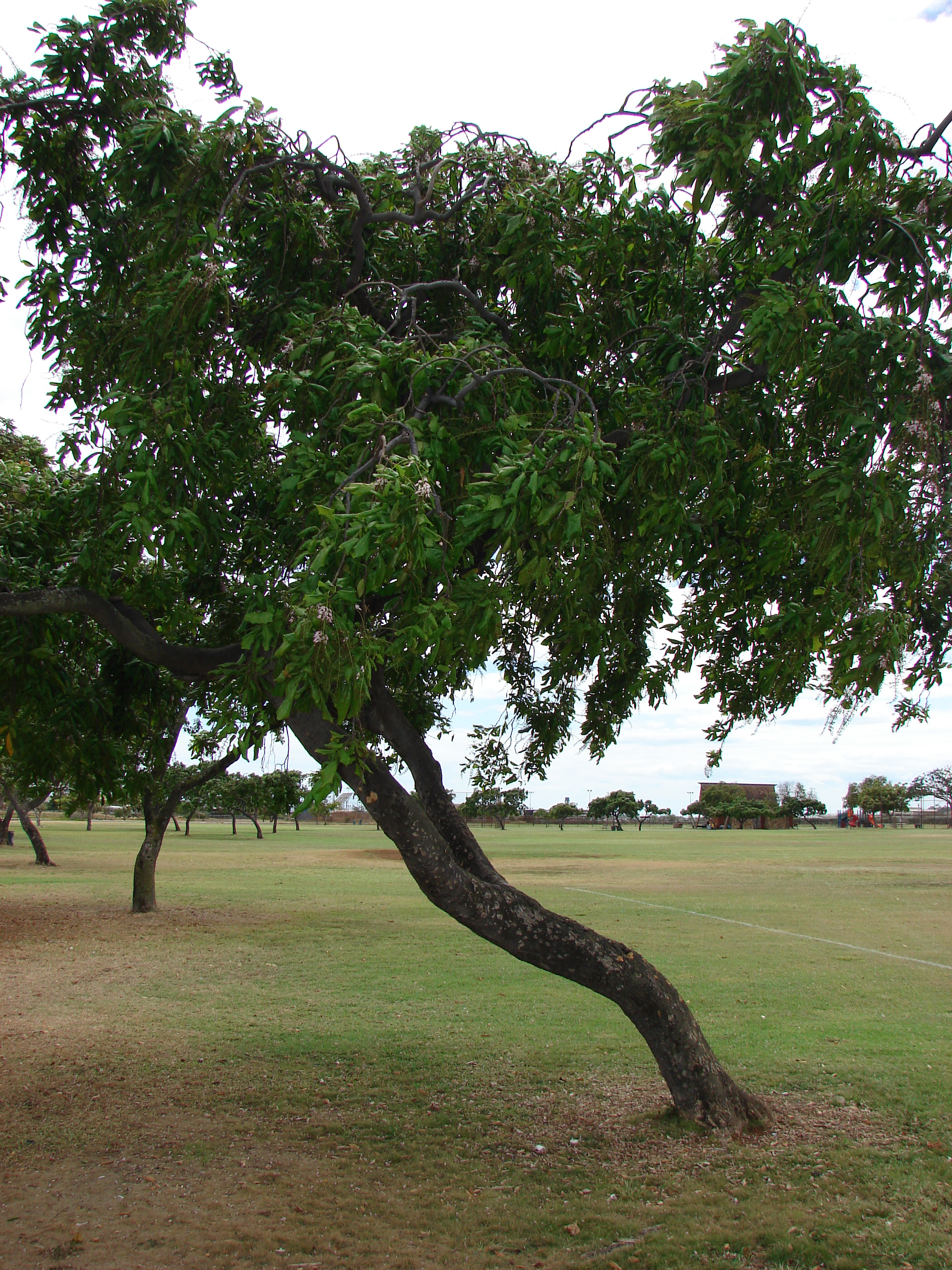
In Oahu, Hawaii

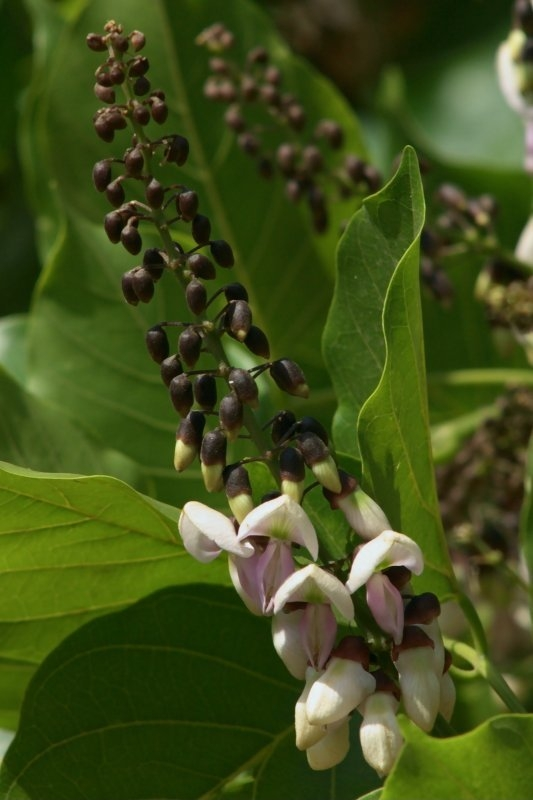
Inflorescence

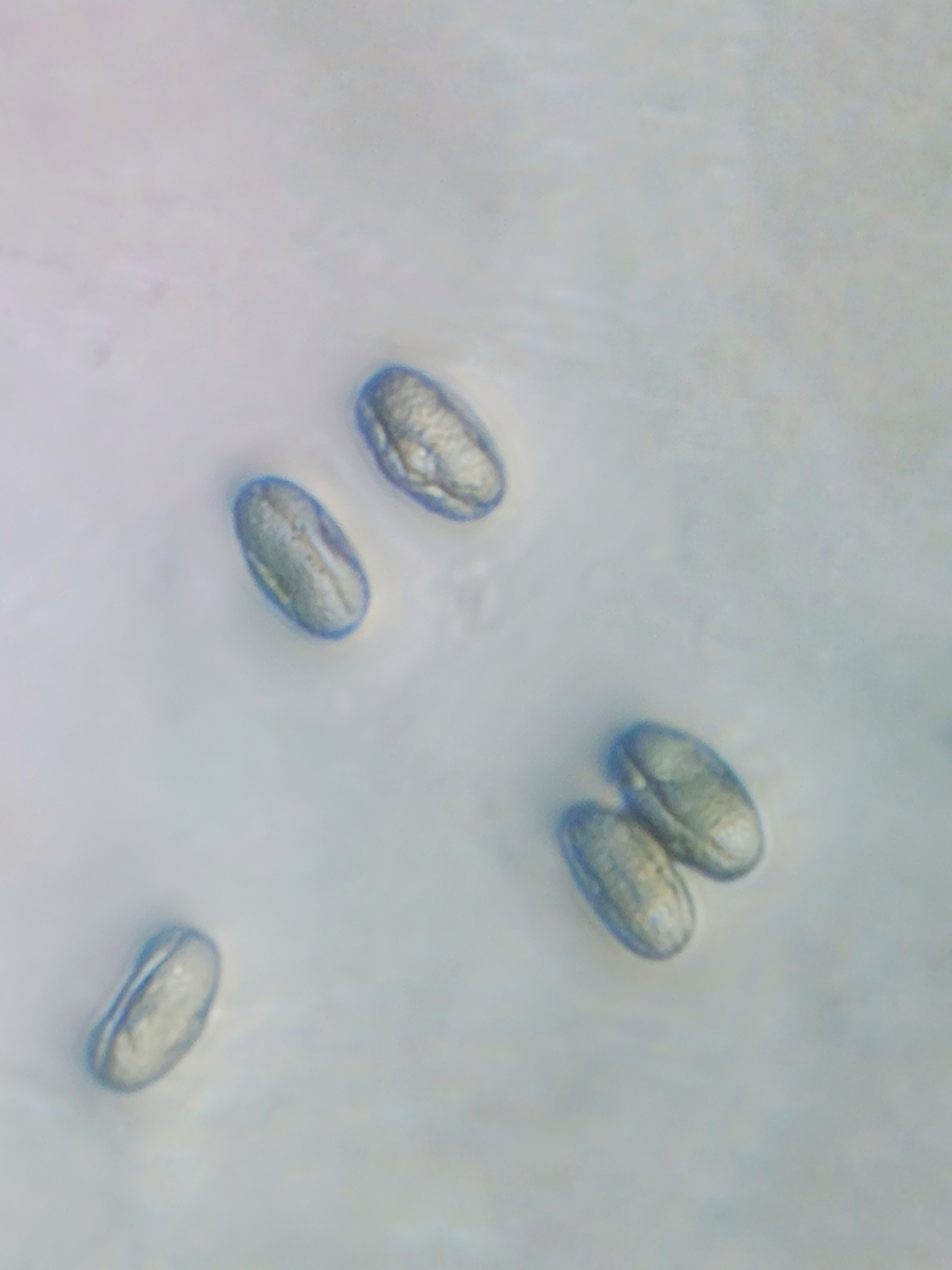
Pollen grains

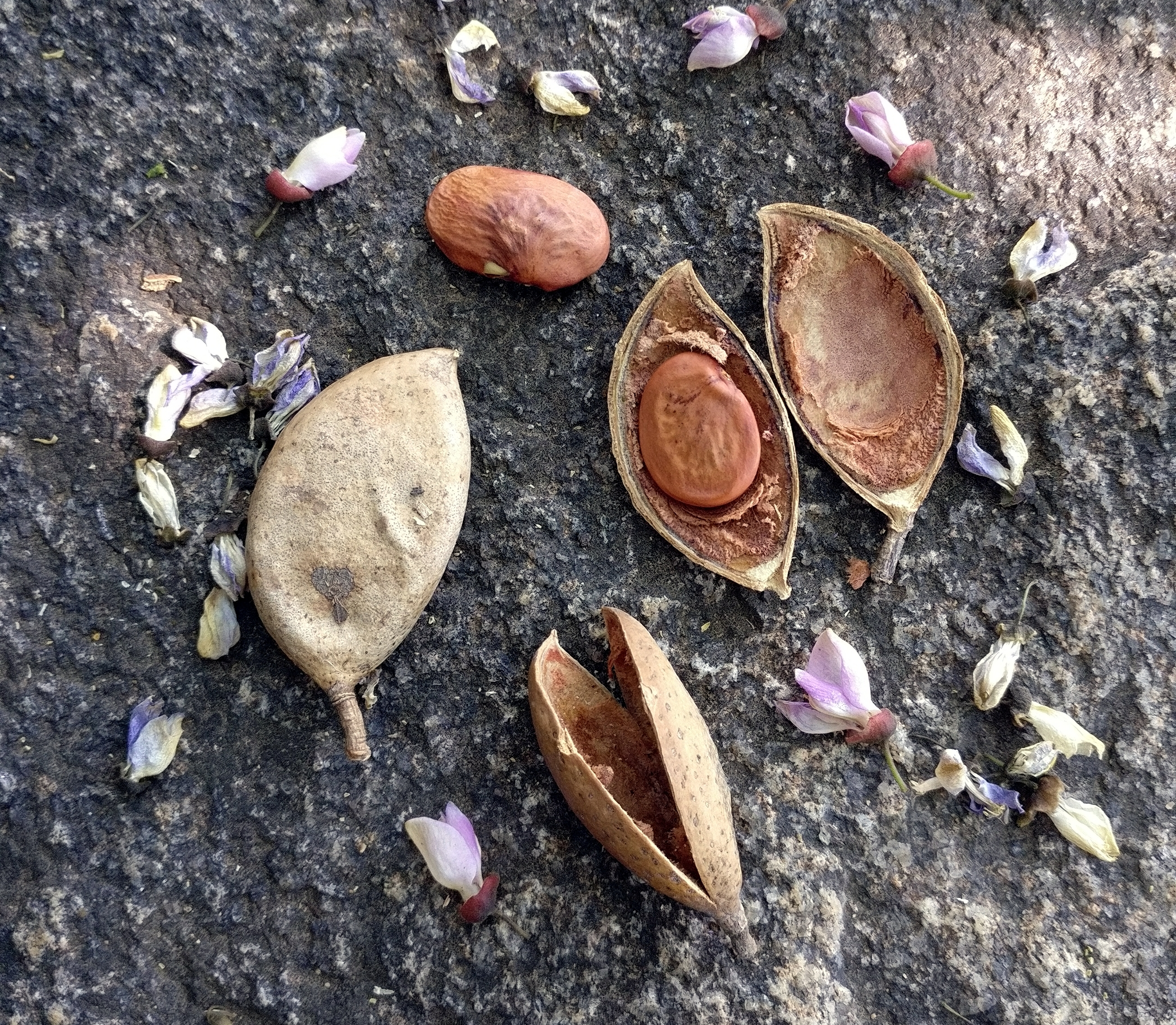
Fruits

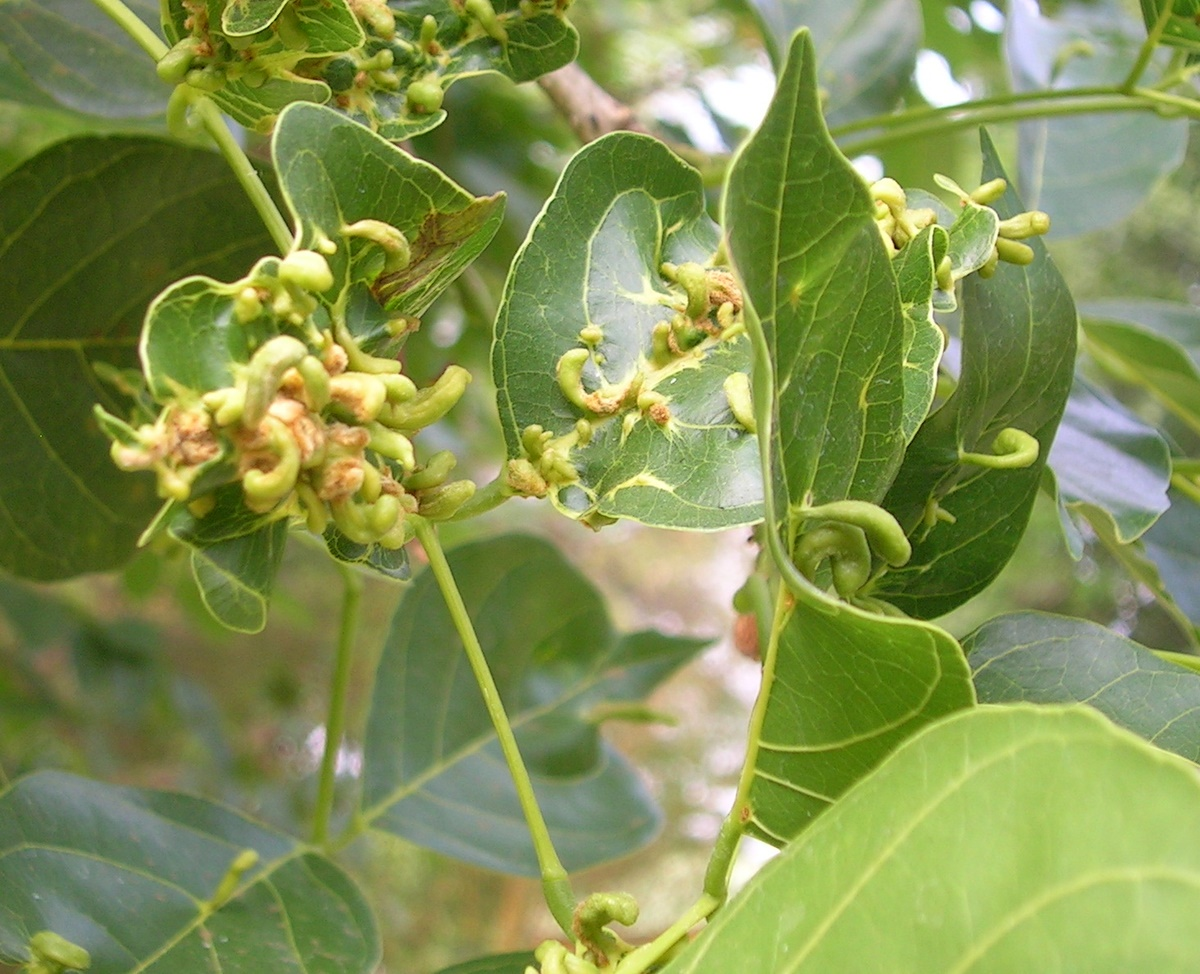
Leaves with galls

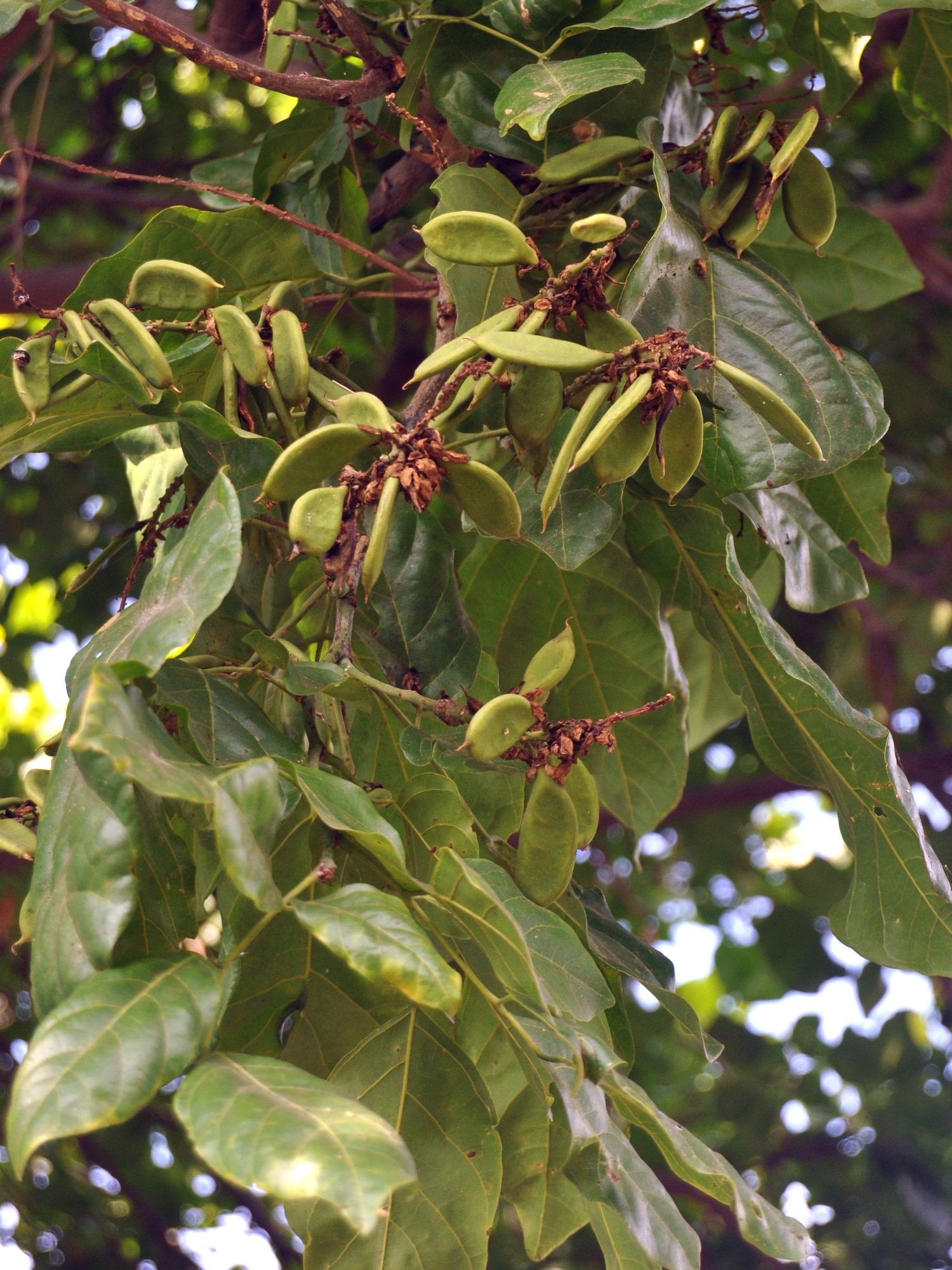
Pods, Gangga, North Lombok

== Taxonomy ==
The species was first described as Cytisus pinnatus by Carl Linnaeus in 1753. In 1898, Jean Baptiste Louis Pierre reclassified it as Pongamia pinnata. In 1984, Robert Geesink concluded that species of Pongamia and Millettia were easily confused, and consolidated the Pongamia species into Millettia. Subsequent studies revealed that Millettia pinnata was paraphyletic within Millettia, and the species was reclassified as Pongamia pinnata, the sole species in the revived genus Pongamia.

== Distribution and habitat ==
The species is naturally distributed in tropical and temperate Asia, from Pakistan to Japan to Thailand and Malesia, including Sri Lanka, as well as northern and northeastern Australia and some Pacific islands; It has been propagated and distributed further around the world in humid and subtropical environments from sea level to 1,360 m (Chingola, Zambia), although in the Himalayan foothills, it is not found above 600 m. Withstanding temperatures slightly below 0 °C (32 °F) and up to about 50 °C (122 °F) and annual rainfall of 500–2,500 mm (20–98 in), the tree grows wild on sandy and rocky soils, including oolitic limestone, and will grow in most soil types, even with its roots in salt water.

The tree is well suited to intense heat and sunlight, and its dense network of lateral roots and its thick, long taproot make it drought tolerant. The dense shade it provides slows the evaporation of surface water and its root nodules promote nitrogen fixation, a symbiotic process by which gaseous nitrogen (N_{2}) from the air is converted into ammonium (NH_{4}^{+}, a form of nitrogen available to the plant). M. pinnata is also a freshwater flooded forest species, as it can survive total submergence in water for few months continuously. M. pinnata trees are common in Tonlé Sap lake swamp forests in Cambodia.

P. pinnata is now broadly distributed across India, Asia, Africa, northern Australia, and the Pacific and Caribbean Islands and it has been cultivated and transported since the nineteenth century or earlier. As a result, some literature declares M. pinnata naturalised in Africa and certain parts of the United States, while its status as naturalised or native is uncertain in other regions.

== Uses ==
Pongamia pinnata is well-adapted to arid zones, and has many traditional uses. It is often used for landscaping as a windbreak or for shade due to the large canopy and showy, fragrant flowers. The flowers are used by gardeners as compost for plants. The bark may be used to make twine or rope, and it also yields a black gum that has historically been used to treat wounds caused by poisonous fish. The wood is said to be beautifully grained, but splits easily when sawn, thus relegating it to firewood, posts, and tool handles. The tree's deep taproot and drought tolerance makes this tree ideal for controlling soil erosion and binding sand dunes. Rumphius writes the Malaparius (from Moluccan malapari) bark can be used to neutralise eeltail catfish venom, Seram Timur and Banda peoples infuse it with garlic, massoy and clover to treat beri-beri.

Pongamia pinnata seeds generally contain oil (27–39%), protein (17–37%), starch (6–7%), crude fibre (5–7%), moisture (15–20%), and ash content (2–3%). Nearly half of the oil content of P. pinnata seeds is oleic acid. Oil made from the seeds, known as pongamia oil, has been used as lamp oil, in soapmaking, and as a lubricant. The oil has a high content of triglycerides. Its disagreeable taste and odour are due to bitter flavonoid constituents, including karanjin, pongamol, tannin, and karanjachromene. These compounds induce nausea and vomiting if ingested in its natural form. The fruits, sprouts and seeds are used in traditional medicine. Some studies have identified hiragonic acid in Pongamia pinnata seed oil.

It can be grown in rainwater harvesting ponds up to 6 m (20 ft) in water depth without losing its greenery and remaining useful for biodiesel production. Studies have shown seedlings with tolerance to salinity levels between 12 and 19 dS/m, with an ability to tolerate salinity stresses of 32.5 dS/m.

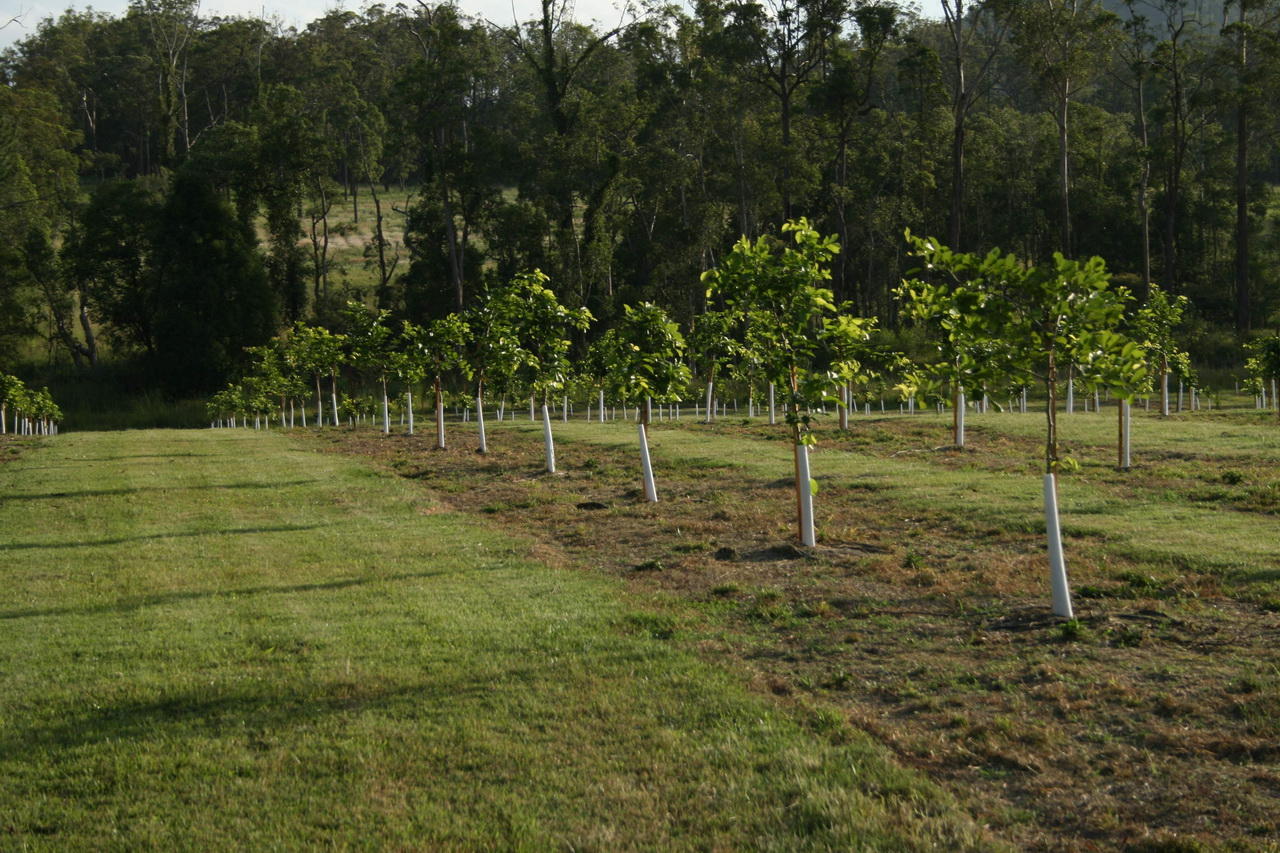
Pacific Renewable Energy trial plantation in Caboolture, Queensland

=== Renewable fuels and emerging applications ===
Research has investigated pongamia oil as a feedstock for sustainable aviation fuel. A 2021 study of pongamia seeds and oil from trees grown in Hawaii found that the oil had characteristics expected to make it suitable for hydroprocessed production of sustainable aviation fuel. The seed oil has been found to be useful in diesel generators, and along with Jatropha and castor, it was explored in hundreds of projects throughout India and the third world as feedstock for biodiesel. P. pinnata as a biofuel is commercially valuable to the rural populations of places such as India and Bangladesh, where the plant grows abundantly, because it can support the socioeconomic development of these areas.

Research indicates potential use of P. pinnata as a food source for cattle, sheep, and poultry, as its byproduct contains up to 30% protein. As adaptive uses are increasing, the tree is being planted in former citrus growing regions that have declined in Florida and California because of disease and climate change conditions.
