= Boquerones en vinagre =

Anchovy tapa appetizer

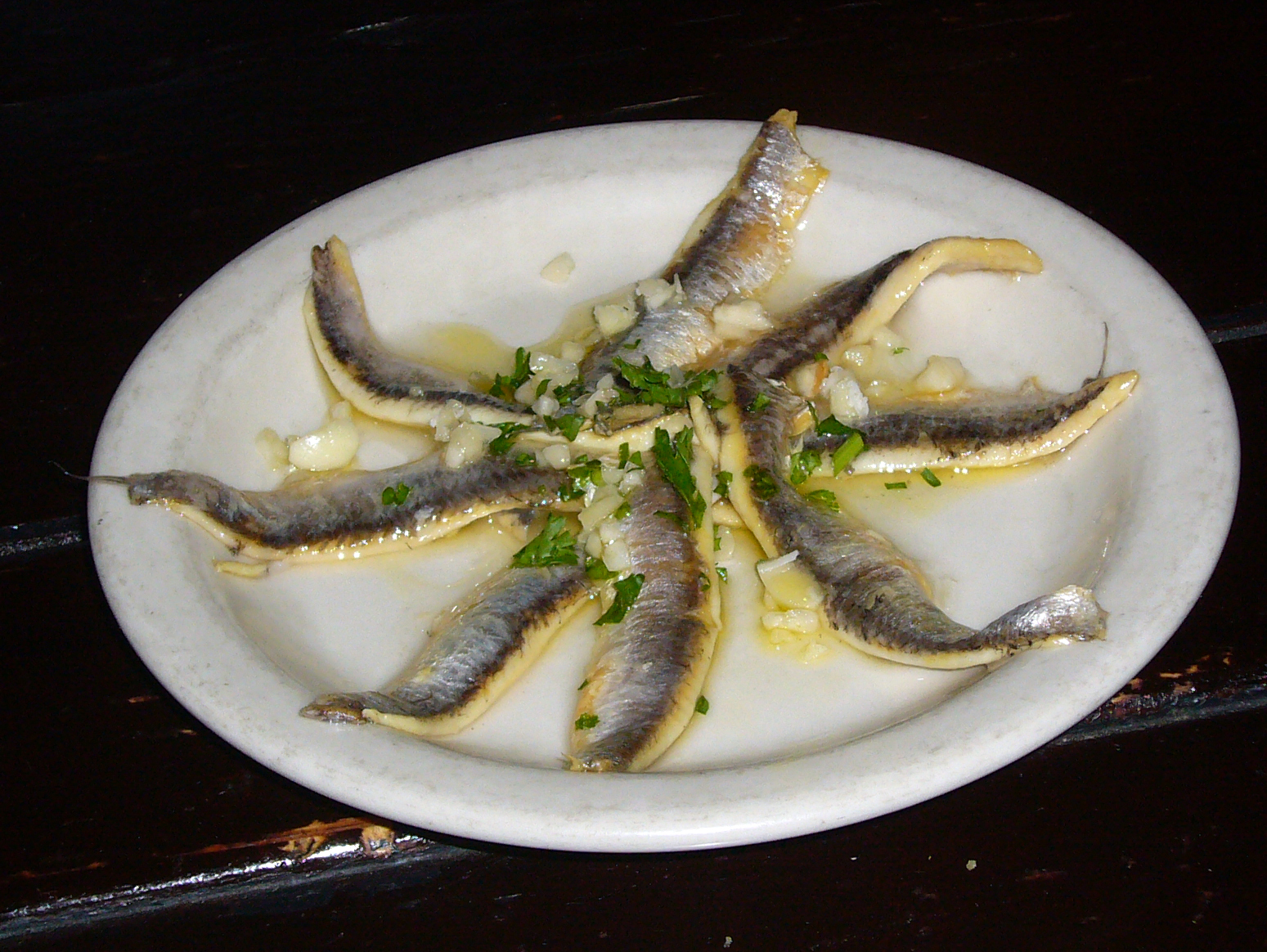
- Course: Hors d'oeuvre
- Place of origin: Spain
- Main ingredients: White anchovies, vinegar, garlic, parsley, sometimes olive oil

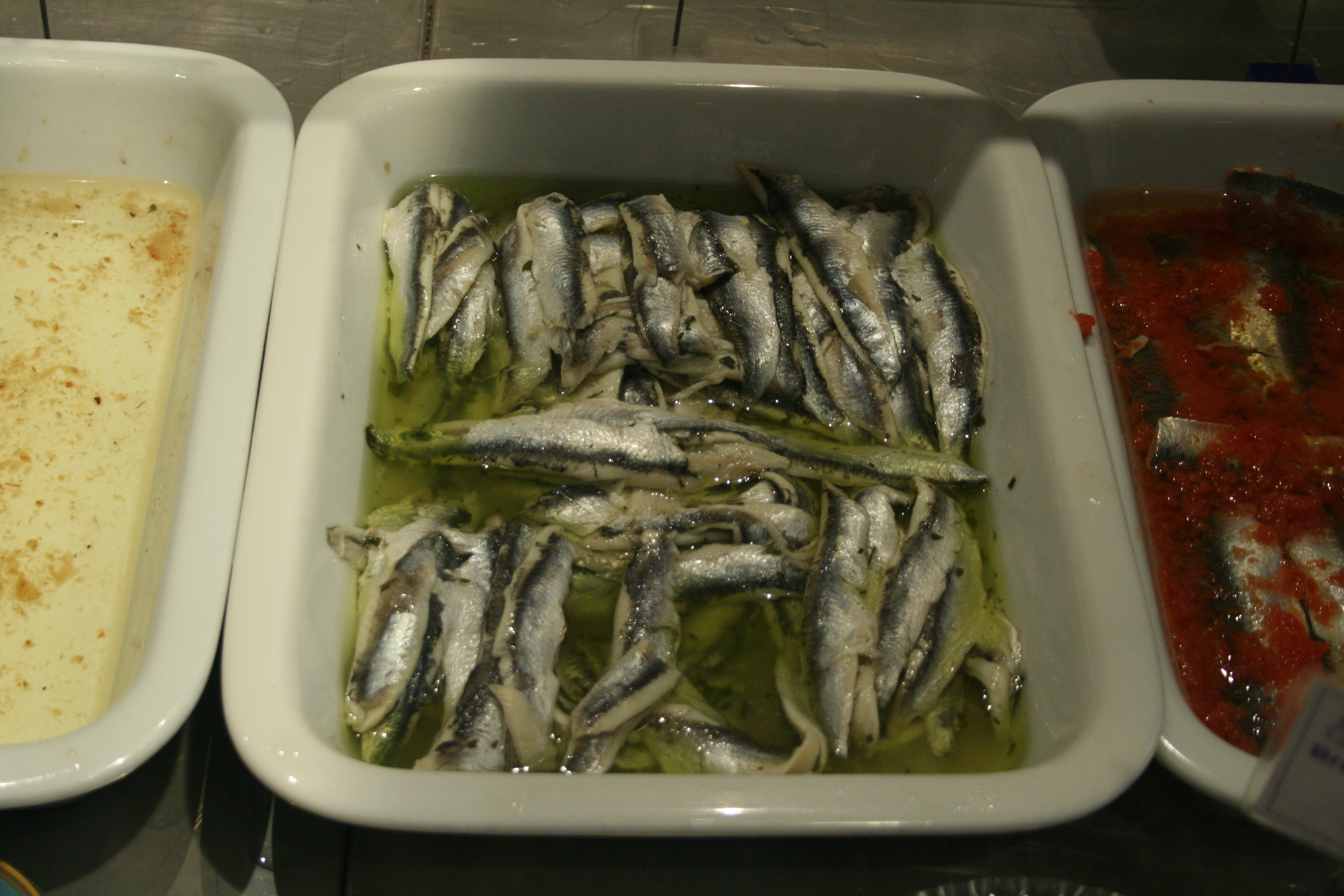
Boquerones en vinagre, ready for serving.

Boquerones en vinagre are a type of appetizer or tapa found in Spain. The central ingredient of the dish is the boquerones, fresh anchovies. The fillets are marinated in vinegar or a mixture of vinegar and olive oil, and seasoned with garlic and parsley. It is commonly served with beer, soft drinks, or wine.

== Characteristics and presentation ==
Fresh anchovy fillets, which initially have a brown-colored meat, are cleaned, de-scaled, and submerged in a bath of salt and water for 3 hours and vinegar for 6 hours in a cool place. The fillets slowly turn white as the vinegar reacts with the fish. Once having gone through this process and the liquid has been drained, they are seasoned with minced garlic, olive oil, and parsley. An alternative preparation is to submerge the fillets in a mixture of 3:1 of vinegar and olive oil (it can be replaced by sunflower oil), already seasoned with garlic, parsley, and salt, for two days. They are served cold with beer rather than wine since they already contain vinegar and sugar.

The dish is popular as a tapa in Spain and served in restaurants and bars, especially during the hottest summer months. They are garnished with capers or olives and accompanied by potato chips. The prepared fish can be bought commercially (cleaned, deboned, with vinegar), requiring only additional garlic and parsley.

== Health concerns ==
Anchovies can concentrate domoic acid, which causes amnesic shellfish poisoning in humans, sea mammals, and birds. If suspected, medical attention should be sought. Anchovies also contain a high level of uric acid, a build-up of which can cause the inflammatory condition known as gout.

Spanish health laws require the previous freezing of the anchovies when prepared in vinegar to avoid the survival of any Anisakis larvae, even though this parasite is rarely found off Spanish coasts.

== See also ==
- Ceviche
- Lakerda
- Tapas
