= Maria Holic =

Japanese manga series

- Maria†Holic
- Maria†Holic's first manga volume cover featuring Mariya Shidō

まりあ†ほりっく (Maria†Horikku)
- Genre: Romantic comedy
- Manga
- Written by: Minari Endō
- Published by: Media Factory
- English publisher: NA: Tokyopop (former) One Peace Books (current)
- Magazine: Monthly Comic Alive
- Original run: June 27, 2006 – November 27, 2014
- Volumes: 14
- Anime television series
- Directed by: Akiyuki Shinbo; Naoyuki Tatsuwa (Note: Assistant Director (副監督). See the Shaft director credits legend.); Yukihiro Miyamoto (Note: Series Director (シリーズディレクター).)
- Produced by: Nobuhiro Oosawa (Genco); Kazuya Takahashi (Frontier Works); Hiromasa Minami (AT-X); Toshiaki Asaka (Media Factory)
- Written by: Masahiro Yokotani
- Music by: Tatsuya Nishikawa
- Studio: Shaft
- Licensed by: NA: Sentai Filmworks (Note: Home video distribution rights through Section23 Films and streaming rights through HIDIVE)
- Original network: Chiba TV, AT-X, Sun TV, Tokyo MX, TV Kanagawa, TV Osaka
- Original run: January 5, 2009 – March 23, 2009
- Episodes: 12
- Anime television series

Maria†Holic: Alive
- Directed by: Akiyuki Shinbo (Note: Chief Director (総監督).); Kenichi Ishikura; Tomokazu Tokoro
- Produced by: Hiromasa Minami (AT-X); Ryūtarō Kawakami (Egg Firm); Osamu Hosokawa (Hakuhodo DY); Sachi Kawamoto (Media Factory); Takashi Hijikata (Kadokawa)
- Written by: Masahiro Yokotani
- Music by: Tatsuya Nishikawa
- Studio: Shaft (Note: Animation assistance (アニメーション協力) for all episodes provided by Studio Pastoral.)
- Licensed by: NA: Sentai Filmworks
- Original network: AT-X, TV Osaka, TV Tokyo
- Original run: April 8, 2011 – June 24, 2011
- Episodes: 12
- Manga

Sono Ato no 12-kagetsu no Ohanashi
- Written by: Minari Endō
- Published by: Media Factory
- Magazine: Monthly Comic Alive
- Original run: August 27, 2026 – present

Maria†Holic (Japanese: まりあ†ほりっく, Hepburn: Maria†Horikku) is a Japanese manga series written and illustrated by Minari Endō, the author of Dazzle. The manga was first serialized in the Japanese seinen manga magazine Monthly Comic Alive on June 27, 2006, and is published by Media Factory. The manga was initially licensed by Tokyopop in North America and picked up by One Peace Books in 2016 after Tokyopop lost the license in 2011. It has also been released digitally by BookWalker, Kadokawa's online digital shopfront. The series follows Kanako Miyamae who just got transferred to an all-girls private Catholic school to find a partner of the same sex.

The first anime adaptation animated by Shaft aired in Japan between January and March 2009. A second anime season, Maria†Holic: Alive, premiered on April 8, 2011. Both seasons of the anime series have been licensed by Sentai Filmworks.

== Plot ==
Maria†Holic revolves around a high school girl named Kanako Miyamae, who due to a childhood incident is scared of boys and breaks out in hives if a boy touches her. During her second year of high school, she enrolls in an all-girls school hoping to find a female romantic partner. However, her ideal candidate, Mariya Shidō, turns out to be a sadistic cross-dressing boy.

== Characters ==
Kanako Miyamae (宮前 かなこ, Miyamae Kanako)
Voiced by: Asami Sanada (Japanese); Jessica Calvello (English)
Kanako is the protagonist of the story. She is a second year high school transfer student to Ame no Kisaki, a Catholic-based all-girls academy. Kanako has an inherent fear of men which began in elementary school when a piece of her recorder and P.E. uniform were stolen. When coming into physical contact with any man, she instantaneously breaks out in hives. This has significantly contributed to her fear of boys. Kanako is almost solely interested in girls in regards to her ideal romantic relationships. She instantly and constantly suffers from nosebleeds—a visible indication of sexual perverseness frequently used in anime and manga. Her reason for transferring to Ame no Kisaki is to look for her one true love. Kanako begins her reflections on her situation with the phrase "Dear mother in heaven." Kanako is also quite tall (standing at 175 cm or 5'9"), making her height (and her weight) emotional weak spots. She also takes constant verbal abuse from Mariya and his maid, Matsurika. She is often called a 'pervert', or 'lesbian', or other nicknames they happen to give her.
Mariya Shidō (祇堂 鞠也, Shidō Mariya)
Voiced by: Yū Kobayashi (Japanese); Monica Rial (English)
Mariya is the title character of the story. He is a cross-dressing boy who attends Ame no Kisaki as a girl as a means to win the chairmanship of both the all-male and all-female schools where his late grandmother served as the ex-chairman for both. He deeply respects and loves his grandmother and does not care about actually winning chairmanship. He simply wishes to honor his grandmother's request. He appears to genuinely care about others though this facade is often hidden through some excuse he has crafted for himself. When Kanako first meets Mariya, she is instantly attracted to his playful femininity and kindness. He often teases Kanako by playing with his long blonde hair, speaking in a soft voice, and smiling sweetly. However, Mariya turns out to be quite sadistic in nature and generally adjusts his personality to reflect whatever situation he is in. Mariya's beauty and feminine gestures are so convincing that the entire school, including the faculty, have no idea of his true gender. Mariya is quite short, reaching at most up to the height at the tip of Kanako's nose (160 cm or 5'3"), and shorter than Matsurika. Because of the switching with his sister his original name was Shizu instead.
Matsurika Shinōji (汐王寺 茉莉花, Shinōji Matsurika)
Voiced by: Marina Inoue (Japanese); Caitlynn French (English)
Matsurika is Mariya's maid. She is generally silent but is usually quite rude when she chooses to speak. She delivers the vast majority of her lines with almost no facial expressions. The majority of her insults are directed at Kanako and Mariya. She refers to Kanako by such names as "Ms. Pig," "Eiffel Tower" and "Tokyo Tower" due to Kanako's tall stature. When speaking to Mariya, Matsurika often delivers sharp remarks in regards to his cross-dressing tendencies or sexual perversions. Matsurika also attends classes with Mariya. She also stays hidden from the rest of the students, and follows Mariya's orders when told.
Nanami Kiri (桐 奈々美, Kiri Nanami)
Voiced by: Akemi Kanda (Japanese); Carli Mosier (English)
Nanami is an aloof and bespectacled student at Ame no Kisaki. Although she appears quite cold and dispassionate on the surface, she is actually a very caring and helpful personality. At the bequest of the teacher, she helps Kanako to overcome her initial troubles at the school, to the extent that she is willing to put her own reputation at stake by pretending to be Kanako's lover; so as to avoid trouble from Ryūken's fans. She eventually becomes very close friends with Sachi.
Sachi Momoi (桃井 サチ, Momoi Sachi)
Voiced by: Ryōko Shintani (Japanese); Margaret McDonald (English)
Sachi is a bright and cheerful girl, quickly becoming friends with the newcomer, Kanako. She has orange hair, commonly tied in pigtails. She is good friends with Yuzuru. She seems to have access to hammer space, as she pulls numerous things out from her pockets, even things that would not fit.
Yuzuru Inamori (稲森 弓弦, Inamori Yuzuru)
Voiced by: Saori Gotō (Japanese); Shannon Emerick (English)
Yuzuru is a demure and friendly girl who has long been friends with Sachi. She is fairly shy and has some self-esteem issues. Kanako sees Inamori as a more elegant girl and is intrigued by her surprisingly large breasts. She is the best archer in the school's archery club, of which Mariya is also a member.
Ryūken Ishima (石馬 隆顕, Ishima Ryūken)
Voiced by: Yuko Kaida (Japanese); Beth Lazarou (English)
Ryūken is the star of Ame no Kisaki, due to her tall stature, good looks, kindness, and generally tomboyish nature. She is a member of the Drama Club, and has played several male roles. She has a great number of fans and her own fan club. Mariya himself is actually quite jealous of her popularity. She was supposed to be Kanako's roommate at the dormitories only to be run out the first night by Mariya so that Mariya could keep a close eye on Kanako. Ryūken's fans cause mischief for Kanako because they are jealous of her friendship with Ryūken.
Dorm Leader (寮長先生, Ryōchō-sensei)
Voiced by: Miyuki Sawashiro (Japanese); Brittney Karbowski (English)
The Dorm Leader is an unusual young girl with cat ears who looks after Dorm No. 2 which Kanako is assigned to. She is addressed as "Miss Dorm Leader" by all the students. When Kanako met her, and tried to make small talk and ask casual questions the Dorm Leader looped back to the first question to say that she might also be addressed as 'Boss' or 'God'. Kanako took this as a hint to ask no more questions. The students do not dare disobey her for fear of vague, yet frightening threats. She has a pet dog, Yonakuni, who helps her take care of the place. Her rule of the dorm extends to manhandling Father Kanae after repeatedly demanding bribes so that he can see Kanako. She has an idiosyncratic speech pattern which makes her speak in a rather languid fashion and insert wherever grammatically possible the phrase 'desu yo'. Whenever seen in the anime alone with Yonakuni, the Dorm Leader can be seen regularly singing disturbing songs about the act of devouring meat, or other strange subjects.
Ayari Shiki (志木 絢璃, Shiki Ayari)
Voiced by: Miyu Matsuki (Japanese); Nancy Novotny (English)
Ayari runs the school's student council. She is Mariya's and Shizu's cousin, and has a standing rivalry with Mariya. She calls him 'Flat Chest', as he calls her 'Fat Ass'. Apparently, the cause of the animosity between Mariya and Ayari happened because of a childhood incident where she had her dress ripped open supposedly by Mariya (and her underwear exposed). Because of that incident, she got called "Panda-Chang" after the mascot character printed on her underwear and all sorts of nicknames related to pandas. She blames Mariya for this incident and therefore holds a grudge on him for that. Ayari and Mariya look much alike and are about the same height.
Maki Natsuru (菜鶴 真紀, Natsuru Maki)
Voiced by: Erino Hazuki (Japanese); Tiffany Terrell (English)
Maki is the vice president of Ame no Hisaki's student council. Father Kanae happens to have a crush on her.

Shizu Shidō (祇堂 静珠, Shidō Shizu)
Voiced by: Aya Hirano (Japanese); Monica Rial (English)
Shizu is Mariya's twin sister. She attends an all-boys school which was also run by the ex-chairman. She has a similar hatred/fear of males, and had similar experiences as Kanako, who she affectionately calls 'Kana-chan'. Unlike Mariya, she appears to actually be the kind, innocent girl that Mariya attempts to portray. She is also quick to get her feelings hurt, as well. The agreement for the competition was the loser would be chosen if someone found out from either school; Kanako, thinking Shizu was Mariya, mentioned Mariya's touching her, which revealed to Shizu that Kanako knew Mariya's gender, thus defining Mariya as the loser. Shizu had only gone into the school to switch with Mariya for their schools' physical examinations. However, because Kanako found out Mariya's secret before she began attending the school, it was null, and because Kanako knew Shizu's true gender, ordinarily, Mariya would've been claimed victor. But out of generosity, Mariya chose to overlook it in favor of his twin sister. The only way to distinguish between Shizu and Mariya is by the mole under their eyes; Mariya's is under his left eye, while Shizu's is under her right eye. Because of the switching with her brother her original name was Mariya instead. She is 160.3 cm (equal to 5'3") tall, which makes her marginally taller than Mariya, and happens to be a sore point for him. The two siblings regularly compete, not just in height and weight, but in studies as well.
Tōichirō Kanae (鼎 藤一郎, Kanae Tōichirō)
Voiced by: Tomokazu Sugita (Japanese); Illich Guardiola (English)
Kanae is the priest of the school Ame no Kisaki. He is the teacher for Modern Japanese and is very popular among the students because of his good looks. He gets a crush on every beautiful girl he sees and is currently "in love" with Mariya, Matsurika, Maki, and Ayari. He seems to be concerned about Kanako because of her strange behavior in his eyes. She is also the only one who failed in the Modern Japanese exams. Because of Mariya making up a story about how Kanako's elder brother died and that he resembles her brother, he desperately wants to help her. He is similar to Kanako because he begins his sentences sometimes with "Skipped, Dear mama in heaven..." and is also prone to having long internal monologues (and generally looking too deeply into the most trivial of matters) and occasionally, fantasies. He also thinks much about what a person could mean when they are saying something. The similarity between Kanako and him is also that they both like beautiful girls. He is half-French.
Honoka Tsutsui (筒井穂佳, Tsutsui Honoka)
Voiced by: Hatsumi Takada (Japanese); Allison Sumrall (English)
Honoka is a fan of Ryūken Ishima. She is a second-year high school student at Ame no Kisaki. She hates Kanako because she was Ryūken's roommate. Honoka and her friends (who are Ryūken's fans too) had terrorized roommates of Ryūken earlier, which is why nobody wanted to live with her. Honoka has envied Kanako and terrorized her too, such as placing seafood in Kanako's desk or in her pencil case.
Fumi Kumagai (熊谷 芙美, Kumagai Fumi)
Voiced by: Megumi Toyoguchi (Japanese); Molly Searcy (English)
Kumagai is the homeroom teacher for Kanako, Nanami, Sachi and Yuzuru. She is a graduate of Ame no Kisaki and remembers Kanako's mother Professor Miyamae. She had met Kanako herself when she was very young. She tells Kanako that everyone calls her "Miss Teddybear".
Rindō Shinōji (汐王寺 竜胆, Shinōji Rindo)
Voiced by: Nobuhiko Okamoto (Japanese); Clint Bickham (English)
Rindō is Matsurika Shinōji's twin brother. However, Rindō and Matsurika have almost no similarities in looks and/or personalities. One of the only things similar is their eye color and how cruel they can be. Rindō is Shizu Shidō's butler and is in a similar situation as Matsurika is in. He is one of the few people in the series who know of Shizu and Mariya Shidō's true genders and identities. He loves to set up traps around the Shidō residence, trying to ensnare Mariya since they were children.

== Media ==
=== Manga ===
Maria†Holic is written and illustrated by Minari Endō. It started serialization in Media Factory's seinen manga magazine Monthly Comic Alive on June 27, 2006. The manga concluded on November 27, 2014. Media Factory collected its chapters in 14 tankōbon volumes, released from February 23, 2007, to February 23, 2015. The manga was licensed by Tokyopop, and the first volume was available in September 2009. However, they only managed to publish the first six volumes before they lost the license. Kadokawa has released the entire series digitally in English via their website BookWalker. In 2016, One Peace Books started releasing a 3-in-1 omnibus version as well as individual volumes from volume seven onwards in English.

A sequel, titled Maria†Holic: Sono Ato no 12-kagetsu no Ohanashi, began serialization in Monthly Comic Alive on August 27, 2026.

No.	Original release date	Original ISBN	English release date	English ISBN
1	February 23, 2007	978-4-8401-1676-3	September 1, 2009	978-1-4278-1671-9
01: "Girl Meets Boy(?) Story"; 02: "First Time Changing Clothes Story"; 03: "Transfer Day Experiences Story" 1; 04: "Transfer Day Experiences Story" 2; 05: "In Which The Bullied Child Turns Out Respectable After All"; 06: "The Story of the Protection Syndrome"; 07: "The Story of Befriending 100 People"
2	November 22, 2007	978-4-8401-1974-0	November 23, 2009	978-1-4278-1672-6
08: "About Your Tragic Past"; 09: "About The Physical Examination Hemoglobin"; 10: "About the Gimmick Where you tell them apart by the Position of the Mole"; 11: "About how a Maiden's Friendship is Beyond one's Control"; 12: "About the Blood-Stained Virgin Mary Festival" 1; 13: "About the Blood-Stained Virgin Mary Festival" 2; Spin-Out: "The Tale of the Tear-Stained Democracy"
3	July 23, 2008	978-4-8401-2246-7	March 2, 2010	978-1-4278-1673-3
14: "The Tale of the Bloody Virgin Mary Festival"; 15: "The Tale of Glasses, Failing Grades and a Seasonal Change of Clothing"; 16: "The Tale of a Home Visit in B Minor" 1; 17: "The Tale of a Home Visit in B Minor" 2; 18: "The Tale of a summer Love Revolution"; Spin-Out: "The Tale of How Public Safety is a Gloomy James Bond"
4	December 22, 2008	978-4-8401-2503-1	June 29, 2010	978-1-4278-1782-2
19: "The Tale of Three Kingdoms and God's Holiday"; 20: "The Tale of Shizu is Mariya and Mariya is Shizu and..."; 21: "The Tale of Mariya is Shizu and Shizu is Maria and..."; 22: "The Tale of the Sunday Hunt to Entertain Our Guest"; 23: "The Tale of Cute but Embarrassing Treats"; 24: "The Tale of Pigging Out or Slimming Up for the Metabolic Summer"; Spin-Out: "Go! Go! Touichirou-kun!!"
5	October 23, 2009	978-4-8401-2595-6; 978-4-8401-2594-9 (LE)	November 9, 2010	978-1-4278-1829-4
25: "The Tale of the First Yonakuni Trial" 1 (第一回与那国公判①, Daiikkai Yonakuni Kōhan 1); 26: "The Tale of the First Yonakuni Trial" 2 (第一回与那国公判②, Daiikkai Yonakuni Kōhan 2); 27: "The Tale of Please Anticipate the Next Issue's Kanako" (次号のかなこさんにご期待くださいのおはなし, Jigō no Kanako-san ni Gokitai Kudasai no Ohanashi); 28: "The Tale of Kanako's Welcome Home" 1 (おかえりなさいかなこさんのおはなし①, Okaerinasai Kanako-san no Ohanashi 1); 29: "The Tale of Kanako's Welcome Home" 2 (おかえりなさいかなこさんのおはなし②, Okaerinasai Kanako-san no Ohanashi 2); 30: "The Tale of the Week Without Kanako" 1 (かなこさんの居ない一週間のおはなし①, Kanako-san no Inai Isshūkan no Ohanashi 1); 31: "The Tale of the Week Without Kanako" 2 (かなこさんの居ない一週間のおはなし②, Kanako-san no Inai Isshūkan no Ohanashi 2)
6	February 23, 2010	978-4-8401-2988-6	February 3, 2011	978-1-4278-3176-7
"Matsurika†Holic" (まつりか†ほりっく, Matsurika Horikku); 32: "The Tale of "Sachi Birthday to you"" (サッチ・バースディ・トゥ・ユーのおはなし, Sacchi Baasudi tu Yuu no Ohanashi); 33: "The Tale of Tear-Stained Photo Album" 1 (家族写真は涙色のおはなし①, Kazoku Shashin wa Namida Iro no Ohanashi); "Special Chapter: Whirlwind! The Tale of Girls' Dorm Number One" (特別収録風雲！第一女子寮のおはなし, Tokubetsu Shuroku Fuuun! Daiichi Joshi Ryou no Ohanashi); Spin Out: The Tale of Shameless Advertisement (4.5巻の宣伝ですよのおはなし, 4.5 Kan no Senden Desu yo no Ohanashi)
7	October 23, 2010	978-4-8401-3388-3	September 16, 2016	978-1-9449-3701-0
8	March 23, 2011	978-4-8401-3775-1	January 17, 2017	978-1-9449-3711-9
9	February 23, 2012	978-4-8401-4414-8	March 14, 2017	978-1-9449-3712-6
10	November 22, 2012	978-4-8401-4752-1	July 25, 2017	978-1-9449-3723-2
11	February 23, 2013	978-4-8401-4797-2; 978-4-8401-2594-9 (SE)	September 26, 2017	978-1-9449-3724-9
12	September 21, 2013	978-4-8401-5332-4	November 21, 2017	978-1-9449-3731-7
13	January 23, 2014	978-4-0406-6248-0	January 16, 2018	978-1-9449-3742-3
14	February 23, 2015	978-4-0406-7236-6; 978-4-04-067236-6 (SE)	February 13, 2018	978-1-9449-3743-0

=== Drama CDs ===
A drama CD was released on July 25, 2008, and was produced by Frontier Works. A drama CD was also bundled with the limited edition of volume five of the manga.

=== Anime ===
An anime adaptation directed by Akiyuki Shinbo and Yukihiro Miyamoto and produced by Shaft aired in Japan between January 5 and March 23, 2009, on Chiba TV, containing twelve episodes. The first episode of the anime was aired as a special broadcast on Animate TV from December 26, 2008, to January 4, 2009, and on AT-X on December 30, 2008. The anime series has been licensed by Sentai Filmworks and is being distributed by Section23 Films. The complete collection was released on DVD, February 23, 2010. Sentai Filmworks re-released the first season on DVD and Blu-ray with an English dub (produced at Seraphim Digital) on January 28, 2014. The opening theme is "Hanaji" by Yū Kobayashi, and the ending theme is a cover version of Yellow Magic Orchestra's 1983 single "Kimi ni, Mune Kyun" (君に、胸キュン) performed by Asami Sanada, Marina Inoue, and Yū Kobayashi, the voice actresses of the main characters.

A second anime season titled Maria†Holic: Alive, under the direction of Akiyuki Shinbo and Tomokazu Tokoro, began airing on April 8, 2011. The first BD/DVD volume for Maria†Holic: Alive, which contains unaired bonus footage, was released on July 27, 2011. Sentai Filmworks has licensed the second season and simulcasted the series on the Anime Network video website. The anime opening themes for Maria†Holic: Alive are "Mōsō Senshi Miyamae Kanako" (妄想戦士 宮前かなこ) by Tomokazu Sugita (episodes 1 through 4) and "Runrunriru Ranranrara" (るんるんりる らんらんらら) by Yū Kobayashi, and the ending theme is a cover version of Linda Yamamoto's song "Dōnimo Tomaranai" (どうにもとまらない) by Ame no Kisaki Gasshōdan. There is also a special ending song for episode 12, sung by Yū Kobayashi, titled "Don't Mind, Don't Mind!" (ドンマイ ドンマイ!, Donmai Donmai!) and was released on the same single as the other theme songs of the anime.

== Reception ==
Theron Martin of Anime News Network called the anime "more a pure comedy than a romantic comedy," including a "love-obsessed lesbian" and young man who has to "pass for a female in an all-girl's[sic] school." Martin said that it adds in new twists on "stock characters in lesbian girl's[sic] school series." While he said that some of the series is funny, at other times it is "outright weird," even as has developed artistry, a strong musical score. He concluded that the series does not have "a meaningful plot" and is more of a "stand-alone sketch comedy than anything."
