= Lakerda =

Ottoman pickled bonito dish

- Type: Mezze
- Region or state: Balkans and Middle East
- Main ingredients: Pickled bonito
- Similar dishes: Ceviche

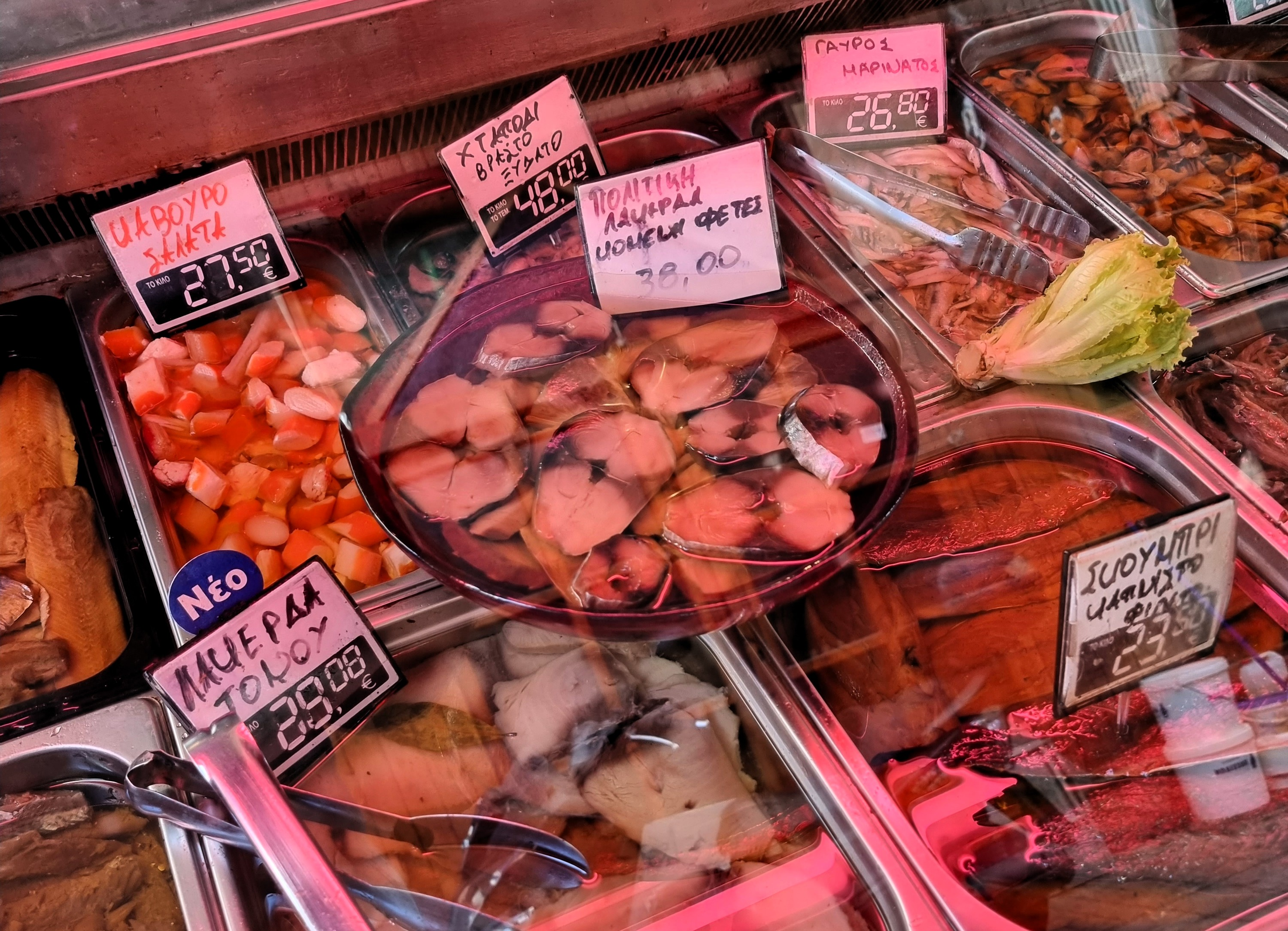
Lakerda steaks (center) at a store in Kapani (Agora Vlalì) Market, Thessaloniki

Lakerda (Greek: λακέρδα) is a pickled bonito dish eaten as a mezze in the Balkans and the Middle East. Lakerda made from one-year-old bonito migrating through the Bosphorus is especially prized.

== Name and history ==
Lakerda (λακέρδα) comes from Byzantine Greek lakerta (λακέρτα) 'mackerel', which in turn comes from Latin lacerta 'mackerel' or 'horse mackerel'. The Turkish word lakerda, attested from 1488, is a loan from the Greek.

== History ==
Lakerda is very similar to a prized ancient Greek dish, tarikhos horaion 'ripe salted fish' or simply horaion. Other ancient salt bonito preparations were called omotarikhos and kybion.

Lakerda was also a dish in Byzantine cuisine, being widely served in tavernes.

== Preparation ==
Steaks of bonito are boned, soaked in brine, then salted and weighted for about a week. They are then ready to eat, or may be stored in olive oil. Sometimes large mackerel or small tuna are used instead of bonito.

== Serving ==
In Greece, lakerda is usually served as a mezze, with sliced onion. Lemon juice and olive oil are common but criticized accompaniments. In Turkey, it is usually served as mezze, with sliced red onion, olive oil and black pepper. It is generally accompanied by rakı.

== See also ==
- Ceviche
- Boquerones en vinagre
