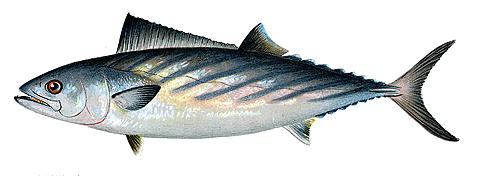
- Atlantic bonito, Sarda sarda

Scientific classification
- Kingdom: Animalia
- Phylum: Chordata
- Class: Actinopterygii
- Order: Scombriformes
- Family: Scombridae
- Tribe: Sardini
- Genus: Sarda; Cuvier, 1829

Species
- S. australis – Australian bonito; S. chiliensis – Eastern Pacific bonito; S. orientalis – Striped bonito; S. sarda – Atlantic bonito

= Sarda (fish) =

Genus of ray-finned fishes

Sarda is a genus of medium-sized, predatory ray-finned fish in the family Scombridae, and belonging to the tribe Sardini, more commonly called the bonito tribe. There are four species which comprise the genus Sarda. One of those species, the Pacific bonito, is further divided into two subspecies.

== Species ==
The following species are included in the genus Sarda:

- Sarda australis Macleay, 1881 (Australian bonito)
- Sarda chiliensis (Cuvier, 1832) (Eastern Pacific bonito)
  - Sarda chiliensis lineolata (Girard, 1858) (Pacific bonito)
- Sarda orientalis (Temminck & Schlegel, 1844) (Striped bonito)
- Sarda sarda (Bloch, 1793) (Atlantic bonito)
