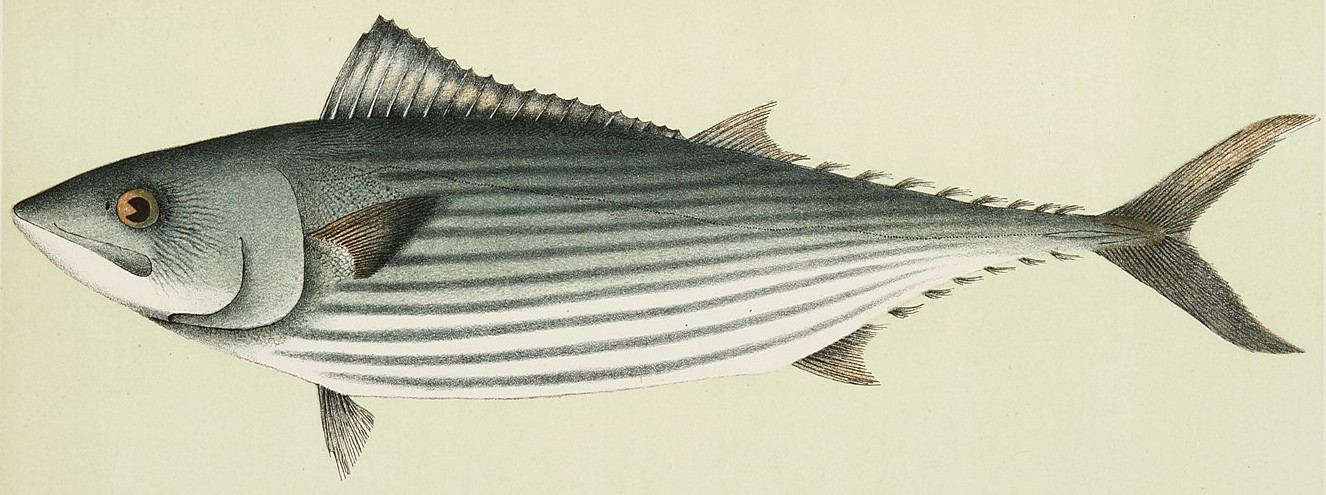

Conservation status
- Least Concern (IUCN 3.1)

Scientific classification
- Kingdom: Animalia
- Phylum: Chordata
- Class: Actinopterygii
- Order: Scombriformes
- Family: Scombridae
- Genus: Sarda
- Species: S. australis

Binomial name
- Sarda australis (Macleay, 1881)

Synonyms
- Pelamys australis Macleay, 1881; Pelamys schlegeli McCoy, 1888

= Australian bonito =

Species of ray-finned fish

The Australian bonito, horse mackerel, or little bonito, Sarda australis is a ray-finned fish of the family Scombridae. It is found in southeastern Australia and New Zealand. They swim in open water reaching depths of approximately 30 m (98 ft), though they can also dive deeper. Its length is commonly at around 40–45 cm (16–18 in) fork length and 1.8–2.3 kg (4.0–5.1 lb) weight. Its maximum length and weight are about 180 cm (71 in) and 9.4 kg (21 lb), respectively.

== Fishery ==
The Australian bonito is a minor commercial species and an important target for recreational fishers.
