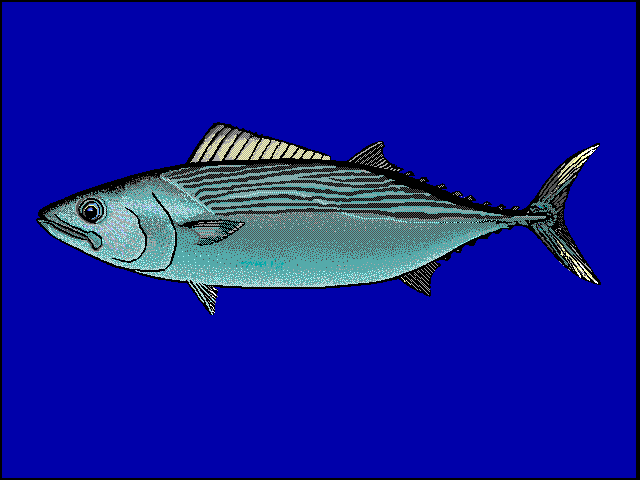

Conservation status
- Least Concern (IUCN 3.1)

Scientific classification
- Kingdom: Animalia
- Phylum: Chordata
- Class: Actinopterygii
- Division: Teleostei
- Order: Scombriformes
- Family: Scombridae
- Genus: Sarda
- Species: S. orientalis

Binomial name
- Sarda orientalis (Temminck & Schlegel, 1844)

Synonyms
- Pelamys orientalis Temminck & Schlegel, 1844; Sarda velox Meek & Hildebrand, 1923

= Striped bonito =

Species of ray-finned fish

The striped bonito (Sarda orientalis) is a species of marine ray-finned fish in the family Scombridae. They have been recorded at lengths of 102 centimetres (40 in), though they are commonly no longer than 55 centimetres (22 in). Distributed through the Indo-Pacific and East Pacific, the striped bonito is known to occur at depths from 1 to 167 metres (3 ft 3 in to 547 ft 11 in). They are called mackerel bonito.
