= Monterey Formation =

Miocene geological sedimentary formation in California

- Stratigraphic range: Early to Late Miocene, 18–6 Ma
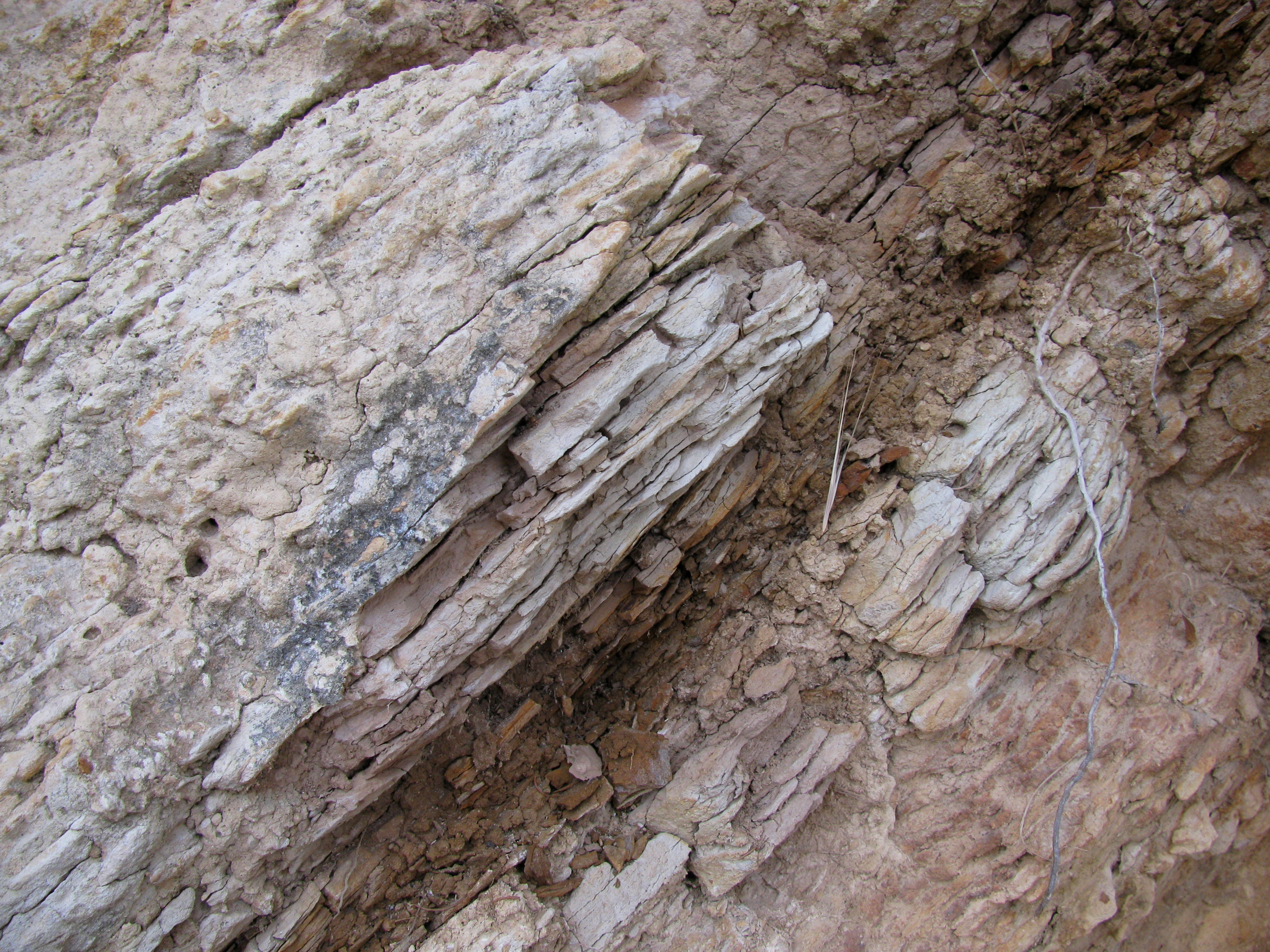
- Outcrop of Monterey Formation, Gaviota State Park, California
- Type: sedimentary
- Unit of: Los Angeles Basin
- Underlies: Sisquoc Formation, Capistrano Formation
- Overlies: Rincon Formation

Lithology
- Primary: Shale, sandstone
- Other: Diatomite, oil shale

Location
- Coordinates: 33.6°N 117.7°W
- Approximate paleocoordinates: 33.1°N 114.9°W
- Region: California
- Country: United States

Type section
- Named for: Monterey, California

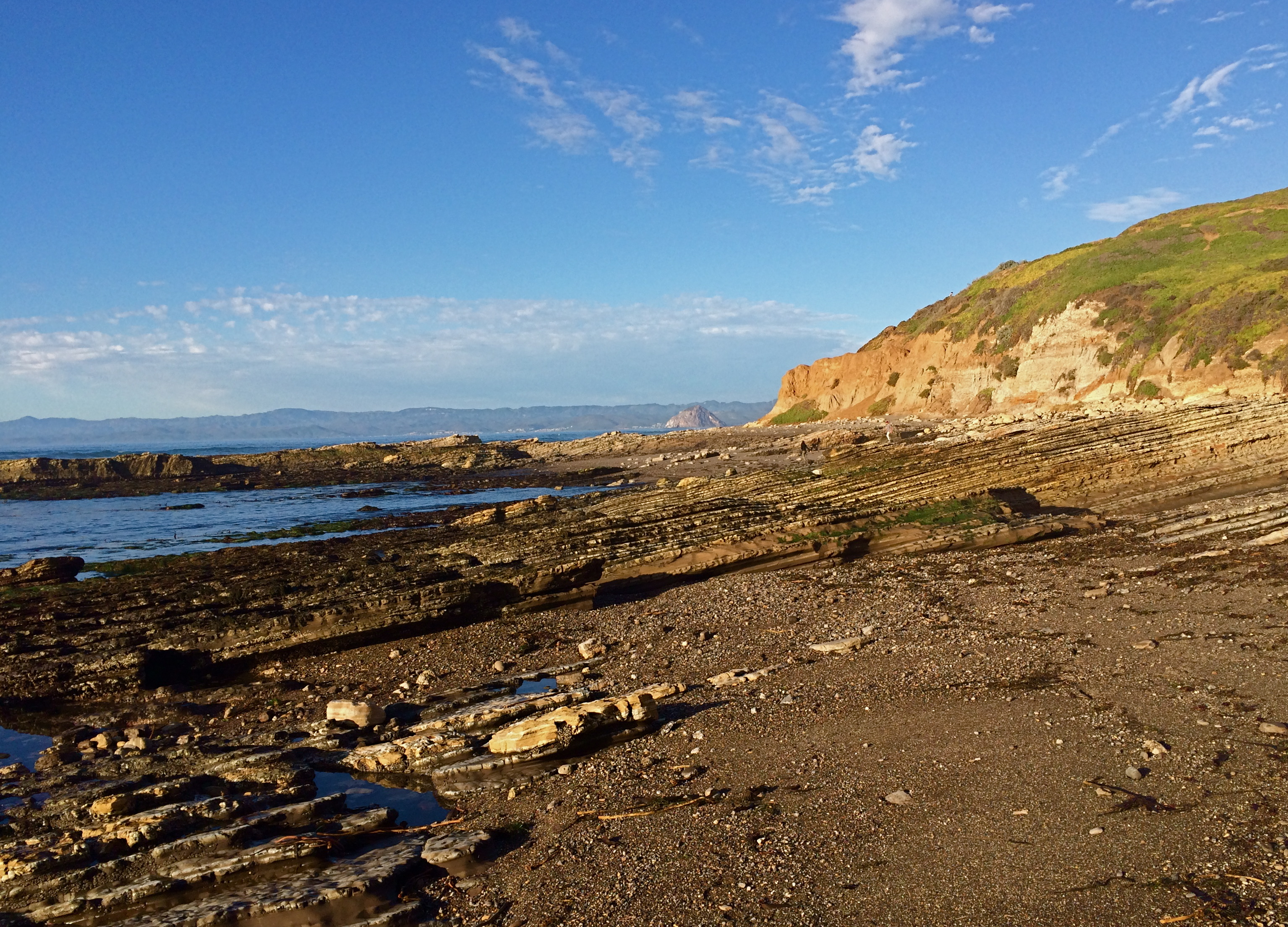
Upper Miocene Migeulito member exposed at Hazard Reef, Montana de Oro State Park. This is the first onshore outcrop of the Monterey Formation south of the Monterey Peninsula. Large exposures continue south along the coast, often associated with important oilfields.

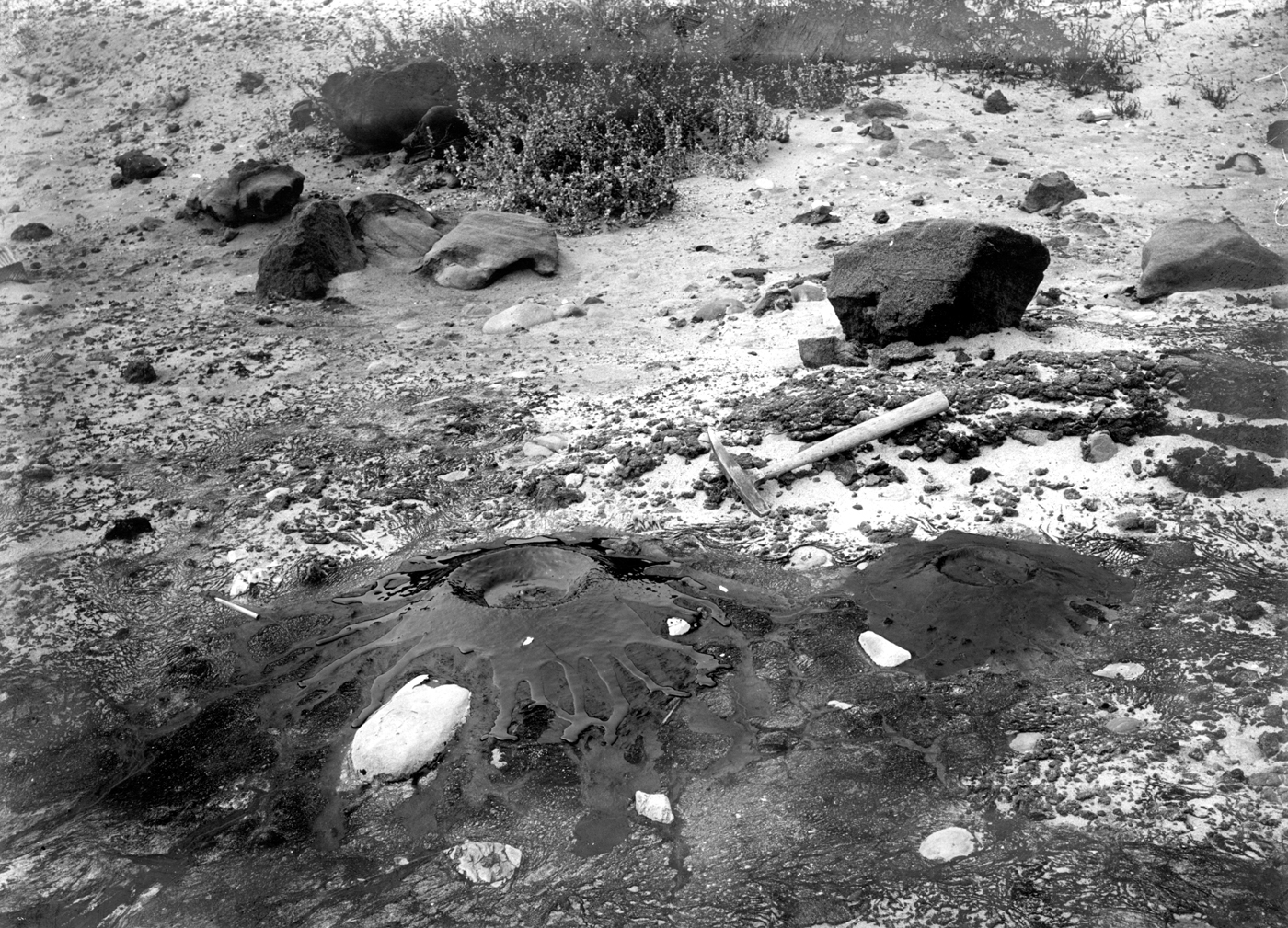
Tar "volcano" in the old Carpinteria Asphalt mine. Heavy oil exudes from joint cracks in the upturned Monterey shale forming the floor of mine. 1906 photo, U.S. Geological Survey Bulletin 321

External image
- Out-of-phase detachment folds and low-angle faults in the Monterey Formation at “the Boathouse” section, Vandenberg Air Force Base

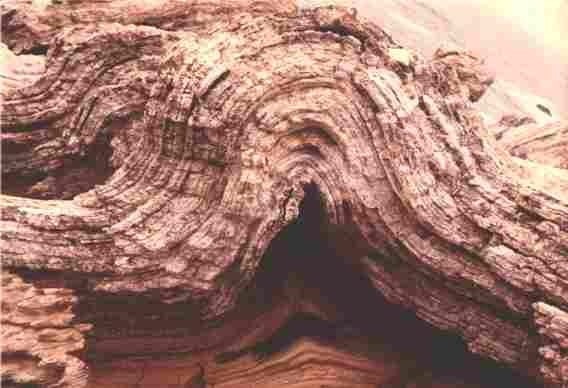
Fold in Monterey Formation

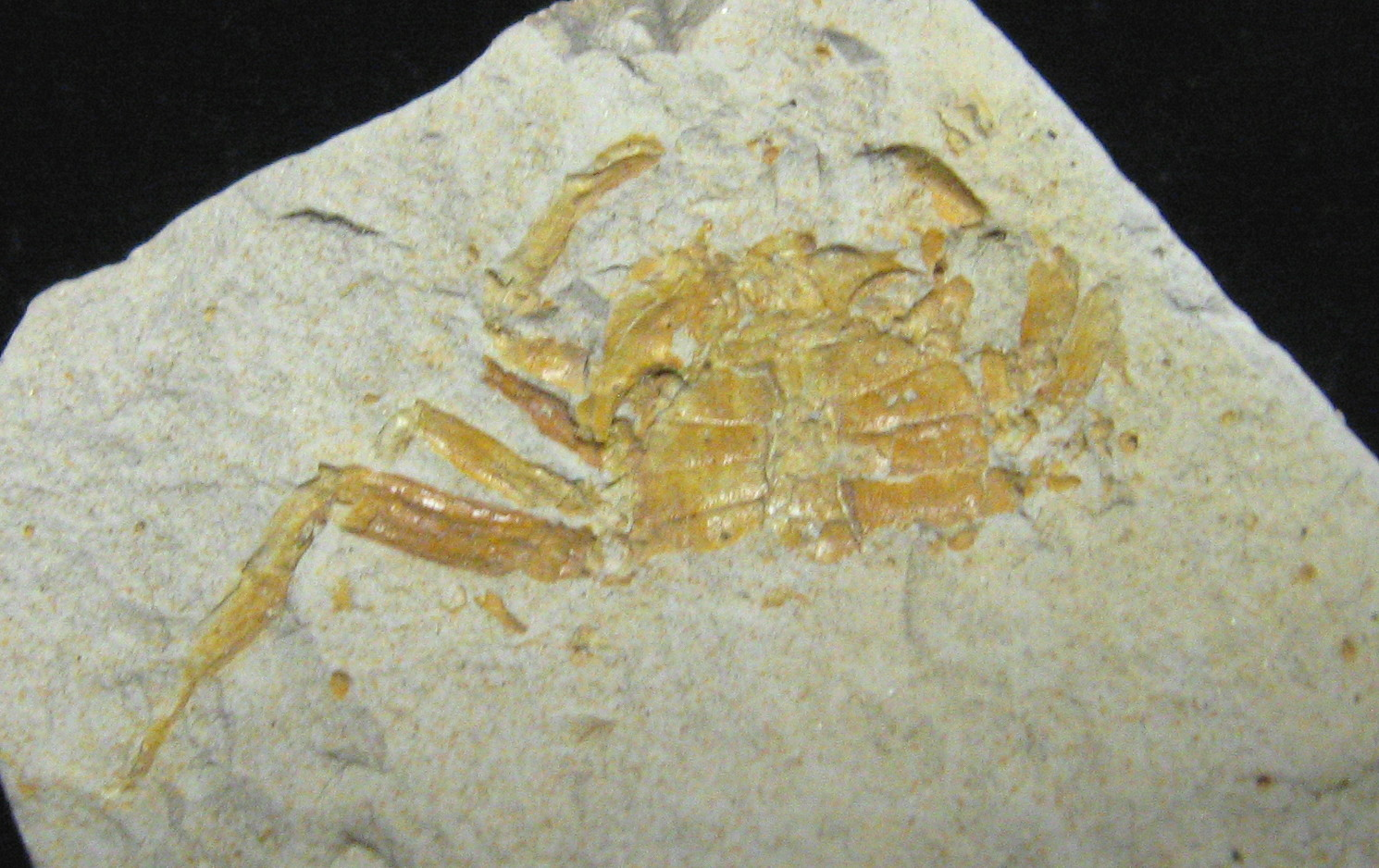
Fossil crab (Pinnixa galliheri), Monterey Formation, Pacific Grove, California. Carapace is about 3 cm. wide.

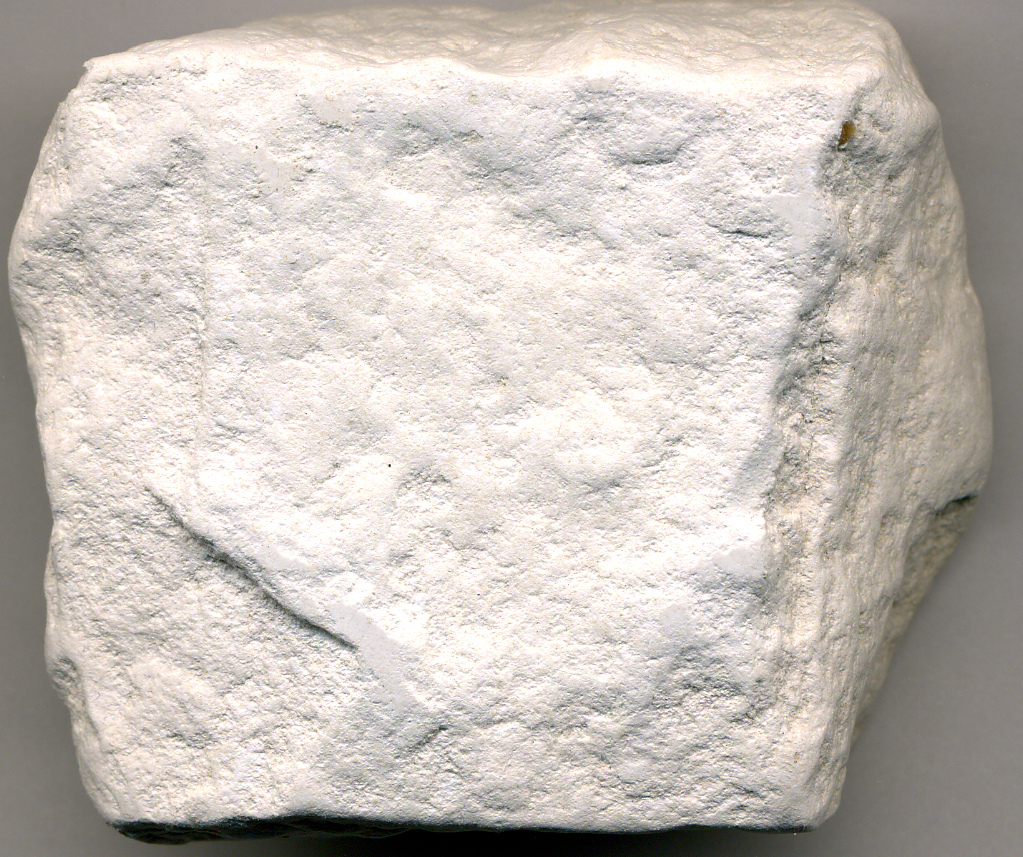
Diatomite (diatomaceous earth), Monterey Formation, from a diatomite quarry just south of Lompoc

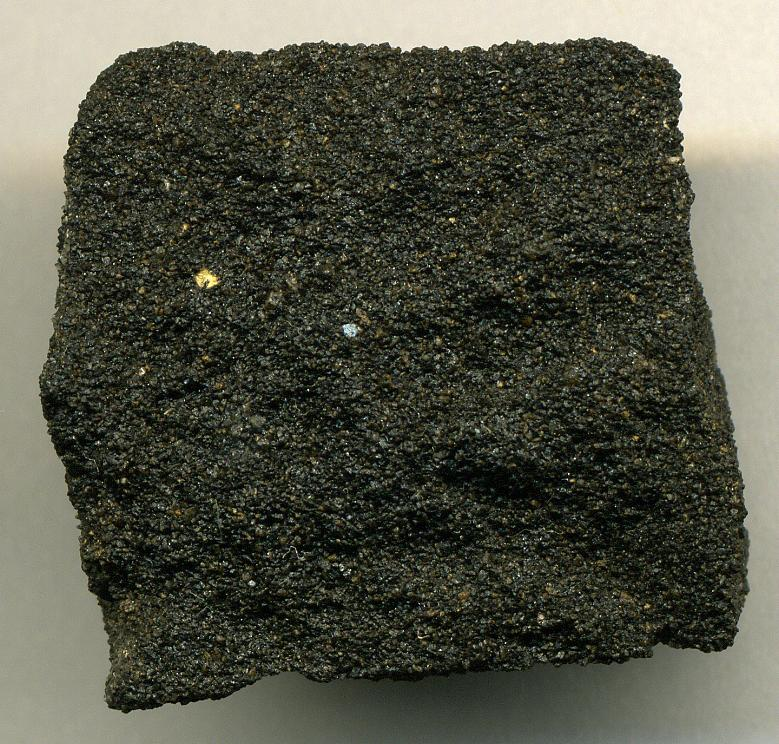
Heavy oil saturated sandstone from a unit of the Monterey Formation.

The Monterey Formation is an extensive Miocene oil-rich geological sedimentary formation in California, with outcrops of the formation in parts of the California Coast Ranges, Peninsular Ranges, and on some of California's off-shore islands. The type locality is near the city of Monterey, California. The Monterey Formation is the major source-rock for 37 to 38 billion barrels of oil in conventional traps such as sandstones. This is most of California's known oil resources. The Monterey has been extensively investigated and mapped for petroleum potential, and is of major importance for understanding the complex geological history of California. Its rocks are mostly highly siliceous strata that vary greatly in composition, stratigraphy, and tectono-stratigraphic history.

The US Energy Information Administration (EIA) estimated in 2014 that the 1,750 square mile Monterey Formation could, as an unconventional resource, yield about 600 million barrels of oil, from tight oil contained in the formation, down sharply from their 2011 estimate of a potential 15.4 billion barrels. An independent review by the California Council on Science and Technology found both of these estimates to be "highly uncertain." Despite intense industry efforts, there has been little success to date (2013) in producing Monterey-hosted tight oil/shale oil, except in places where it is already naturally fractured, and it may be many years, if ever, before the Monterey becomes a significant producer of shale oil.

The Monterey Formation strata vary. Its lower Miocene members show indications of weak coastal upwelling, with fossil assemblages and calcareous-siliceous rocks formed from diatoms and coccolithophorids. Its middle and upper Miocene upwelling-rich assemblages, and its unique highly siliceous rocks from diatom-rich plankton, became diatomites, porcelainites, and banded cherts. It generally dates to between 16 and 7 million years ago, but some sections are as early as 18 million years old or as young as 6 million years old. Most of the formation's sediments appear to represent siliceous shales deposited at the edge of the continental shelf or in abyssal plains in the lower to middle bathyal zone. These deep-sea sediments were brought to the surface via tectonic activity. A similar depositional environment and geologic history is known for the adjacent, contemporaneous Modelo Formation, which preserves a similar paleobiota.

== Shale oil resources and exploitation ==
The Monterey formation has long been recognized as the primary source of the oil produced from other formations in Southern California; the Monterey itself has been very productive where it is naturally fractured. Since 2011, the possibility that hydraulic fracturing might make the Monterey Shale productive over large areas has gained widespread public attention.

According to the US Energy Information Administration (EIA) in 2011, the 1,750-square-mile (4,500 km^{2}) Monterey Shale Formation contained more than half of the United States's total estimated technically recoverable shale oil (tight oil contained in shale, as distinct from oil shale) resource, about 15.4 billion barrels (2.45×10^{9} m^{3}). In 2012, the EIA revised its recoverable volume downward, to 13.7 billion barrels (2.18×10^{9} m^{3}). As of 2013 advances in hydraulic fracturing commonly called "fracking," and the high price of oil resulted in spirited bidding by oil companies for leases. Occidental Petroleum and Venoco were reported to have been major players. The deposit lies 6,000 and 15,000 feet (1,800 and 4,600 m) below the surface.

A widely cited March 2013 study released by the University of Southern California (USC) estimated that if extensive resource play development of the Monterey through hydraulic fracturing were successful, it could generate as many as 2.8 million jobs and as much as $24.6 billion in state and local taxes. However, observers have pointed out that as of 2012, however large its theoretical potential, no one as yet has succeeded in making the Monterey Shale widely economic through hydraulic fracturing; to date it has been economic only in those limited locations already naturally fractured.

Richard Behl, a geology professor who heads the "Monterey And Related Sediments" (MARS) consortium at California State University Long Beach, said that "The [EIA] numbers probably were overblown, but it was a simple method and had an essence of truth." Compared to other shale oil plays, the Monterey formation is much thicker and more laterally extensive, but also much more geologically complex and deformed. See the linked photos from a field trip to Monterey outcrops at Vandenberg Air Force Base. "To say California geology is complex is an understatement. ... The Monterey play is no slam-dunk." In 2013, Bakken shale-oil pioneer Harold Hamm said the Monterey "might have a lot of potential, but there are reasons why it’s not being produced."

J. David Hughes, a Canadian geoscientist and Fellow of Post Carbon Institute, published a report in December 2013 analyzing the assumptions behind the EIA's forecast of Monterey tight oil production and the USC's forecast of resulting job and tax revenue growth. He found the EIA report's assumptions on prospective well productivity to be "extremely optimistic," and the total estimate of 15.4 billion barrels of recoverable oil "highly overstated." He also found the USC study's assumption that development of the Monterey shale could increase California oil production as much as seven-fold to be "unfounded," and the economic projections regarding jobs and tax revenue to be "extremely suspect."

=== Source rock ===
The Monterey Formation is considered the source of 84% of the oil in known fields of the San Joaquin Basin, a total of 12.2 billion barrels of oil. Of this, 112 million barrels of oil in known fields is produced from the Monterey itself.

The Monterey formation is the source for such giant oilfields as the Kern River, Elk Hills, Midway-Sunset Oil Field, and probable source for the overlying North and South Belridge Oil Fields.

=== History ===
Monterey Formation oil was discovered at the Orcutt Oil Field in the Santa Maria Basin of Santa Barbara County in 1901. This was quickly followed by other Monterey discoveries nearby, including the Cat Canyon Oil Field and Lompoc Oil Field. Each of these early Monterey discoveries depended on natural fractures in the Monterey.

The Monterey Formation is one of the reservoirs in the Elk Hills Oil Field as well as one of the reservoirs (Belridge Diatomite) of the Lost Hills Oil Field, both located in Kern County.

Major Monterey production was also discovered in offshore oil fields, such as the South Ellwood Oil Field in the Santa Barbara Channel, and the Point Arguello Field in the Santa Maria Basin.

The North Shafter and Rose oil fields of Kern County, which produce primarily from the Monterey Formation, were discovered in 1983, but attempts to produce the oil have not been highly economic. Some horizontal wells were drilled in the Rose field in the early 2000s, with 2,500-foot lateral lengths and single-stage open-hole fracs; the results were said to be improvements over vertical wells.

Carbon dioxide injection has been tested in the Monterey shale, with mixed results. "The main problem was that the carbon dioxide didn't increase production as much as hoped. ... That could be because the rock formation is so jumbled up, it's hard to find the right spot in which to inject the carbon dioxide."

Oil companies such as Occidental Petroleum are using acidizing to stimulate production in Monterey wells, and other companies are experimenting with proprietary mixes of hydrochloric and hydrofluoric acids. "There's a lot of discussion around the Monterey Shale that it doesn't require fracking, that acidizing will be enough to open up the rock," said Chris Faulkner, chief executive officer of Breitling Oil and Gas.

=== Opposition and regulation ===
The Monterey Formation underlies the southern half of the San Joaquin Valley, a prime agricultural region. The possibility of environmental damage has caused some farmers in Kern County to press for close regulation of hydraulic fracturing.

Opponents say that hydraulic fracturing poses risks in the seismically active region.

The California legislature passed a bill regulating fracking in September 2013. Some environmentalists criticised the bill as being too lax. Some environmentalists promised not to rest until fracking is banned completely. Oil industry representatives criticized the bill as too restrictive. The measure was supported by state Sen. Fran Pavley, author of a fracking bill defeated the previous year. The bill, which Governor Jerry Brown promised to sign, provided for disclosure of chemical used, pre-testing of nearby water wells, and a study on environmental and safety issues to be completed by January 2015. Given the very limited success with fracking the Monterey to date, some find the controversy "much ado about little."

In Santa Barbara County, Santa Maria Energy LLC (SME) has proposed a total of 136 wells in the Monterey formation that would use cyclic steam injection to produce tight oil. In 2013, the county planning commission declined its staff's recommendation to approve the project, calling for more study on concerns raised by environmentalists about greenhouse-gas emissions. The County Board of Supervisors approved the proposed project on November 18, 2013, and SME was cited as a model operator and applicant during the proceedings.

== Vertebrate paleofauna ==
The Monterey Formation preserves a very diverse, primarily marine assemblage of fossil taxa. The most diverse assemblage with the most well-preserved, articulated specimens originates from the presumably Tortonian-aged diatomite deposits exposed in the former Celite Company/Johns Mansfield quarry in Lompoc. However, the age and even formation of these deposits is disputed, as some sources attribute them to the overlying Sisquoc Formation instead.

=== Cartilaginous fish ===
Based on the Paleobiology Database:

Genus	Species	Location	Member	Material	Notes	Images
Carcharhinus	C. sp.	Leisure World			A requiem shark.	
Carcharodon	C. arnoldi	Lompoc			A relative of the great white shark.	
Carcharodon	C. hastalis	Lompoc			A relative of the great white shark.	
Carcharodon	C. planus	Leisure World			A relative of the great white shark.	
Cetorhinus	C. sp.	Leisure World			A relative of the basking shark.	
Galeocerdo	G. aduncus	Aliso Viejo			A relative of the tiger shark.	
Hexanchus	H. sp.				A sixgill shark.	
Isurus	I. sp.				A mako shark.	
Myliobatis sp.		Laguna Niguel, Leisure World			An eagle ray.	
Otodus	O. megalodon	Altamira Shale, Laguna Niguel, Leisure World, El Toro	Altamira Shale, Lower		A megatooth shark, the megalodon.	
Sphyrna	S. sp.	Laguna Niguel			A hammerhead shark.	
Strongyliscus	S. robustus	Lompoc		Isolated dorsal spine	A bullhead shark.	

=== Bony fish ===
Based on Fierstine et al (2012) and the Paleobiology Database.

Genus	Species	Location	Member	Material	Notes	Images
Acipenseridae indet.		Mission Viejo		Disarticulated partial skeleton.	A sturgeon of uncertain affinities.	
Achrestogrammus	A. achrestus	Lompoc		Articulated partial skeleton	A presumed greenling.	
Araeosteus	A. rothi	Lompoc		Articulated skeletons	A relative of the prowfish.	
Argyropelecus	A. affinis		Valmonte Diatomite	Articulated skeletons, whereabouts uncertain	The modern Pacific hatchetfish.	
Argyropelecus	A. bullockii	Lompoc		Articulated skeletons	A marine hatchetfish.	
Bathylagus	B. angelensis	Bairdstown, El Modena, Lompoc		Articulated skeletons	A deep-sea smelt.	
Bolbocara	B. gyrinus	Lompoc		Articulated skeleton	A grenadier.	
Chauliodus	C. eximius	Lompoc		Articulated skeletons	A viperfish.	
Cyclothone (=Rogenio)	C. cf. solitudinis	Bairdstown		Articulated skeleton	A bristlemouth.	
Cyclothone (=Rogenio)	C. sp.	El Modena		Articulated skeleton	A bristlemouth.	
Cynoscion	C. eprepes	Lompoc		Partial articulated skeletons	A weakfish.	
Decapterus	D. hopkinsi			Articulated skeletons	A mackerel scad.	
Drimys	D. defensor		Lompoc	Articulated skeleton	A barracudina.	
Eclipes	E. cf. extensus		Altamira Shale	Articulated skeletons	A cod.	
Eclipes	E. manni	Lompoc		Articulated skeletons	A cod.	
Eclipes	E. veternus	El Modena		Articulated skeletons	A cod.	
Emmachaere	E. rhomalea (=E. rhachites)	Lompoc		Articulated skeletons.	A goosefish.	
Eoscorpius	E. primaevus	Bairdstown		Lost partial skeleton	A presumed sablefish, but potentially a scombrid.	
Etringus	E. sp.		Altamira Shale	Scales	A herring.	
Eriquius	E. plectrodes	Lompoc		Articulated skeleton.	A surfperch.	
Eritima	E. evides	Bairdstown		Articulated skeleton.	A cardinalfish.	
Euleptorhamphus	E. peronides	Lompoc		Articulated skeletons.	A halfbeak. Attribution to Euleptorhamphus doubted.	
Euzaphleges	E. longurio	Lompoc		Articulated skeletons.	A euzaphlegid scombroid.	
Evesthes	E. jordani	Lompoc		Articulated skeletons.	A large-tooth flounder.	
Forfex	F. hypuralis	Pine Canyon		Articulated skeleton	A forficid beloniform.	
Ganoessus	G. clepsydra	El Modena		Articulated skeleton.	A herring.	
Ganoessus	G. michaelis		Buttle	Articulated skeleton.	A herring.	
Ganolytes	G. aratus	Lompoc		Articulated skeleton.	A herring.	
Gasterosteus	G. aculeatus	Lompoc		Articulated skeletons.	The modern three-spined stickleback.	
Hexagrammidae indet.		Lompoc		Lost headless skeleton	A greenling.	
Hippoglossoides	H. pristinus	Lompoc		Articulated skeleton	A righteye flounder.	
Hipposyngnathus	H. imporcitor	Lompoc		Articulated skeletons	A pipefish.	
Ioscion	I. morgani	Lompoc		Lost partial articulated skeleton	An ioscionid percomorph, potential carangid affinities.	
Istiophoridae indet.				Predentary	A marlin of uncertain affinities.	
Lampanyctus (=Engraulites)	L. remifer	Lompoc		Articulated skeletons.	A lanternfish, formerly considered an anchovy.	
Lampanyctinae indet.		Lompoc		Articulated skeleton	A lanternfish.	
Lampris	L. zatima	Lompoc, El Capitan Beach		Articulated partial skeletons	A relative of the opah.	
Lirosceles	L. elegans	Lompoc		Articulated skeleton	A cottid sculpin.	
Lompoquia	L. culveri	Lompoc		Articulated skeleton	A drumfish.	
Lompoquia	L. retropes	Lompoc		Articulated skeleton	A drumfish.	
Makaira	M. nigricans (sensu lato)			Rostral fragment	The modern blue marlin.	
Megalops	?M. vigilax (=Starrias ischyrus)	Lompoc		Articulated partial skeleton	A tarpon.	
Molidae indet.					An ocean sunfish.	
Ocystias	O. sagitta	Lompoc		Lost articulated skeleton	A scombrid.	
Ophiodon	O. ozymandias	Lompoc		Partial articulated segment	A relative of the lingcod.	
Opisthonema	O. palosverdensis		Altamira Shale	Articulated skeleton	A thread herring.	
Ozymandias	O. gilberti	Lompoc		Vertebral segment, skull	A scombrid.	
Paralichthys	P. antiquus	Lompoc		Head, body fragment	A large-tooth flounder.	
Plectrites	P. classeni	Lompoc		Articulated skeletons	A seabream.	
Pleuronichthys	P. veliger	Lompoc		Articulated skeleton	A righteye flounder.	
Protanthias	P. fossilis	Lompoc		Articulated skeleton	An anthias.	
Pseudoseriola	P. sanctaeineziae	Lompoc		Articulated skeleton	A relative of the bluefish.	
Quaesita	Q. quisquilia	El Modena		Articulated skeletons	A deep-sea smelt.	
Quisque	Q. gilberti	El Modena		Slab with numerous articulated skeletons.	A herring.	
Rythmias	R. starri	Lompoc		Articulated skeletons	A seabream.	
Sarda	S. stockii	Lompoc		Lost partial skeleton	A bonito.	
Scomber	S. cf. japonicus (=Turio wilburi, T. culveri, Thyrsion velox, Pneumatophorus cf. grex)	Lompoc		Articulated skeletons	A true mackerel, tentatively referred to the modern chub mackerel.	
Scomber	S. sanctaemonicae (=Auxides sanctaemonicae)	Brown's Canyon		Partial articulated skeleton	A true mackerel.	
Scomberessus	S. acutillus	El Modena		Articulated skeletons.	A saury, possibly conspecific with Scomberesox edwardsi.	
Scorpaena	S. ensiger	El Modena		Articulated skeletons	A scorpionfish.	
Scorpaenidae indet. (=Lutjanus hagari)		El Modena		Articulated skeleton	A scorpionfish, potentially in Stereolepis.	
Sebastes	S. apostates	Lompoc		Articulated skeletons	A rockfish.	
Sebastes	S. davidi	Lompoc		Articulated skeletons	A rockfish.	
Sebastes	S. defunctus	Lompoc		Articulated skeletons	A rockfish.	
Sebastes	S. ineziae	Lompoc		Articulated skeletons	A rockfish.	
Sebastes	S. longirostris	Lompoc		Articulated skeletons	A rockfish.	
Sebastes	S. porteousi	Lompoc		Articulated skeletons	A rockfish.	
Sebastes	S. thermophilus	Lompoc		Articulated skeletons	A rockfish.	
Sebastes	S. velox	Lompoc		Articulated skeletons	A rockfish.	
Sebastinus	S. sp.	Lompoc		Lost specimen	A rockfish.	
Seriola	S. sanctaebarbarae	Lompoc		Articulated skeletons	An amberjack.	
Syngnathus	S. avus	Bairdstown, El Modena		Articulated skeletons	A pipefish.	
Thyrsocles	T. kriegeri	Lompoc		Articulated skeletons	A euzaphlegid.	
Thunnus	T. starksi	Lompoc		Articulated skeleton, head fragment	A tuna.	
Thunnus	T. sp.		Altamira Shale	Articulated skeleton, fragments	A tuna.	
Trossulus	?T. exoletus	Lompoc		Lost articulated skeletons	A presumed euzaphlegid.	
Tunita	T. octavia	El Modena		Partial articulated skeleton	A scombrid.	
Xestias	X. iratus	Lompoc		Skull, articulated skeleton	A scombrid.	
Xyne	X. grex	Lompoc		Multiple slabs with numerous articulated skeletons	A herring, known from huge fossilized mass mortality assemblages of spawning individuals.	
Xyrinius	X. barbarae	Carpenteria		Lost skeletons	A herring that may be potentially conspecific with Xyne grex. It is uncertain whether X. houshi is from the Monterey Formation.	
Xyrinius	X. elmodenae	El Modena		Lost skeletons	A herring that may be potentially conspecific with Xyne grex. It is uncertain whether X. houshi is from the Monterey Formation.	
Xyrinius	?X. houshi			Lost skeletons	A herring that may be potentially conspecific with Xyne grex. It is uncertain whether X. houshi is from the Monterey Formation.	
Zanteclites	Z. hubbsi	Bairdstown		Articulated skeleton	A Neotropical silverside.	
Zelosis	Z. hadleyi	El Modena		Articulated skeleton	A halfbeak.	

=== Birds ===
Based on the Paleobiology Database:

Genus	Species	Location	Member	Material	Notes	Images
Aethia	A. rossmoori		Lower		An auklet.	
Alcodes	A. ulnulus		Lower		A Lucas auk.	
Cerorhinca	C. dubia	Lompoc			A relative of the rhinoceros auklet.	
Cerorhinca	C. sp.		Lower		A relative of the rhinoceros auklet.	
Diomedea	D. sp.				A great albatross.	
Fulmarus	F. hammeri		Lower		A fulmar.	
Gavia	G. brodkorbi				A loon.	
Limosa	L. vanrossemi	Lompoc			A godwit.	
Morus	M. lompocanus	Lompoc, Monterey			A gannet.	
Morus	M. magnus				A gannet.	
Morus	M. media (=Miosula)	Lompoc			A gannet.	
Morus	M. willetti (=Sula willetti)	Lompoc			A gannet.	
Microsula	M. sp.		Lower		A sulid.	
Miomancalla	M. wetmorei				A Lucas auk.	
Oceanodroma	O. sp.				A storm petrel.	
Osteodontornis	O. orri	Tepusquet Creek			A pseudotooth bird.	
Palaeoscinis	P. turdirostris	Tepusquet Creek		Articulated skeleton	A songbird.	
Phoebastria	P. anglica				A North Pacific albatross.	
Procellaridae indet.		Tepusquet Creek			A tubenose of uncertain affinities.	
Praemancalla	P. lagunensis		Lower		A Lucas auk.	
Presbychen	P. abavus		Lower		A goose.	
Puffinus	P. barnesi				A shearwater.	
Puffinus	P. calhouni		Lower		A shearwater.	
Puffinus	P. diatomicus	Lompoc			A shearwater.	
Puffinus	P. priscus		Lower		A shearwater.	
Uria	U. brodkorbi	Lompoc		Articulated skeleton.	A murre.	

=== Reptiles ===
Based on the Paleobiology Database:

Genus	Species	Location	Member	Material	Notes	Images
Crocodylia indet.					A crocodilian of uncertain affinities.	
aff. Dermochelys	D. sp.		Lower		A potential relative of the leatherback turtle.	
Psephophorus	P. sp.		Lower		A dermochelyid sea turtle.	

=== Mammals ===
==== Cetaceans ====
Genus	Species	Location	Member	Material	Notes	Images
Albicetus	A. oxymycterus	Santa Barbara			A physeteroid toothed whale.	
Albireonidae indet.		Laguna Niguel			An albireonid toothed whale.	
Atocetus	A. nasalis	Laguna Niguel			A kentriodontid toothed whale.	
"Balaenoptera"	"B." ryani	Monterey Bay			A baleen whale of uncertain affinities.	
Delphinapterinae indet.		Laguna Niguel			A relative of the beluga whale.	
Delphinavus	D. newhalli	Suey Ranch			A delphinidan of uncertain affinities.	
aff. Kampholophos	K. sp.	El Toro			A kentriodontid toothed whale.	
Kogiidae indet.		Laguna Niguel			A relative of the dwarf sperm whales.	
Liolithax	L. kernensis	El Toro, Leisure World			A kentriodontid toothed whale.	
aff. Messapicetus	M. sp.	Laguna Niguel			A beaked whale.	
Mixocetus	M. sp.	Laguna Niguel			A tranatocetid baleen whale.	
Nannocetus	N. sp.	Laguna Niguel			A cetothere.	
Norrisanima	N. miocaena	Lompoc			A stem-rorqual whale.	
Piscolithax	P. tedfordi	Laguna Niguel			A porpoise.	
Pithanodelphis	P. sp.	Laguna Niguel, El Toro			A kentriodontid toothed whale.	
Salumiphocaena	S. stocktoni	Palos Verdes, El Toro	Valmonte		A porpoise.	
Scaldicetus	S. sp.	El Toro			A physeterid toothed whale.	
Zarhinocetus	Z. errabundus	Aliso Viejo	Lower		An allodelphinid toothed whale.	

==== Perissodactylans ====
Genus	Species	Location	Member	Material	Notes	Images
Pliohippus	P. sp.	El Toro			An equine.	

==== Desmostylians ====
Genus	Species	Location	Member	Material	Notes	Images
Desmostylus	D. hesperus	Monterey Bay, San Luis Obispo, Solvang, Palos Verdes, Leisure World			A desmostylian.	
Jamilcotatus	J. boreios	Santa Cruz Island			A desmostylian, not officially named.	
Neoparadoxia	N. cecilialina	Mission Viejo			A paleoparadoxiid desmostylian.	
Paleoparadoxia	P. sp.	Palos Verdes, Leisure World	Altamira Shale		A paleoparadoxiid desmostylian.	

==== Carnivorans ====
Genus	Species	Location	Member	Material	Notes	Images
Allodesmus	A. cf. sinanoensis	Leisure World	Lower		A desmatophocid pinniped.	
Atopotarus	A. courseni	Palos Verdes	Altamira		A desmatophocid pinniped.	
Borophagus	B. sp.	El Toro			A borophagine canid.	
Imagotaria	I. downsi	Lompoc, Laguna Niguel, Leisure World			An odobenid pinniped.	
Monachinae indet.		Laguna Niguel			A monachine seal.	
Pithanotaria	P. starri	Lompoc, Mission Viejo, Laguna Niguel			An eared seal.	
Pontolis	P. barroni	Aliso Viejo			An odobenid pinniped.	
Pontolis	P. cf. magnus	Palos Verdes	Valmonte		An odobenid pinniped.	

==== Sirenians ====
Genus	Species	Location	Member	Material	Notes	Images
Dioplotherium	D. allisoni	El Toro	Lower		A dugongid related to the dugong.	
Dusisiren	D. dewana		Upper		A dugongid related to Steller's sea cow.	
Dusisiren	D. jordani	Lompoc, Moulton Ranch, Laguna Niguel, Leisure World			A dugongid related to Steller's sea cow.	
Metaxytherium	M. sp.	Leisure World			A dugongid.	

== Paleoflora ==
The Monterey Formation contains some of the few examples of fossilized non-calcareous algae in the world, which tend to be preserved in diatomite.

=== Brown algae ===
Genus	Species	Location	Member	Material	Notes	Images
Paleocystophora	P. subopposita				A brown algae, family Cystoseiraceae.	
Paleohalidrys	P. californica				A brown algae, family Cystoseiraceae.	
Paleohalidrys	P. occidentalis				A brown algae, family Cystoseiraceae.	
Paleohalidrys	P. superba				A brown algae, family Cystoseiraceae.	
Julescraneia	J. grandicornis				A kelp, family Lessoniaceae.	

=== Plants (green and red algae) ===
Genus	Species	Location	Member	Material	Notes	Images
Caulerpites	C. denticulata				A green alga.	
Chondrides	C. flexilis				A red alga.	
Paleosiphonia	P. oppositiclada				A red alga.	

== See also ==
- Ellwood Oil Field
- Goleta, California
- Los Angeles Basin
- Transverse Ranges
