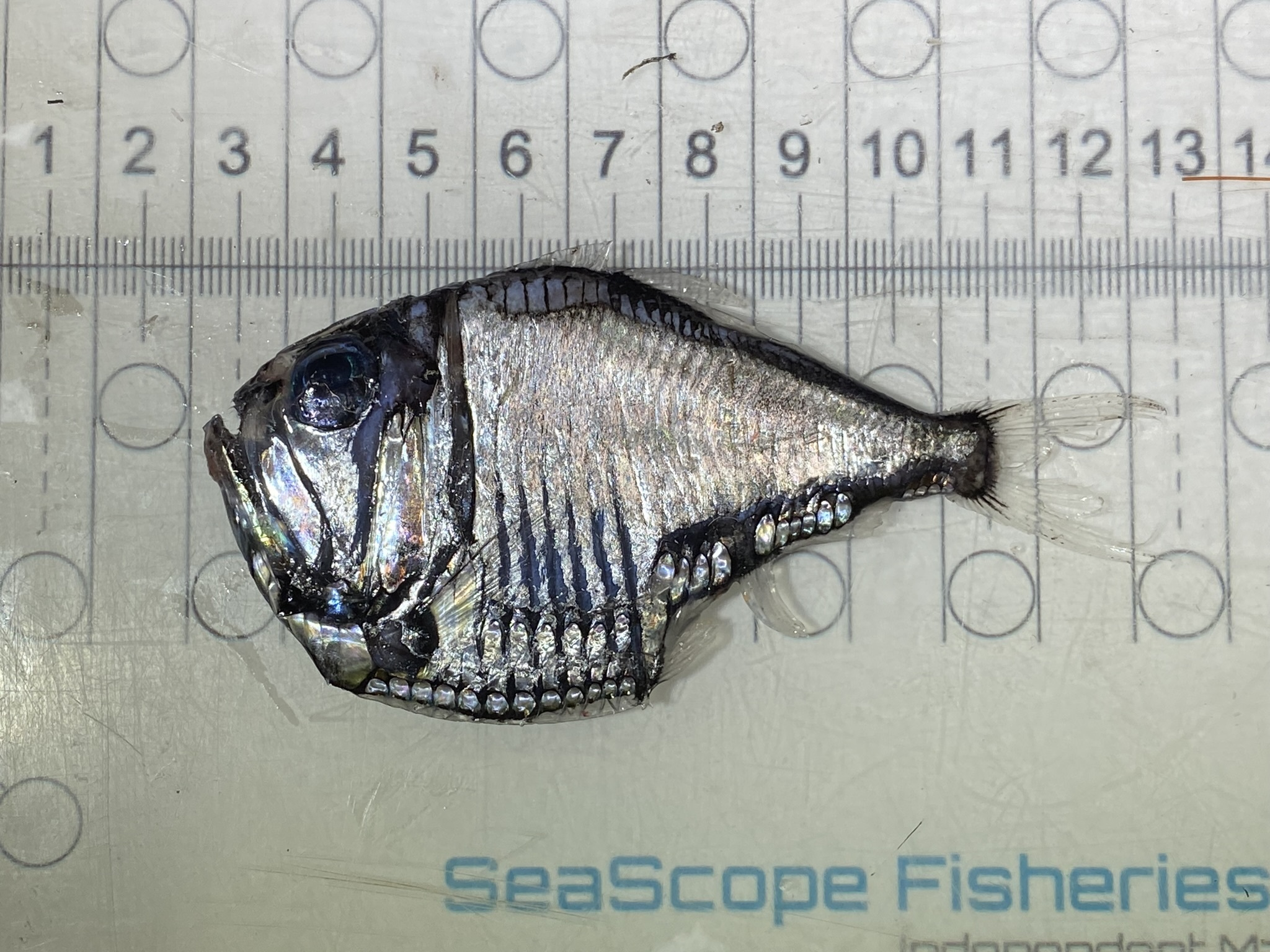
- Photograph
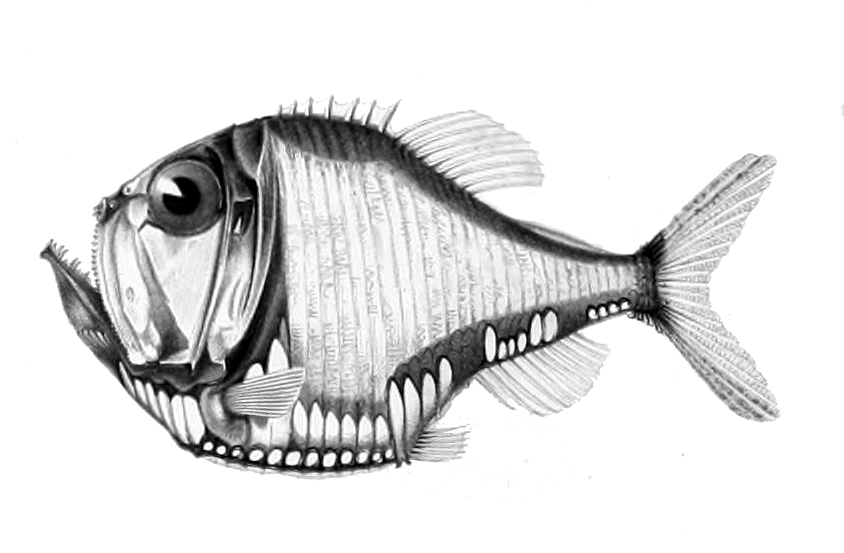
- 1896 illustration

Scientific classification
- Kingdom: Animalia
- Phylum: Chordata
- Class: Actinopterygii
- Order: Stomiiformes
- Family: Sternoptychidae
- Genus: Argyropelecus
- Species: A. olfersii

Binomial name
- Argyropelecus olfersii (Cuvier, 1829)

= Argyropelecus olfersii =

Species of fish

Argyropelecus olfersii is a common species of marine hatchetfish, found in mesopelagic waters.

== Discovery and naming ==
Argyropelecus olfersii was described by Georges Cuvier in Chapter 27 of Histoire Naturelle des Poissons, based on specimens held in the National Museum of Natural History in Paris and the Natural History Museum, Berlin. The specific name honours the German diplomat and natural historian Ignaz von Olfers, who presented the Berlin specimen to the museum upon his return from a diplomatic excursion to Brazil.

== Distribution and habitat ==
A. olfersii is found in temperate waters worldwide, with a preferred temperature range of 5.1-13.3°C. The fish is present in all oceans save the Southern, however records are rare from the Indian Ocean. During daylight hours, subadult and adult fish live at depths of 200–800m, undergoing a vertical migration to 100–600m at sunset.

== Description ==
Like other members of the subfamily Sternoptychinae, Argyropelecus olfersii has a laterally compressed and extremely deep body, contributing to the characteristic "hatchet" shape which the group is named after. This shape, alongside the counterillumination provided by the well-developed ventral photophores, reduces the silhouette of the fish when viewed from beneath, concealing it from potential predators. In addition to the ventral photophores, an eye-facing photophore is found in the snout, used as part of a feedback system to allow the ventral bioluminescence to match the intensity of downwelling light. A. olfersii has a dark, heavily pigmented back and silvered flanks, again helping to reduce visibility in its native midwater habitat. Like all members of the genus Argyropelecus, A. olfersii has dorsally-directed, tubular eyes, which in life have a metallic blue colouration that is rapidly lost in preserved specimens.

A. olfersii is distinguished from other members of the genus by its two postabdominal spines, which are equal in length and curvature. There are 9 rays in the dorsal fin, 10–11 in the pectorals, 6 in the pelvic fin and 12 rays in the anal fin. In addition to these fins, there is a long, low adipose fin on the ventral surface of the tail and a dorsal blade anterior to the dorsal fin. The otoliths in this species are small, and located under the cranium behind the eyes.

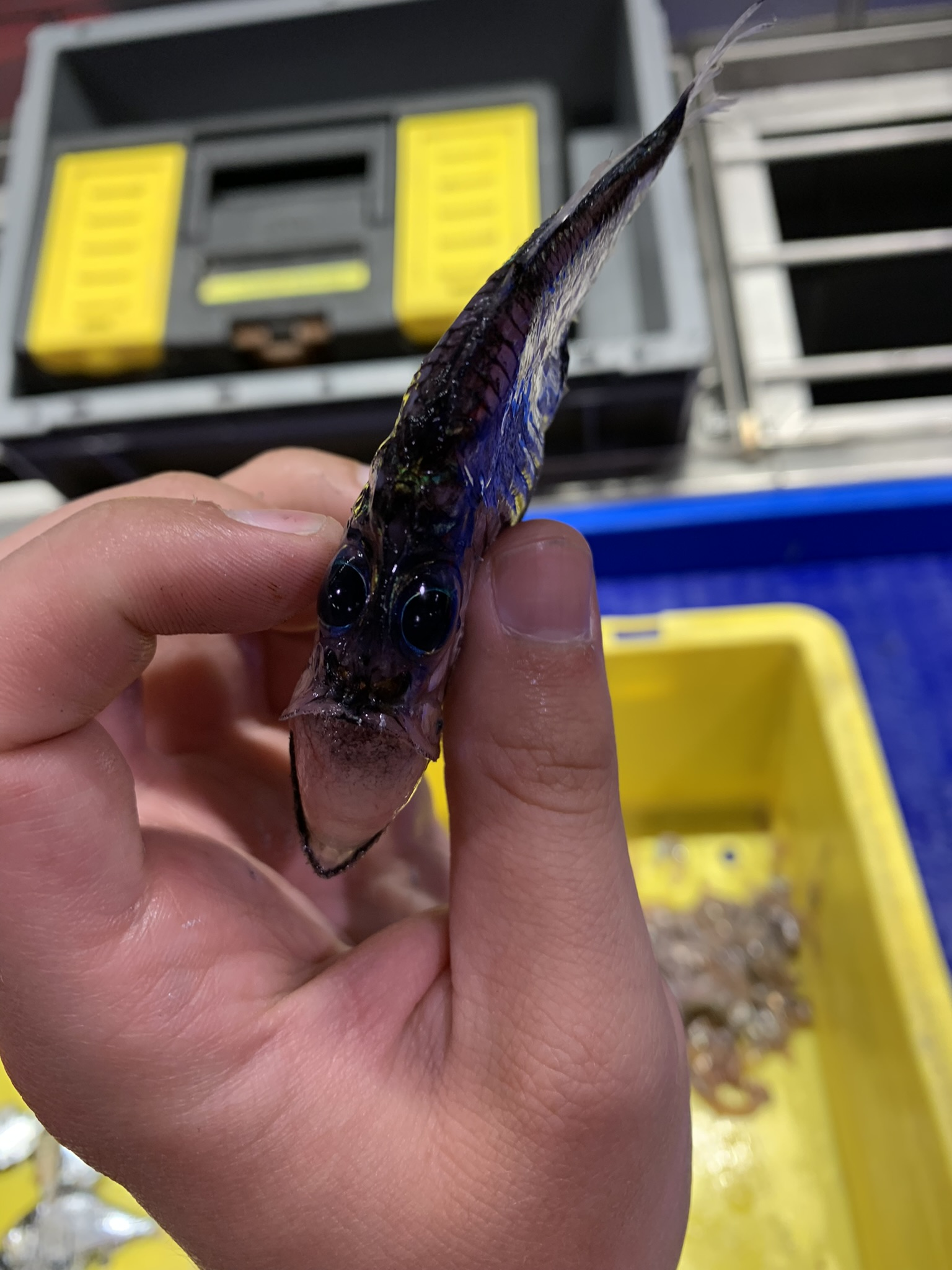
Dorsal view, showing the tubular, dorsally-directed eyes and the dark dorsal colouration, as well as the extreme lateral compression seen in sternoptychine hatchetfish.

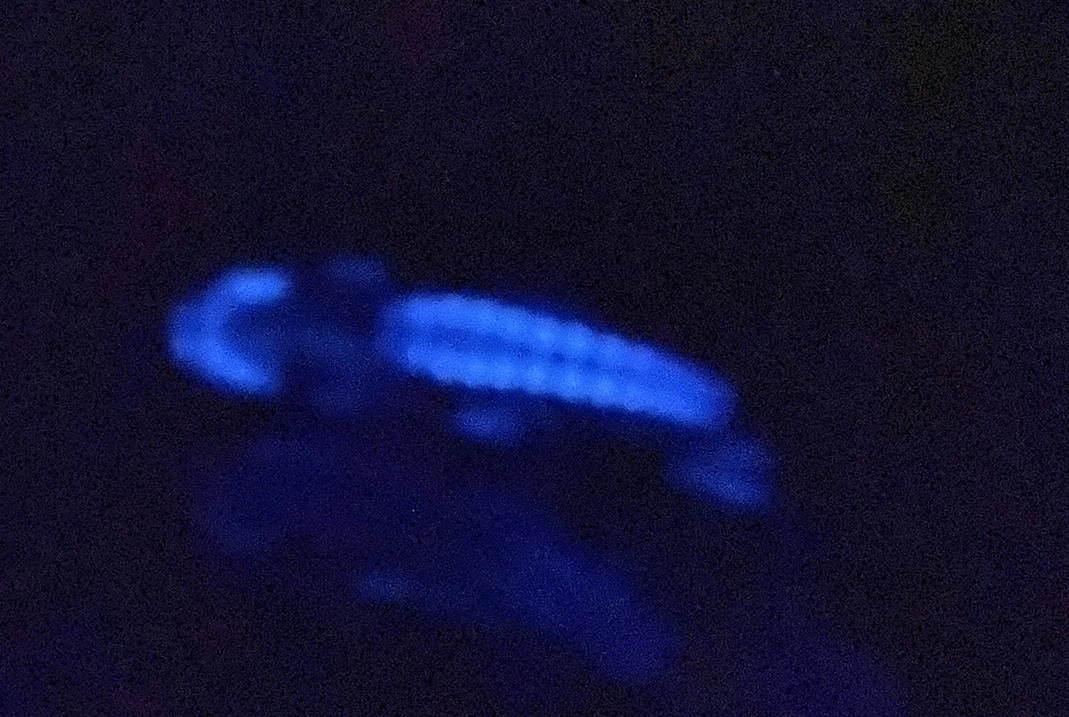
Bioluminescence emitted from the ventral photophores

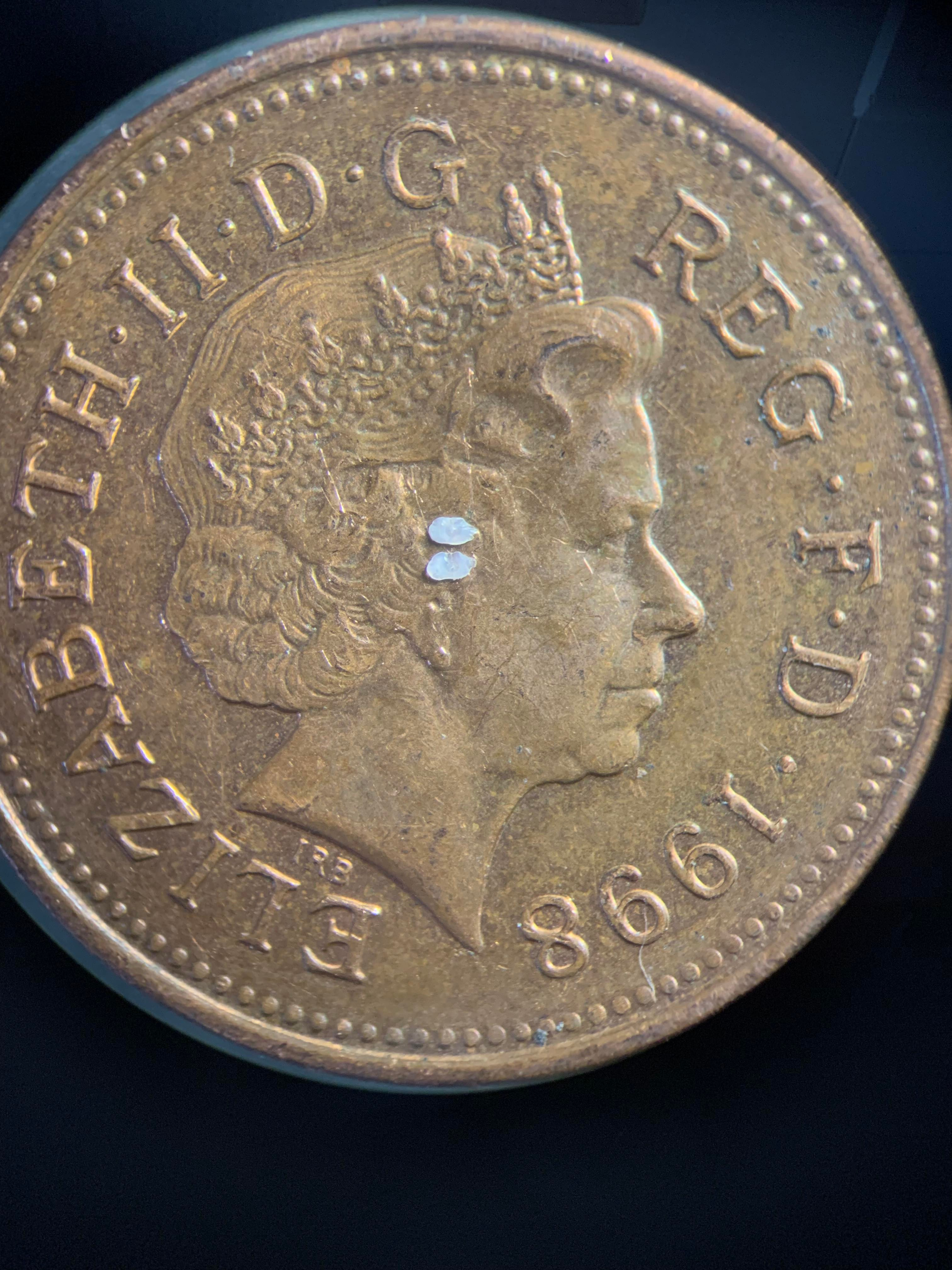
Sagittal otoliths compared to a 1998 British penny

== Ecology ==
Argyropelecus olfersii is a predator, feeding on small fish and crustaceans. Despite being an abundant member of the mesopelagic community, A. olfersii is a relatively poor source of energy, and there is evidence suggesting that it is actively avoided by some marine mammal predators in favour of more energy-rich myctophids.

== Relationship to humans ==
Argyropelecus olfersii is not fished commercially, and has an assessment of Least Concern under the IUCN Redlist. Organohalogen pollutants have been found in A. olfersii specimens caught in the Bay of Biscay.
