= Gavia brodkorbi =

Gavia brodkorbi Temporal range: Clarendonian

Scientific classification
- Kingdom: Animalia
- Phylum: Chordata
- Class: Aves
- Order: Gaviiformes
- Family: Gaviidae
- Genus: Gavia
- Species: †G. brodkorbi

Binomial name
- †Gavia brodkorbi H. Howard, 1978

Extinct species of loon

Gavia brodkorbi is an extinct species of loon from the Clarendonian age from United States. The holotype and only known specimen is a complete left ulna that was collected from the Monterey Formation in Laguna Niguel, California by Marion J. Bohreer in 1969. The ulna is shorter but more stout in comparison to the red-throated loon (G. stellata) and pacific loon (G. pacifica). The area of attachment of the ligaments is different from the extant species, as it is shorter and less oval. Hildegarde Howard would described the bird in 1978 on a paper discussing the Late Miocene seabird fauna of Orange County named the species after Pierce Brodkorb for his contribution for the field of paleornithology including his review of Pliocene loons.
