= Ioscion =

Ioscion Temporal range: Upper Miocene (Tortonian)

Scientific classification
- Kingdom: Animalia
- Phylum: Chordata
- Class: Actinopterygii
- Division: Teleostei
- Order: Acanthuriformes
- Family: Sciaenidae
- Genus: †Ioscion; Jordan, 1921
- Species: †I. morgani

Binomial name
- †Ioscion morgani Jordan, 1921

Extinct genus of fishes

Ioscion morgani is an extinct prehistoric marine ray-finned fish that lived during the Upper Miocene subepoch of what is now the Tortonian-aged Monterey Formation of Southern California. It is primarily known from incomplete fossils, such as the holotype, which consists of a broken backbone. The morphology of the head is unknown.

It was described by David Starr Jordan, who suggested that enough of the animal's anatomy suggests a relationship with the jackfishes of Carangidae. It was moved to its own family, Ioscionidae, by David (1943). However, a 2009 study refuted this placement and found it to be a drumfish based on its anatomy and fin placement.

== See also ==
- Prehistoric fish
- List of prehistoric bony fish
