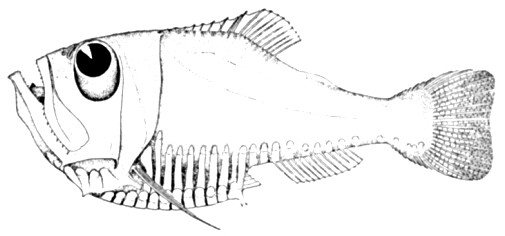

Conservation status
- Least Concern (IUCN 3.1)

Scientific classification
- Kingdom: Animalia
- Phylum: Chordata
- Class: Actinopterygii
- Order: Stomiiformes
- Family: Sternoptychidae
- Genus: Argyropelecus
- Species: A. hemigymnus

Binomial name
- Argyropelecus hemigymnus Cocco, 1829

= Argyropelecus hemigymnus =

Species of fish

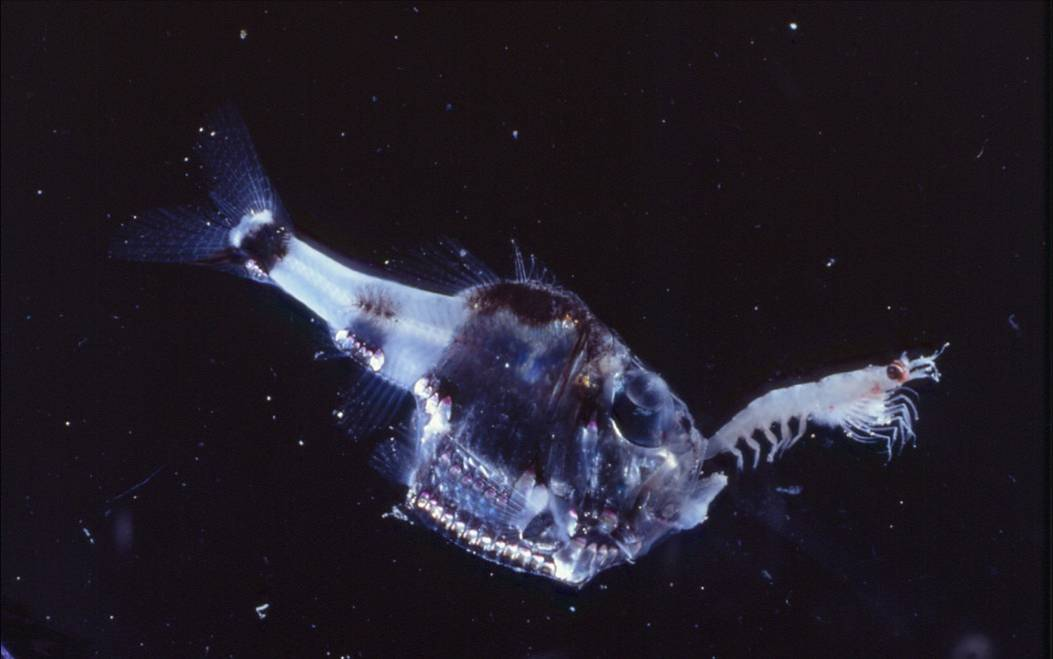

Argyropelecus hemigymnus, the half-naked hatchetfish, short silver hatchetfish or spurred hatchetfish, is a deep-sea hatchetfish of the genus Argyropelecus found mesopelagically in the Atlantic, Indian, and Pacific Oceans as well as in the Mediterranean Sea. It is a small species rarely exceeding 38 millimetres (1.5 in) standard length. It feeds on zooplankton, particularly ostracods and copepods. Sexual maturation occurs at length of about 22 mm, and adult males have more developed olfactory organs than females, i.e. the species is sexually dimorphic.
