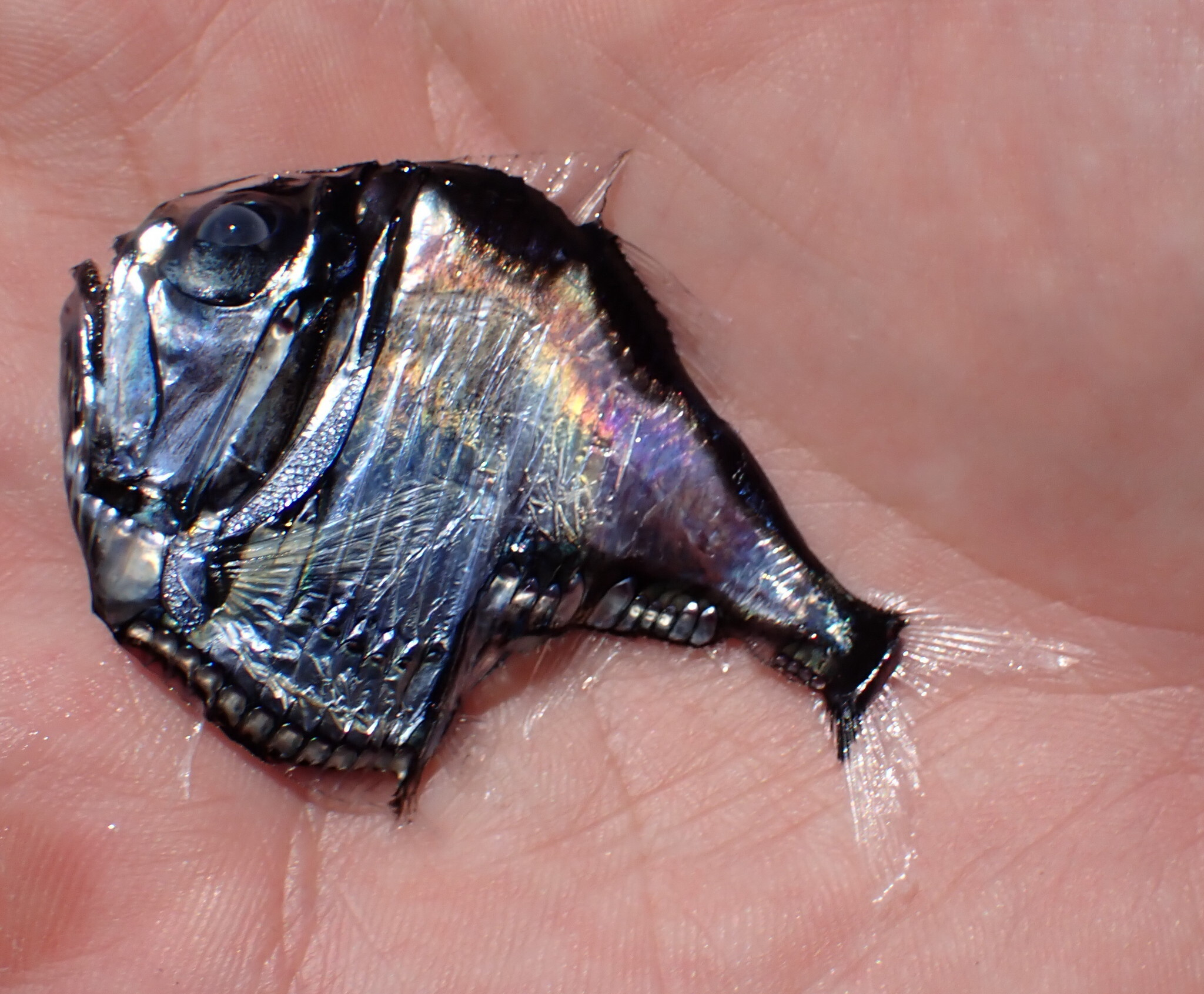
- Argyropelecus aculeatus in Portugal

Scientific classification
- Kingdom: Animalia
- Phylum: Chordata
- Class: Actinopterygii
- Order: Stomiiformes
- Family: Sternoptychidae
- Subfamily: Sternoptychinae

Diversity
- 3 genera, some 40 species

= Marine hatchetfish =

Marine hatchetfishes Temporal range: Middle Eocene–present

Subfamily of fishes

Marine hatchetfishes or deep-sea hatchetfishes are small deep-sea mesopelagic ray-finned fish of the stomiiform subfamily Sternoptychinae. They should not be confused with the freshwater hatchetfishes, which are not particularly closely related Teleostei in the characiform family Gasteropelecidae.

The scientific name means "Sternoptyx-subfamily", from Sternoptyx (the type genus) + the standard animal family suffix "-inae". It ultimately derives from Ancient Greek stérnon (στέρνον, "breast") + ptýx (πτύξ, "a fold/crease") + Latin forma ("external form"), the Greek part in reference to the thorax shape of marine hatchetfishes.

== Description and ecology ==
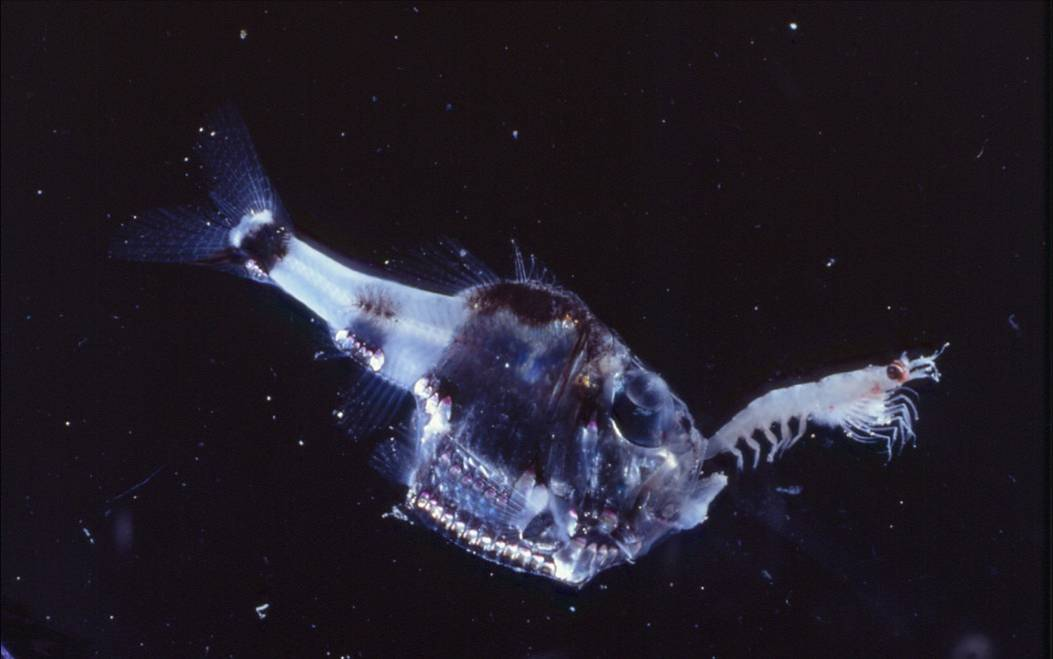
Half-naked hatchetfish, Argyropelecus hemigymnus eating a shrimp

Found in tropical, subtropical and temperate waters of the Atlantic, Pacific and Indian Oceans, marine hatchetfishes range in size from Polyipnus danae at 2.8 cm (1.1 in) to the c.12 cm (4.7 in)-long giant hatchetfish (Argyropelecus gigas). They are small deep-sea fishes which have evolved a peculiar body shape and like their relatives have bioluminescent photophores. The latter allow them to use counter-illumination to escape predators that lurk in the depths: by matching the light intensity with the light penetrating the water from above, the fish does not appear darker if seen from below. They typically occur at a few hundred meters below the surface, but their entire depth range spans from 50 to 1,500 meters deep.

The body is deep and laterally extremely compressed, somewhat resembling a hatchet (with the thorax being the "blade" and the caudal peduncle being the "handle"). The genus Polyipnus is rounded, the other two – in particular Sternoptyx – decidedly angular if seen from the side. Their pelvis is rotated to a vertical position. The mouth is located at the tip of the snout and directed almost straight downwards.

Their scales are silvery, delicate and easily abraded. In some species, such as the highlight hatchetfish (Sternoptyx pseudobscura), large sections of the body at the base of the anal fin and/or caudal fin are transparent. They have perpendicular spines and blade-like pterygiophores in front of the dorsal fin. The anal fin has 11–19 rays and in some species is divided in two parts; almost all have an adipose fin. Their large, sometimes tube-shaped eyes can collect the faintest of light and focus well on objects both close and far. They are directed somewhat upwards, most conspicuously in the genus Argyropelecus. This allows them to discern the silhouettes of prey moving overhead against the slightly brighter upper waters.

== Genera ==
There are three genera in this subfamily, with some 40 species altogether:

- Argyropelecus – silver hatchetfishes (7 species)
- Polyipnus (32 species)
- Sternoptyx (4 species)

Four fossil genera are also known:

- Eosternoptyx (middle-late Eocene of Iran)
- Polyipnoides (middle Eocene of Georgia)
- Horbatshia (Oligocene of the Carpathians)
- Discosternon (Miocene of Italy)
