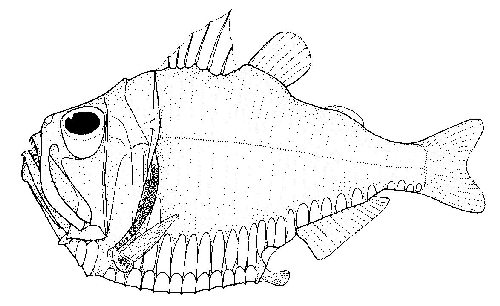
- Drawing by Dr Tony Ayling

Conservation status
- Least Concern (IUCN 3.1)

Scientific classification
- Domain: Eukaryota
- Kingdom: Animalia
- Phylum: Chordata
- Class: Actinopterygii
- Order: Stomiiformes
- Family: Sternoptychidae
- Genus: Argyropelecus
- Species: A. gigas

Binomial name
- Argyropelecus gigas Norman, 1930

= Argyropelecus gigas =

Species of fish

Argyropelecus gigas, the giant hatchetfish or greater silver hatchetfish, is a marine fish of the genus Argyropelecus. It is found in every ocean except the north Pacific in the mesopelagic zone of tropical and subtropical waters. "Giant" in relative terms only, this is the largest species of marine hatchetfishes, often exceeding 110 millimetres (4.3 in) standard length.
