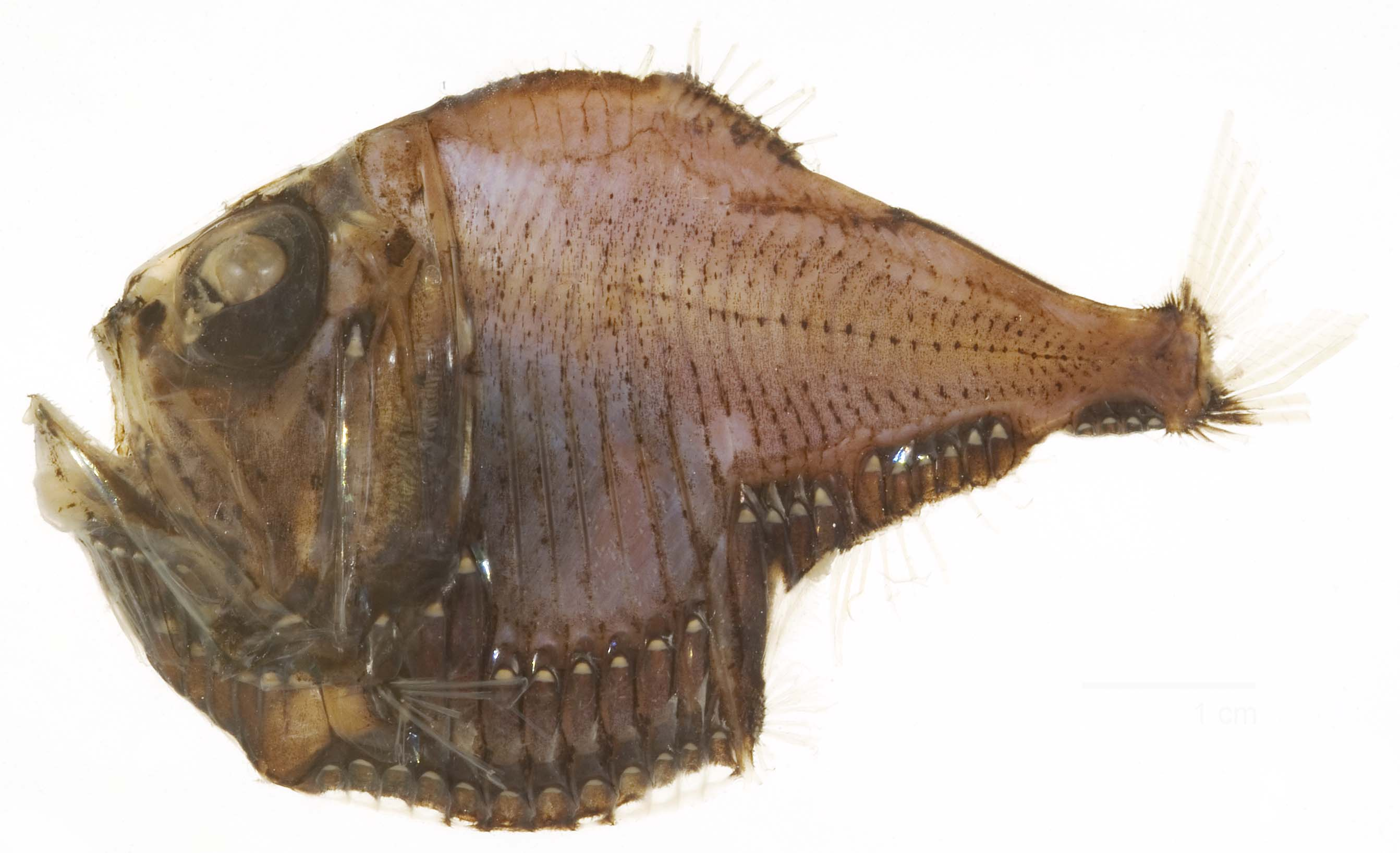

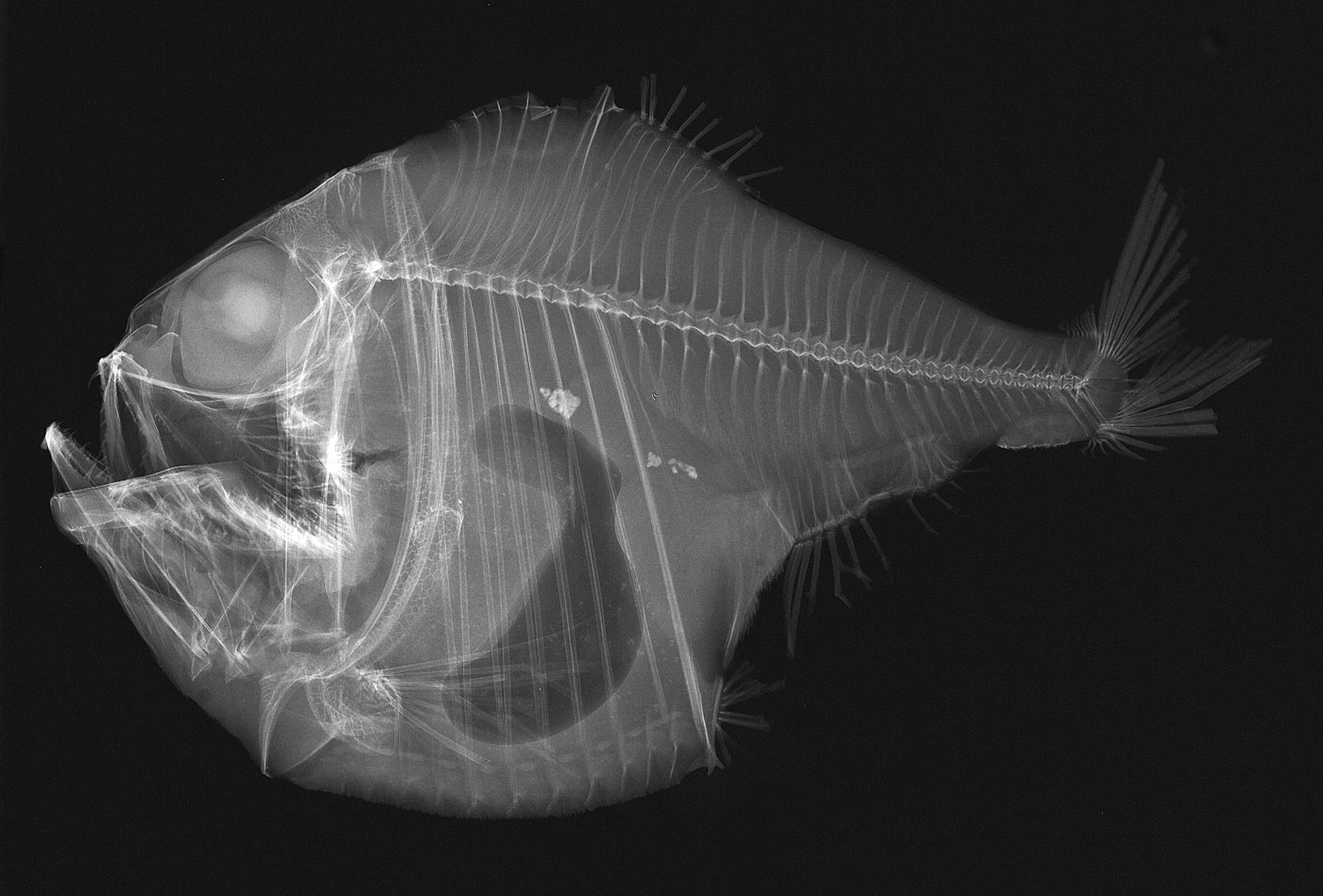
- Argyropelecus lychnus, conventional and X-ray images

Scientific classification
- Kingdom: Animalia
- Phylum: Chordata
- Class: Actinopterygii
- Division: Teleostei
- Order: Stomiiformes
- Family: Sternoptychidae
- Subfamily: Sternoptychinae
- Genus: Argyropelecus; Cocco, 1829

Diversity
- 7 species

= Argyropelecus =

Silver hatchetfishes Temporal range: Bartonian to Present 27.82–0 Ma

Genus of deep sea hatchetfishes

Argyropelecus is an oceanic ray-finned fish genus in the deep sea hatchetfish family Sternoptychidae. A collective name is "silver hatchetfishes", but this can also refer to a species of the freshwater hatchetfishes which are not particularly closely related to this. The large pupils of these marine hatchetfishes enable them to see dim objects in the deep sea, where light barely penetrates.

== Species ==
There are currently seven recognized extant species in this genus:

- Argyropelecus aculeatus Valenciennes, 1850 (lovely hatchetfish, Atlantic silver hatchetfish)
- Argyropelecus affinis Garman, 1899 (Pacific hatchetfish)
- Argyropelecus gigas Norman, 1930 (giant hatchetfish, greater silver hatchetfish)
- Argyropelecus hemigymnus Cocco, 1829 (half-naked hatchetfish, short silver hatchetfish, spurred hatchetfish)
- Argyropelecus lychnus Garman, 1899 (tropical hatchetfish)
- Argyropelecus olfersii (G. Cuvier, 1829)
- Argyropelecus sladeni Regan, 1908 (Sladen's hatchetfish, silvery hatchetfish)

=== Fossil record ===
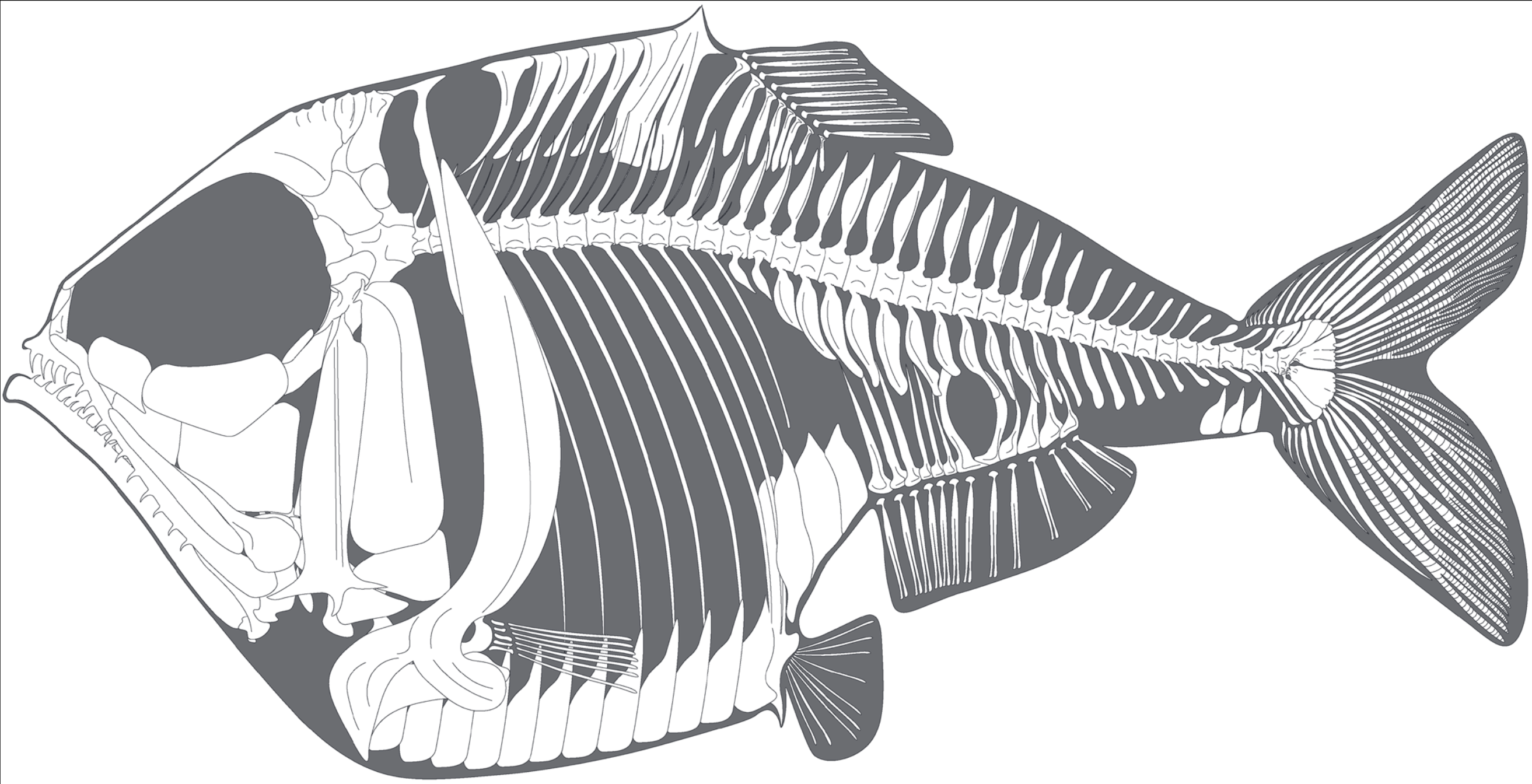
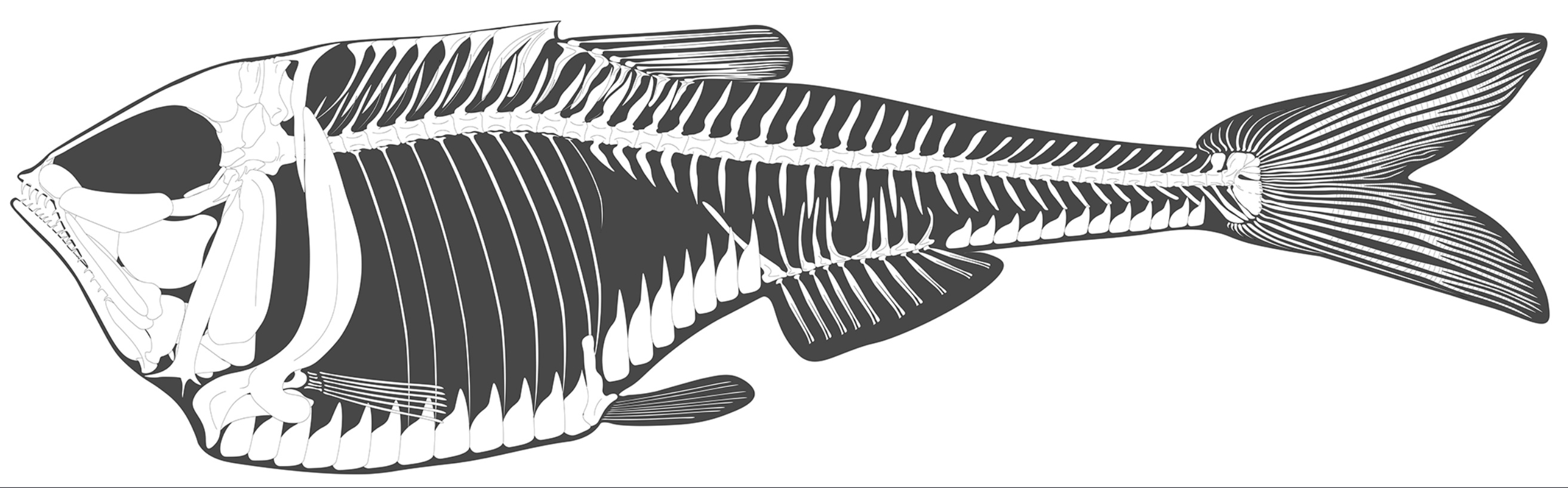
Skeletal diagrams of †A. iranicus (top) and †A. zagrosensis (bottom)

Extinct Argyropelecus species include:

- †Argyropelecus bullockii David, 1943 (Late Miocene of Monterey and Modelo Formations, California)
- †Argyropelecus iranicus Ridolfi et al., 2025 (Middle Eocene of Pabdeh Formation, Iran)
- †Argyropelecus logearti Arambourg, 1929 (Late Miocene of Algeria and Italy)
- †Argyropelecus priscus Cosmovici & Pauca, 1943 (Oligocene of the Czech Republic, Poland, Romania, and North Caucasus, Russia)
- †Argyropelecus zagrosensis Ridolfi et al., 2025 (Middle Eocene of Pabdeh Formation, Iran)

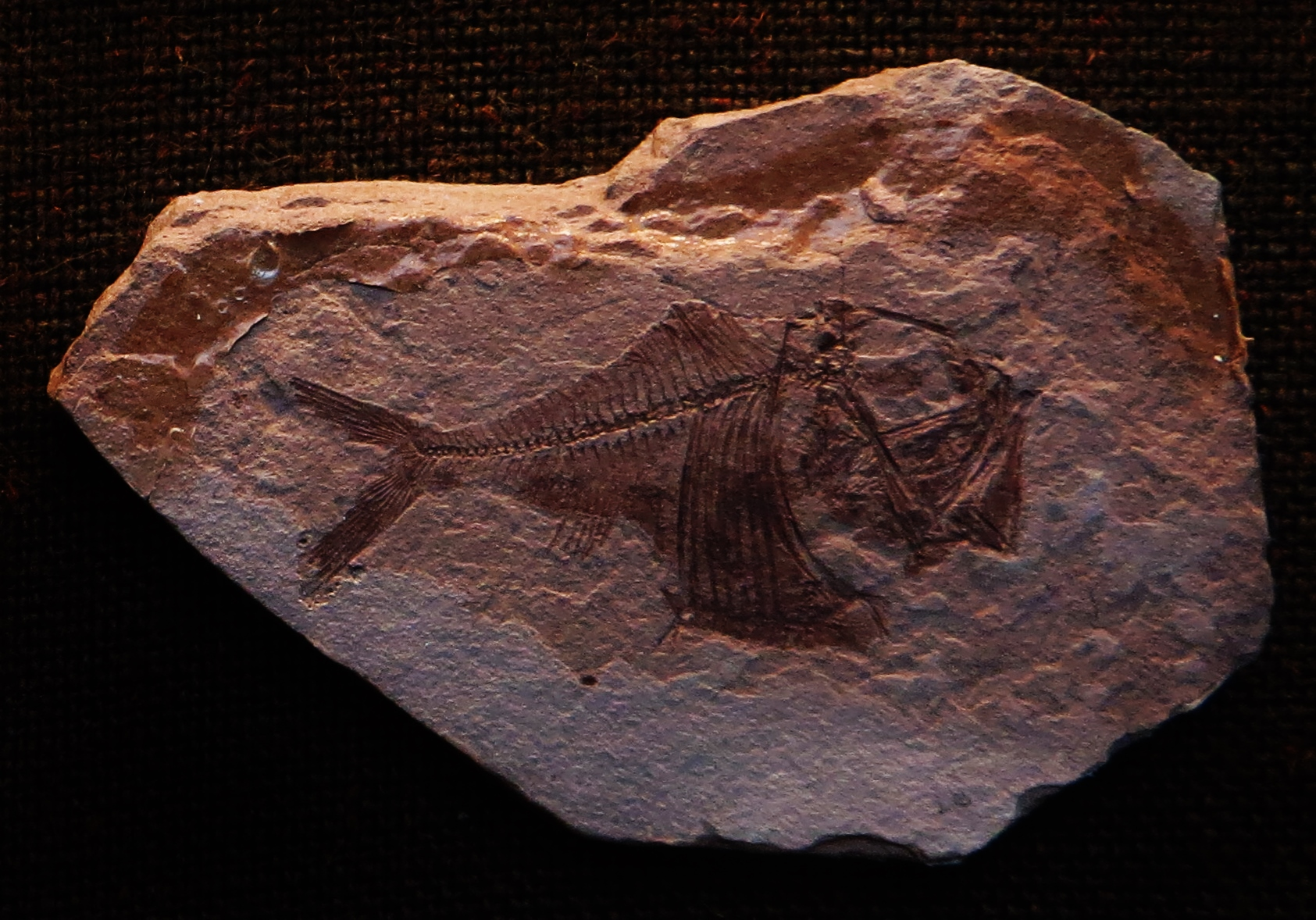
A. prisca, a fossil species from the Oligocene of Romania

The earliest unequivocal fossils of Argyropelecus date to the Bartonian stage of the Eocene. Previous to their discovery, the Eocene fossil record was restricted to otoliths from Austria, although their assignment to this genus is now questioned.
