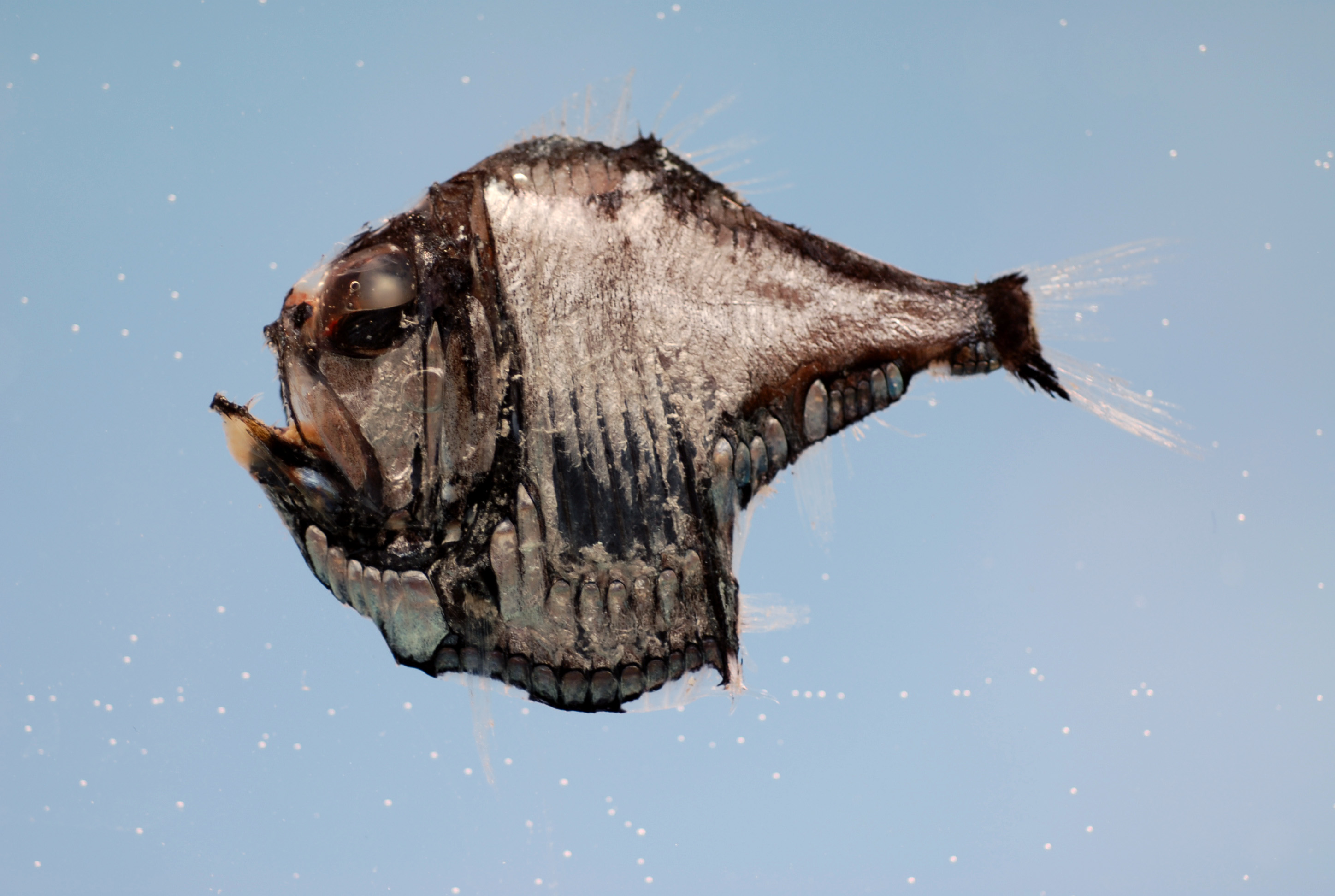

Conservation status
- Least Concern (IUCN 3.1)

Scientific classification
- Kingdom: Animalia
- Phylum: Chordata
- Class: Actinopterygii
- Order: Stomiiformes
- Family: Sternoptychidae
- Genus: Argyropelecus
- Species: A. aculeatus

Binomial name
- Argyropelecus aculeatus Valenciennes, 1850

= Argyropelecus aculeatus =

Argyropelecus aculeatus Temporal range: Pliocene to recent

Species of fish

Argyropelecus aculeatus, the lovely hatchetfish or Atlantic silver hatchetfish, is a species of fish in the family Sternoptychidae. It may exceed 70 millimetres (2.8 in) standard length (SL). It lives in the mesopelagic zone of all oceans and performs diel vertical migration. A. aculeatus feeds on a large range of prey items; in the Gulf of Mexico ostracods and copepods dominated the diet of small individuals (<30 mm SL) and euphausiids, molluscs, and fish the diet of larger ones. The silvery coloration and bioluminescence of the lovely hatchetfish allows it to hide from predators and prey in the down-welling light of the twilight zone.

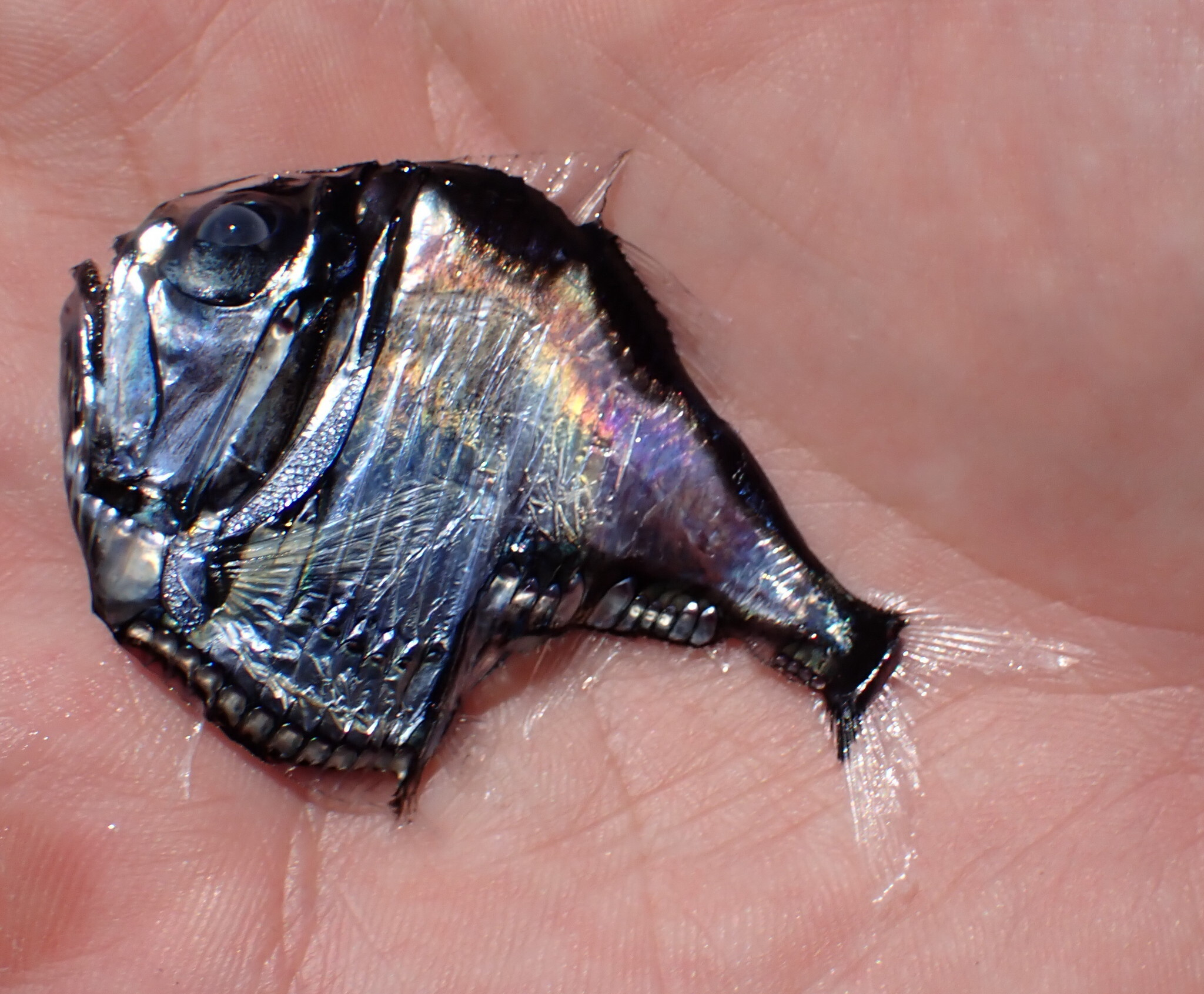
In Portugal
