= Albireonidae =

Albireonidae Temporal range: Messinian-Piacenzian, 7.246–2.588 Ma

Scientific classification
- Domain: Eukaryota
- Kingdom: Animalia
- Phylum: Chordata
- Class: Mammalia
- Order: Artiodactyla
- Infraorder: Cetacea
- Superfamily: Delphinoidea
- Family: †Albireonidae; Barnes, 1984

Genera
- †Albireo Barnes, 1984

Extinct family of dolphins

Albireonidae is a monotypic group of extinct porpoise-like whales containing the single genus Albireo. These medium-sized, fossil dolphins are very rare and known only from temperate latitudes around the margin of the eastern North Pacific Ocean.
