= Rhythmias =

Rhythmias Temporal range: Upper Miocene

Scientific classification
- Kingdom: Animalia
- Phylum: Chordata
- Class: Actinopterygii
- Order: Perciformes
- Genus: †Rhythmias; Jordan & Gilbert, 1920

Extinct genus of fishes

Rhythmias is an extinct genus of prehistoric bony fish that lived during the Upper Miocene subepoch.
