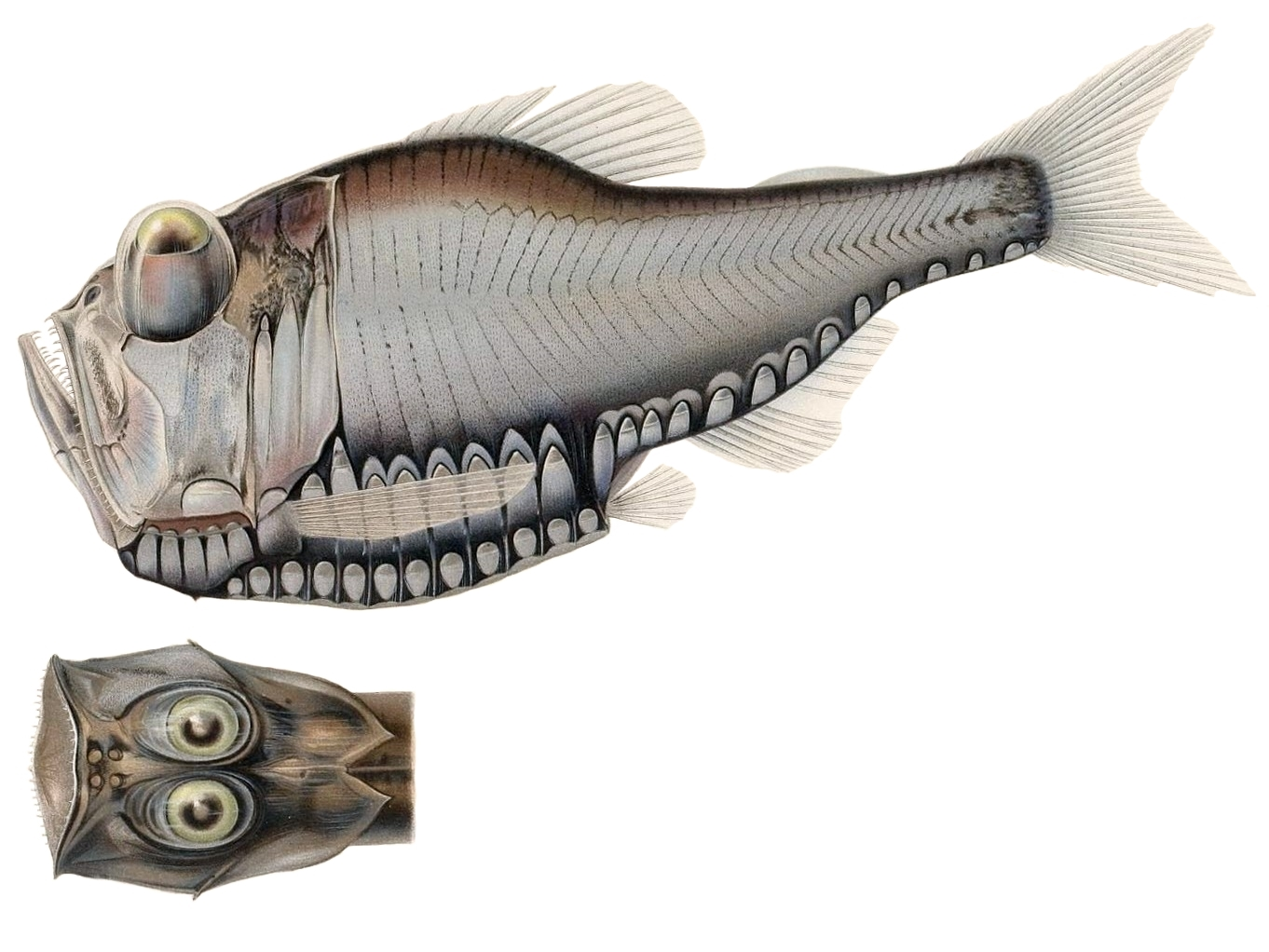

Conservation status
- Least Concern (IUCN 3.1)

Scientific classification
- Kingdom: Animalia
- Phylum: Chordata
- Class: Actinopterygii
- Division: Teleostei
- Order: Stomiiformes
- Family: Sternoptychidae
- Genus: Argyropelecus
- Species: A. affinis

Binomial name
- Argyropelecus affinis Garman, 1899

Synonyms
- Argyropelachus affinis Garman, 1899; Argyropelecus pacificus Schultz, 1961

= Argyropelecus affinis =

Species of fish

Argyropelecus affinis is a species of ray-finned fish in the family Sternoptychidae, described by Garman in 1899, found in the tropical and subtropical Atlantic, Indian and Pacific Oceans. Common names for this fish include Pacific hatchetfish, deepsea hatchetfish and slender hatchetfish. It inhabits the upper mesopelagic zone between 350 and 600m during the day, and between 100m and 350m during the night and is either non-migratory or performs short daily vertical migrations. They are distributed widely throughout all tropical and temperate seas. They are known for its laterally compressed body and characteristic photophores, which aid in bioluminescence. Argyropelecus affinis is closely related to Argyropelecus gigas.

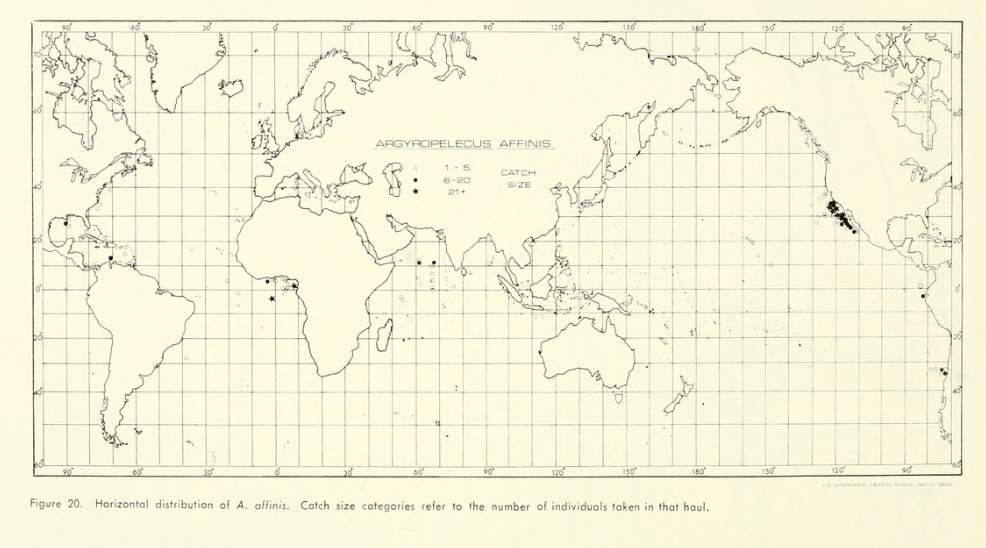
Figure 1. Horizontal Distribution of A. affinis (Baird 1971)

== Description ==
Argyropelecus affinis is a small laterally compressed fish with a standard length of up to 70 millimetres (2.8 in). It has a vertical mouth and tubular eyes that are directed upwards. There is a short spine in front of the operculum but no spine behind the eye. The dorsal fin has 9 short soft rays and there is also a dorsal adipose fin. The pectoral fin has 11 or 12 soft rays, the pelvic fin 6 and the anal fin 13. There are several short post-abdominal spines. The swim bladder is gas-filled and well-developed. This fish has a dark-coloured back and silvery sides, with darker pigment along the lateral line. The scales have a tendency to detach, and adult fish have rows of photophores on the underside.

== Taxonomy and classification ==
Argyropelecus affinis was first described by Samuel German in 1899. Its taxonomy has been relatively stable, though Schultz (1961) introduced A. pacificus based on variations in supination and morphological traits. This classification was later synonymized with A. affinis by Baird (1972), who recognized the variation as insufficient for distinguishing a separate species. Despite some historical confusion regarding its classification, modern revisions support the inclusion of A. pacificus as a junior synonym of A. affinis.

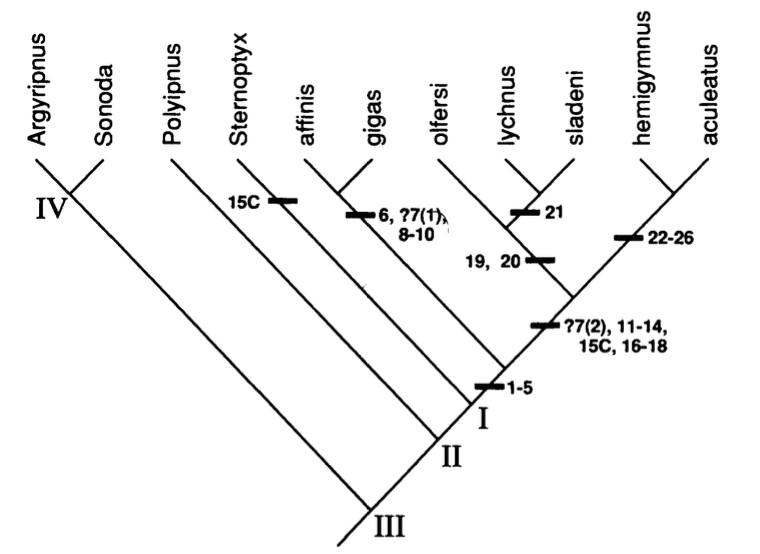
Figure 2. Cladogram depicting phylogenetic relationships among the seven recognized species of Argyropelecus and four outgroups (Harold 1993)

== Phylogeny ==
In phylogenetic studies, Argyropelecus affinis is placed within the affinis species complex, along with A. gigas. This complex is considered the sister group to the remaining species of the genus Argyropelecus. The analysis of morphological traits suggests that A. affinis and A. gigas retain some primitive features relative to other members of the genus, placing them as a basal in the phylogeny of Argyropelecus. Derived characteristics present in other Argyropelecus species are absent in A. affinis, supporting its placement in a separate, more primitive clade.

== Morphology ==
Argyropelecus affinis displays a number of distinctive morphological traits including:

- A partially ossified ventral limb of the supracleithrum (major bone of pectoral girdle) and posttemporal bone
- A broad angle (approximately 60°) between the ischial and pubic processes of the pelvic girdle, a unique characteristic in comparison to other species within the genus
- The presence of broad gaps between the posterior photophores, distinguishing it from the other members of the genus where these photophores are more closely packed
- Photophores refers to light producing organs in fish that shines light through a chemical reaction

Additionally, A. affinis possesses some unique traits, such as an acute spine-like angle on the anterodorsal surface of the ventral section of the cleithrum and specific pitting patterns on the cleithrum's surfaces.

== Distribution and habitat ==
Argyropelecus affinis lives in deep-sea environments, typically found in midwater oceanic regions. This species is circum-global and is found in the warmer parts of the Atlantic, Indian and Pacific Oceans. It is plentiful off the coast of West Africa from about 10°S northwards, and is present as far south as 15°S near Madagascar. It is usually found in the mesopelagic zone. During the day, trawls at depths between 350 and 600 m (1,100 and 2,000 ft) produce the highest catches and at night the greatest abundance of fish is in the depth range 170 and 400 m (600 and 1,300 ft); this indicates that some, but not necessarily all, fish make short daily vertical migrations. As with other members of the genus, it has photophores along its body, which are used for counter-illumination, a form of camouflage against predators in the deep sea.

== Evolutionary significance ==
The placement of A. affinis and A. gigas as a distinct clade within the genus Argyropelecus is supported by five derived traits, though some aspects of their evolutionary relationships remain ambiguous. Baird's (1972) assessment suggested that A. affinis was one of the more primitive members of the genus, a hypothesis that has been further refined in subsequent phylogenetic studies. The genus's evolution is characterized by changes in the structure of the pelvic girdle, photophore arrangement, and ossification patterns. Here, ossification pattern refers to the pattern that the bones form in the body of a fish. This is important because it shows the evolution, growth, and development of the fish.

== Relationship with other species ==
Argyropelecus affinis is part of the broader affinis species complex, which is distinct from the lychnus complex, comprising species such as A. lychnus, A. aculeatus, A. olfersi, and A. sladeni. The lychnus complex is considered more derived and is characterized by modifications such as reduced number of hypurals and distinct photophore arrangements. In contrast, A. affinis retains traits like three hypurals in the lower caudal lobe and a continuous series of posterior ventral photophores, suggesting a closer resemblance to ancestral forms within the genus.

== Diet ==
Argyropelecus affinis diet is composed of unidentified Teleostei (32% weight percentage), Teleostei larvae (24% weight percentage), Gonostomatidae (13% weight percentage), and Euphausia spp. (9% weight percentage).

== Structure of the eye ==
The eyes of Argyropelecus affinis are large, and oriented dorsally. They are tubular or telescopic which are one of the specific characteristics of oceanic deepsea fishes. The larger vertical (ventro-dorsal) diameter of the tubular eye constitutes 10 to 15% of the fish's standard length. Lens and pupil are very large, but the lens muscle is much reduced compared with that of shallow water fishes. The retina of the eye consists of the main and the accessory retinas. The visual cells of retina are composed of rods, and no cones.

== Main retina and accessory retina ==
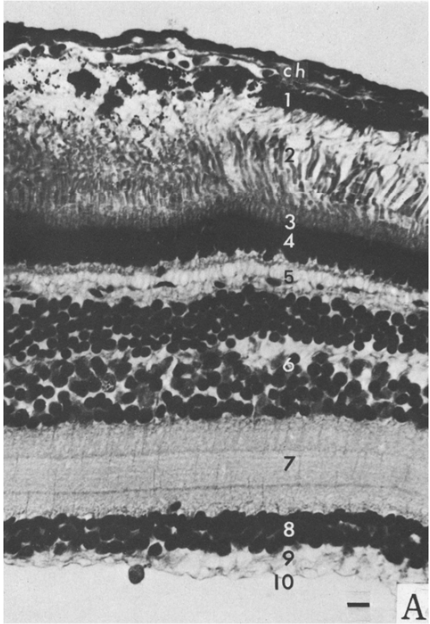
Figure 3. Main Retina of A. affinis

The main retina (Figure 3) forms the ventral and temporal walls of the retinal eye cup. Histologically, the retina is composed of 10-layer elements as seen in the retina of shallow water fishes. The greatest thickness of the retina, about 200 micrometer, occurs ventrally, where rod's outer segment is long (about 50 micrometer).

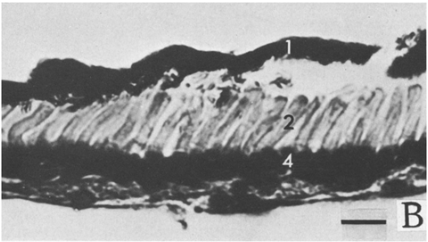
Figure 4. Accessory Retina of A. affinis

The position of the accessory retina is shown in Figure 4. The outer segments of these rods are short (15 micrometers). Pigment epithelium, visual cells and outer nuclear layer were identified, but the other layers could not be distinguished.

== Eye pigmentation ==
Eye lens pigmentation in the deep-sea hatchetfish is characterized by 1) an abrupt onset and steady increase in concentration during the life history of the fish; 2) restriction to the outer layers of the lenses of adult fishes; 3) a complex absorption profile in the near UV and blue-violet wavelengths; and 4) a chromophore that is tightly bound to a single, specific soluble lens protein, alpha crystallin. No other visual systems with lens pigmentation yet described have these four characteristics. The distribution of pigment within the A. affinis lens suggests that, beginning at a specific age, the pigment is incorporated into new lens fiber cells as they are laid down over preexisting cells.

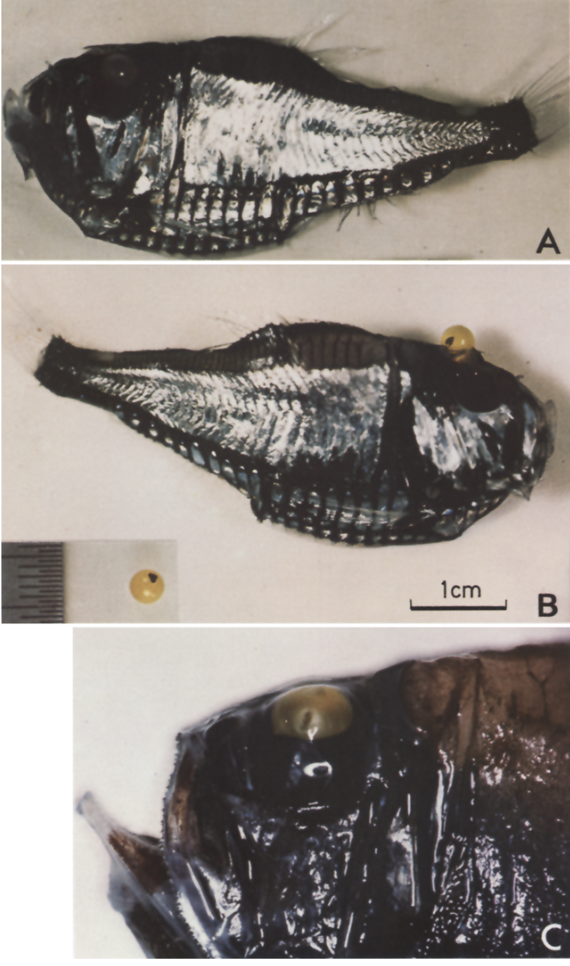
Figure 5. Yellow Lens of Argyropelecus affinis

== Ecology ==
Adult Argyropelecus affinis feed on planktonic organisms, salps, krill, arrow worms, copepods and ostracods. Smaller fish consume mainly copepods and ostracods, and their adult arrangement of photophores develop when they are about 14 mm (0.6 in) long.

The lenses of the eyes of A. affinis contains yellow pigments that absorb short-wave radiation; the proportions of the two carotenoid-like pigments present change as the fish grows older. It is not clear what precise function is served by the pigments, but with some of the incident illumination being absorbed, the fish's absolute sensitivity to light must be reduced.

== Conservation ==
Argyropelecus affinis is a common fish and is abundant in many parts of its wide range. No specific threats have been identified especially to humans and the International Union for Conservation of Nature has rated its conservation status as being of "least concern".
