= Protanthias =

Protanthias Temporal range: Upper Miocene

Scientific classification
- Domain: Eukaryota
- Kingdom: Animalia
- Phylum: Chordata
- Class: Actinopterygii
- Order: Perciformes
- Family: Serranidae
- Genus: †Protanthias

Extinct genus of fishes

Protanthias is an extinct genus of prehistoric bony fish that lived during the Upper Miocene subepoch.

== See also ==
- Prehistoric fish
- List of prehistoric bony fish
