= Polyipnoides =

Polyipnoides Temporal range: Middle Eocene

Scientific classification
- Domain: Eukaryota
- Kingdom: Animalia
- Phylum: Chordata
- Class: Actinopterygii
- Genus: †Polyipnoides; Danilt'chenko, 1962

Extinct genus of fishes

Polyipnoides is an extinct genus of prehistoric bony fish that lived during the middle division of the Eocene epoch.

== See also ==
- Prehistoric fish
- List of prehistoric bony fish
