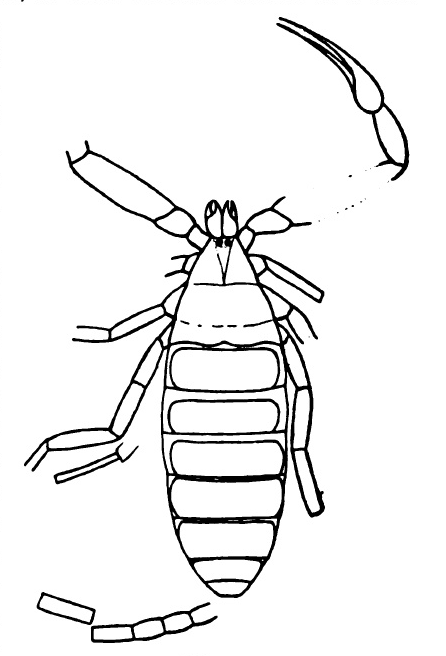
- An image of the partial remains of an Eoscorpius specimen, created by Alexander Petrunkevitch

Scientific classification
- Kingdom: Animalia
- Phylum: Arthropoda
- Subphylum: Chelicerata
- Class: Arachnida
- Order: Scorpiones
- Family: †Eoscorpiidae
- Genus: †Eoscorpius; Meek and Worthen 1868

Type species
- †Eoscorpius carbonarius Meek and Worthen 1868

Synonyms
- Trigonoscorpio Petrunkevitch 1913; Typhlopisthacanthus Petrunkevitch 1949; Typhloscorpius Petrunkevitch 1949; Lichnophthalmus Petrunkevitch 1949; Alloscorpius Petrunkevitch 1949; Europhthalmus Petrunkevitch 1949

= Eoscorpius =

Eoscorpius Temporal range: Early Carboniferous – Asselian

Extinct genus of scorpions

Eoscorpius is an extinct genus of scorpions. Several species have been formally described and named, while several other proposed species lack formal scientific names. The genus existed from the Early Carboniferous to the Asselian age of the Early Permian, its distribution spanning modern-day Asia, North America, and Europe. Its defining features include the subquadrate shape of its carapace, the placement of its median eyes on raised nodes, and two large ridges that differentiate the parts of its carapace. It has been noted for its extensive similarities to modern scorpions. Its habitat is believed to have included the extensive swampy, coal-producing forests that existed during the Carboniferous. Within these forests, there is evidence that it may have lived in the canopy and understory levels.

== History of discovery ==
The type specimen of the genus Eoscorpius was first described in 1868 by the American paleontologists Fielding Bradford Meek and Amos Henry Worthen. It was tentatively identified as a member of the genus Buthus as Buthus carbonarius, although Meek and Worthen expressed doubt that it truly belonged to the genus. In the event that it indeed did not, they proposed the alternative name Eoscorpius (with Eoscorpius carbonarius as the type species), in reference to its early origin. The British geologist Ben Peach expressed regret that the name, meaning "dawn-scorpion", was given to a genus so similar to modern scorpions, speculating a much earlier origin for scorpions as a group.

The World Spider Catalog lists seven named species of Eoscorpius as of January 2020. Additional species have been proposed from China and France, but they have not been formally named. Another unnamed species found in France was initially designated as belonging to the genus Lichnophthalmus, which has since been synonymized with Eoscorpius. The named species are as follows:

- Eoscorpius bornaensis Sterzel, 1918
- Eoscorpius carbonarius Meek and Worthen, 1868
- Eoscorpius casei Kjellesvig-Waering, 1986
- Eoscorpius distinctus (Petrunkevitch, 1949)
- Eoscorpius mucronatus Kjellesvig-Waering, 1986
- Eoscorpius pulcher (Petrunkevitch, 1949)
- Eoscorpius sparthensis Baldwin and Sutcliffe, 1904

The species E. distinctus and E. pulcher were both originally placed in different genera — Typhloscorpius and Lichnophthalmus, respectively — by the Russian arachnologist Alexander Petrunkevitch in 1949. These two were among several additional Eoscorpiidae genera described by Petrunkevitch during the first half of the 20th century, but later papers in 1986 and 2013 synonymized all with Eoscorpius.

== Description ==
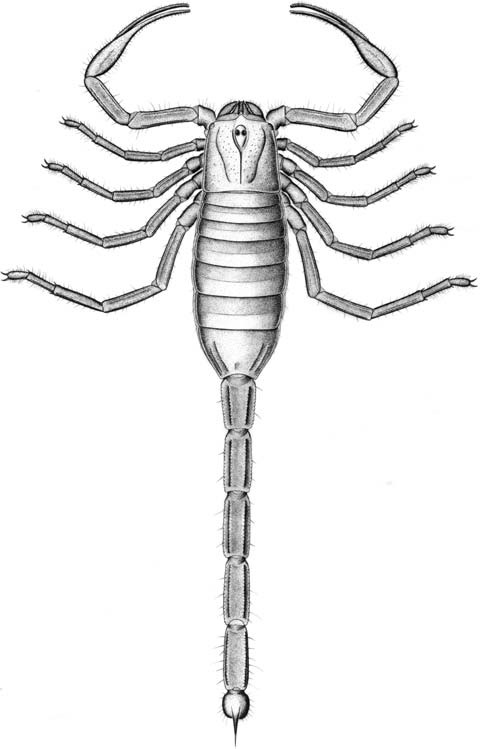
Reconstruction of Eoscorpius carbonarius, based on a specimen believed to have measured 11 centimetres (4.3 in)

The type specimen of Eoscorpius described by Meek and Worthen (of the species Eoscorpius carbonarius) was noted for its rather poor condition, consisting of incomplete parts of the mandibles, cephalothorax, abdomen, and tail. Four of the legs on one side were preserved, along with one of the "peculiar comb-like organs" typical of scorpions. The cephalothorax was described as sub-quadrangular, slightly wider than long; its length and width were recorded as about 0.45 inches (1.1 cm). The abdomen was recorded as about 0.9 inches (2.3 cm) long and 0.6 inches (1.5 cm) wide. The mandibles were noted for their similarity to those of other scorpions, as well as their lack of distinct "teeth". The legs were recorded as long and stout. Neither the legs nor the rest of the body appeared to possess hairs, serrations, or spines. Meek and Worthen observed that the specimen was unlike Cyclophthalmus, the only other Carboniferous scorpion known at the time, insofar as its tail was completely distinct from its abdomen, rather than gradually transitioning. They stated that based on the known material, the specimen's features seemed to match those of modern scorpions exactly. The paleontologist Erik N. Kjellesvig-Waering remarked in 1986 that Meek and Worthen's description was "exceptionally good" for its time. By then, several other specimens of the species were known, believed to represent both males and females. Based on remains consisting of a single chela (claw) of a pedipalp, Kjellesvig-Waering estimated that one specimen of E. carbonarius exceeded 30 centimetres (12 in) in length from the front end of its carapace to the end of its tail.

In his writing, Kjellesvig-Waering provided a thorough reanalysis of the genus Eoscorpius, creating a new definition for the genus itself (as well as the species E. carbonarius) and writing new descriptions for E. distinctus , E. pulcher, and E. sparthensis. He also named the species E. casei and E. mucronatus, although he only provided a description for the latter. He stated that the defining features of the genus Eoscorpius are its subquadrate carapace, the placement of its median eyes on elevated teardrop-shaped nodes near the outer margin, and its two large raised cephalic ridges that differentiate the cephalic and thoracic areas of its carpace. Another feature he described as being indicative of the genus is the presence of rows of ornamental setae (small hairs) on the free finger (mobile part) of the pedipalp.

== Classification ==
Eoscorpius was placed in the newly erected family Eoscorpionidae by the American paleontologist Samuel Hubbard Scudder in 1884. While other experts of the time, such as Ben Peach, considered the genus to be hardly different from modern scorpions, Scudder believed that it was sufficiently distinct to warrant the creation of a new family. The family name was corrected to Eoscorpiidae by later authors. In 1882, German entomologist Ferdinand Karsch proposed that known Carboniferous and Silurian scorpion species could be divided between four genera: Eoscorpius, Microlabis, Cyclophthalmus, and Mazonia. Later papers by German entomologist Erich Haase and Czech paleontologist Antonín Frič (from 1890 and 1904, respectively) did not fully agree Karsch's classification scheme, but both maintained the validity of Eoscorpius as a taxon. However, its validity was later disputed by British zoologist Reginald Innes Pocock in his 1911 book A monograph of the terrestrial Carboniferous Arachnida of Great Britain, which proposed that the species formerly assigned to Eoscorpius belonged in other genera, namely Cyclophthalmus, Archaeoctonus, and Anthracoscorpio. Nonetheless, Petrunkevitch reaffirmed the genus's validity in his own taxonomic assessment of Carboniferous arachnids in 1913. John Irwin Moore, a graduate student of the Department of Geology at the University of Chicago, wrote favorably of Petrunkevitch's classification scheme in his 1923 master's dissertation, noting that it took into account both fossil evidence and comparative anatomy based on more recent organisms.

== Paleoecology ==
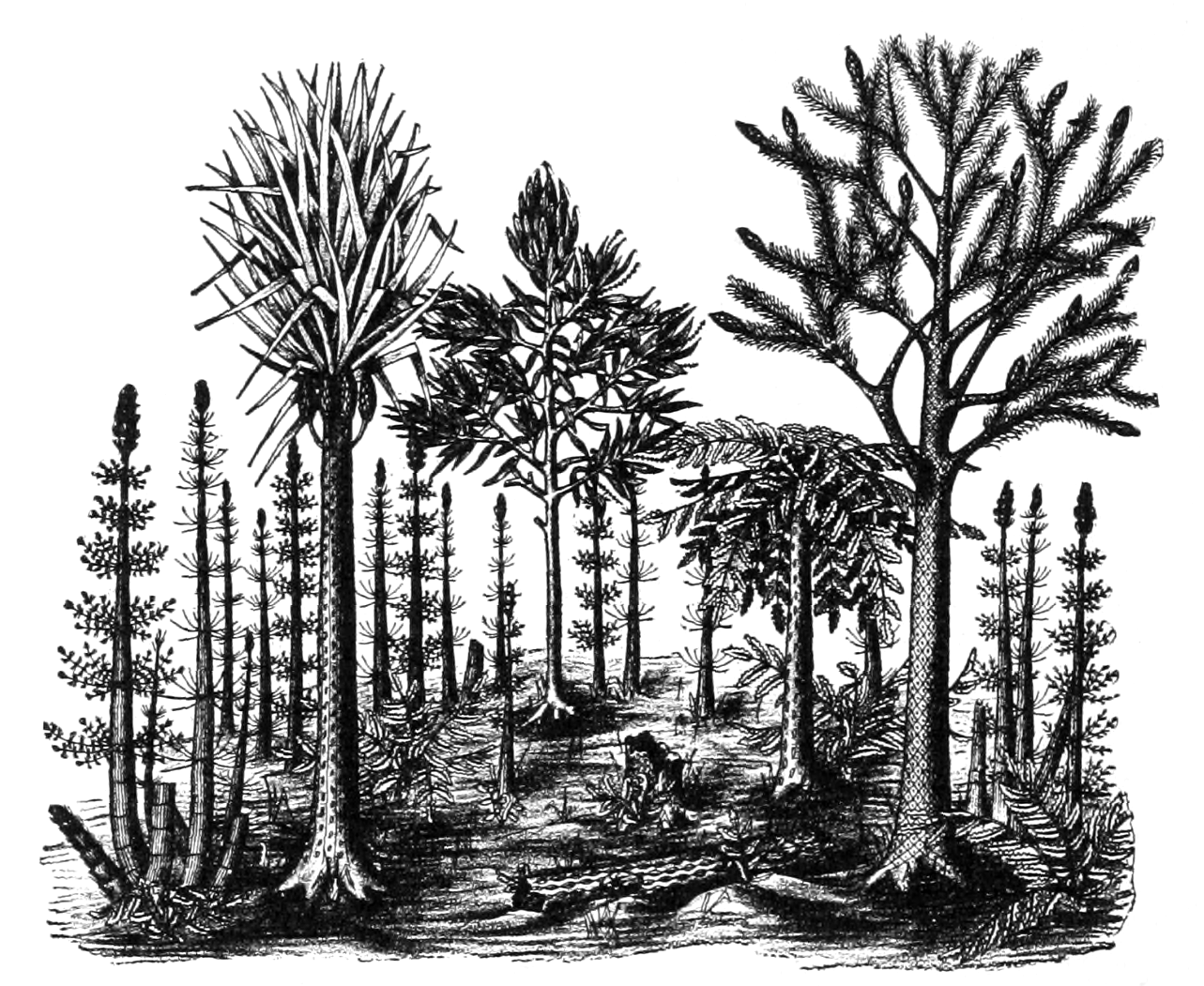
An illustration of a Carboniferous forest

Fossils of Eoscorpius have been found in Canada, China, France, Germany, the United Kingdom, and the United States. The genus lived from the Early Carboniferous to the Asselian age of the Early Permian. The species E. carbonarius, E. casei, E. distinctus, E. pulcher, E. sparthensis, and two unnamed French species are all known from the Upper Carboniferous, also referred to as the Pennsylvanian. The species E. bornaensis, noted in one paper for being overlooked in major analyses such as Kjellesvig-Waering's, was Early Carboniferous in age. An unnamed Chinese species, first described in 2020, is from the Asselian, representing the second Paleozoic scorpion found in China and the third Permian scorpion found anywhere in the world.

The type specimen was recovered from the Mazon Creek fossil beds in Illinois, US. These fossil beds have been noted since the 1840s for their exceptional preservation of a variety of plants and animals. During the Carboniferous, the continents were united to form Pangea, with the Mazon Creek area located near the equator. Historically, the Mazon Creek fossils have been thought to represent two separate biota, one marine and one partially freshwater and partially terrestrial. However, some authors have suggested that the entire area was a brackish bay, diluted by the freshwater outflow of nearby rivers, with the terrestrial organisms having been washed out from upstream environments. The geologic unit from which fossils are best known in the area, the Francis Creek shale, was deposited as the Earth transitioned from a glacial to an interglacial interval. This type of transition would be associated with rising sea-levels (causing lowland swamps to flood) and a drying climate.

The species E. distinctus, E. mucronatus, E. pulcher, and E. sparthensis are known from the coal measures of England, all of which lived during the Pennsylvanian. During this time, England was located within a belt of swampy forest that stretched across Euramerica, covering around 1,200,000 square kilometres (460,000 sq mi) at its greatest extent. The plants that comprised these forests included lycophytes, a group whose modern members are the small clubmosses but whose Pennsylvanian counterparts grew to tree-size; large relatives of modern-day sphenophytes (horsetails); ferns, some small and herbaceous, others consisting of upright trunks crowned with fronds at their tops; and pteridosperms, an informal grouping of seed-bearing plants with frondlike features. These forests produced large quantities of peat, which later developed into coal. All English coal-bearing Paleozoic strata originate from the Pennsylvanian.

The late-surviving Eoscorpius species discovered in China, specifically from the Taiyuan Formation of Inner Mongolia, would have lived in a coal swamp dominated by Cordaites, a genus of tree, accompanied by the plants Pterophyllum and Sphenophyllum oblongifolium, the latter of which would have provided groundcover. The fossil specimen discovered is believed to represent a molt rather than the remains of an entire dead animal. The layers in which the specimen was found are believed to comprise the ancient forest's canopy and understory. Although animal fossils are scarce compared to those of plants in the beds from which the specimen was uncovered, the scientists who described it stated that its diet was likely predatory, consisting of small herbivores. They wrote that these herbivores would have "certainly" existed in such an environment, a claim supported by insect-mediated damage observed on plant fossils.

== See also ==
- Carboniferous rainforest collapse
