= Tunita =

Tunita Temporal range: Upper Miocene

Scientific classification
- Kingdom: Animalia
- Phylum: Chordata
- Class: Actinopterygii
- Order: Scombriformes
- Family: Scombridae
- Genus: †Tunita; Jordan and Gilbert, 1919

Type species
- Tunita octavia Jordan and Gilbert, 1919

Species
- T. octavia; T. sp

Extinct genus of fishes

Tunita is an extinct genus of prehistoric mackerel that lived during the Upper Miocene subepoch of Southern California.

== See also ==
- Prehistoric fish
- List of prehistoric bony fish
