= List of the prehistoric life of California =

This list of the prehistoric life of California contains the various prehistoric life-forms whose fossilized remains have been reported from within the US state of California.

== Precambrian ==
The Paleobiology Database records no known occurrences of Precambrian fossils in California.

== Paleozoic ==
=== Selected Paleozoic taxa of California ===
- †Advenella
- †Agathiceras
- †Ampyx – tentative report
- †Ampyx
- †Apatolichas
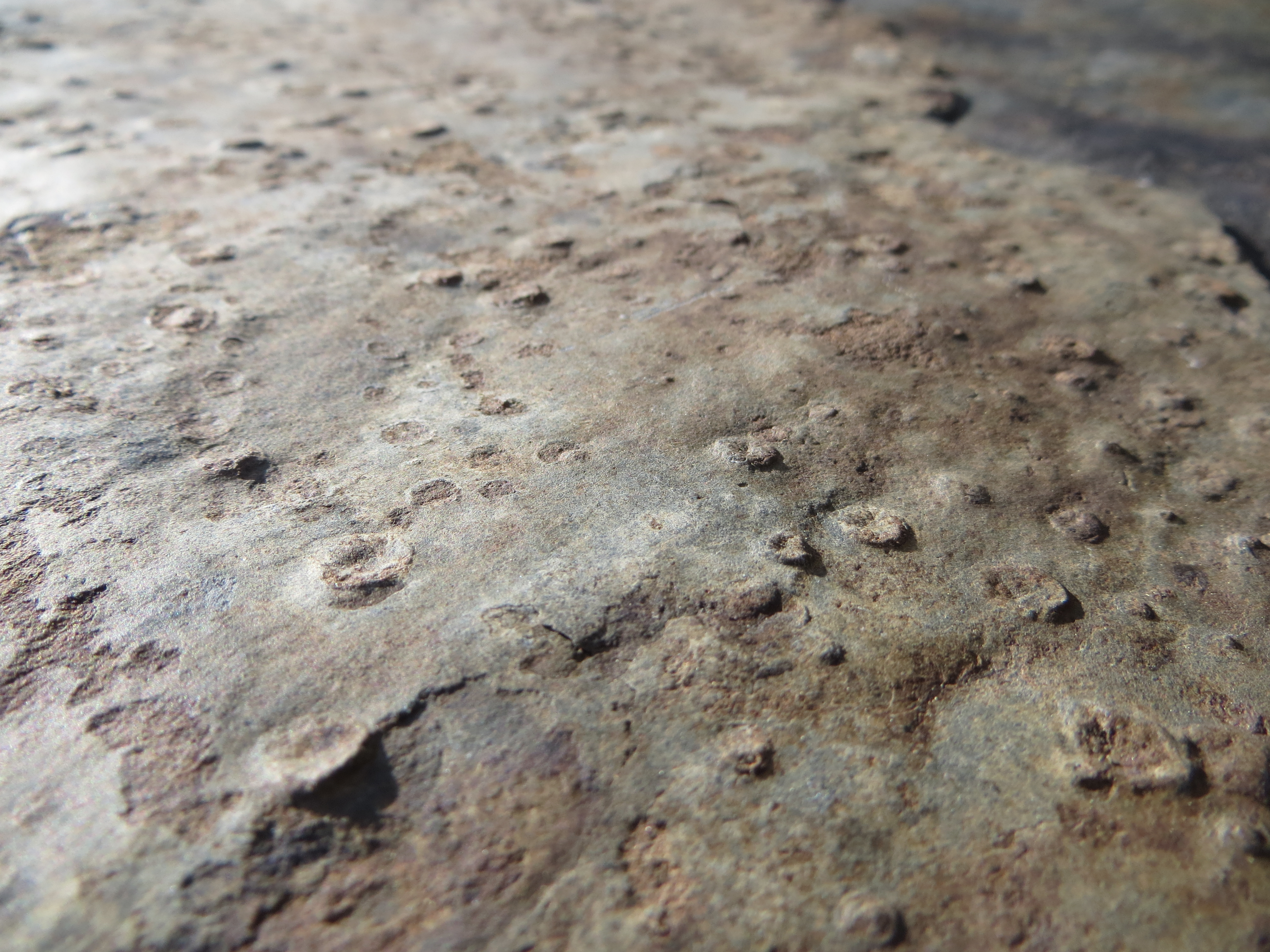
- Fossils of the mysterious Ediacaran organism Aspidella
  †Aspidella – tentative report
  - †Aspidella terranovica
- †Atrypa
  - †Atrypa reticularis
- †Aviculopecten
  - †Aviculopecten occidentalis – or unidentified comparable form
- †Bimuria
- †Bolbolenellus
- †Bristolia
- †Bumastus
- †Calymene
- †Camarotoechia – tentative report
- †Carolinites
- †Chonetes
- †Cleiothyridina
- †Composita
  - †Composita grandis – or unidentified comparable form
  - †Composita subtilita – or unidentified comparable form
- †Conchidium
- †Conocardium
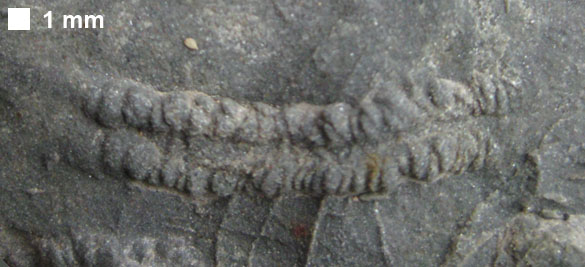
- Fossil of the Devonian-Triassic arthropod trackway ichnogenus Cruziana
  †Cruziana
- †Cyclolobus
- †Cyclonema
- †Cymbidium
- †Daguinaspis
- †Dicoelosia
- †Didymograptus
- †Dimeropygiella
- †Diplichnites
- †Encrinurus
- †Endoceras – tentative report
- †Euomphalus
- †Fallotaspis
- †Favosites
- †Fenestella
- †Gogia
- †Halysites
- †Helicoplacus
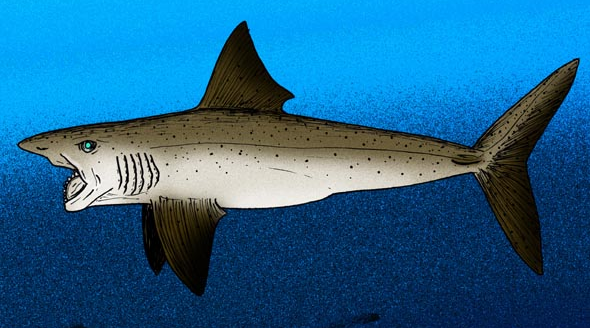
- Life restoration of the Permian Chimaera relative Helicoprion
  †Helicoprion
  - †Helicoprion davisii
- †Heliomeroides
- †Hercynella
- †Holopea
- †Hyolithes
- †Illaenus
- †Ingria
- †Isogramma
- †Isotelus
- †Kawina
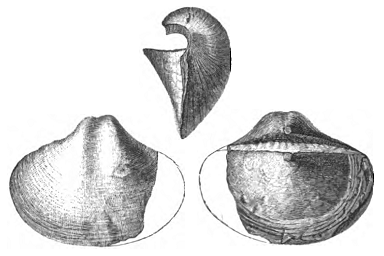
- Illustration of a fossilized shell of the brachiopod Kutorgina
  †Kutorgina
- †Lingula
- †Lingulella
- †Lithostrotion
  - †Lithostrotion pauciradiale
- †Lonchodomas
- †Meristella
- †Micromitra
- †Murchisonia
- †Neospirifer
- †Nephrolenellus
- †Nevadella
- †Obolella
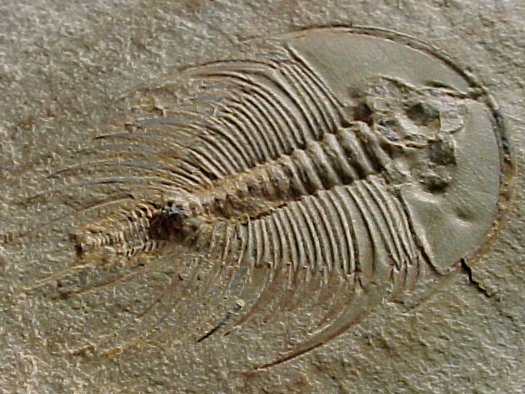
- Illustration of a fossil of the Cambrian trilobite Olenellus
  †Olenellus
  - †Olenellus fowleri – or unidentified comparable form
- †Oryctocephalus
  - †Oryctocephalus indicus
- †Paladin
- Palaeoaplysina
- †Paleochiton
- †Parafusulina
- †Paraschwagerina
- †Peachella
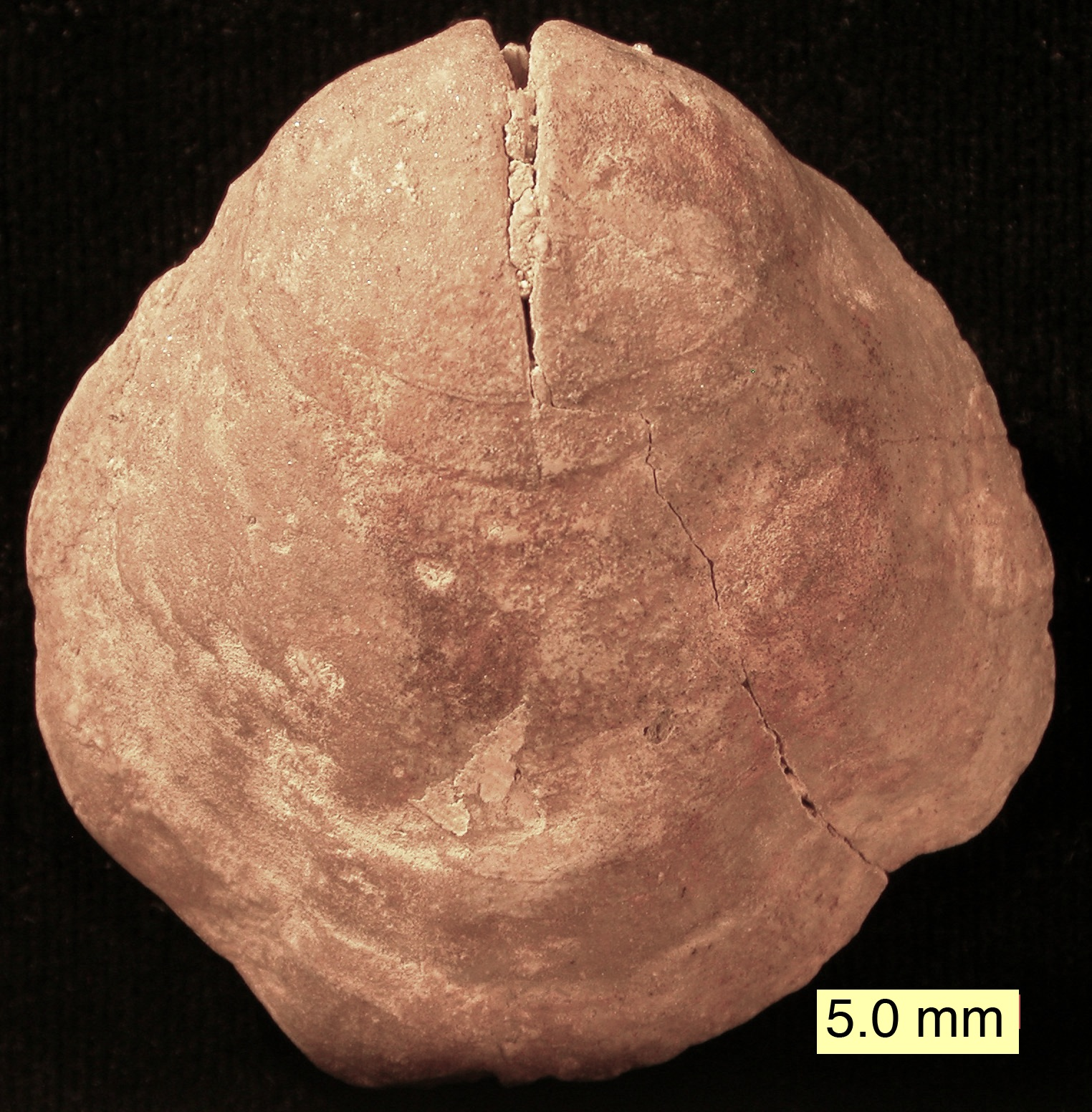
- Fossilized shell of the Silurian-Middle Devonian brachiopod Pentamerus
  †Pentamerus
- †Phillipsia
- †Phyllograptus
- †Plaesiomys
- †Planolites
- †Platyceras
- †Poleumita
- †Proetus
- †Pteridinium – tentative report
- †Raymondaspis
- †Remopleurides
- †Repinaella
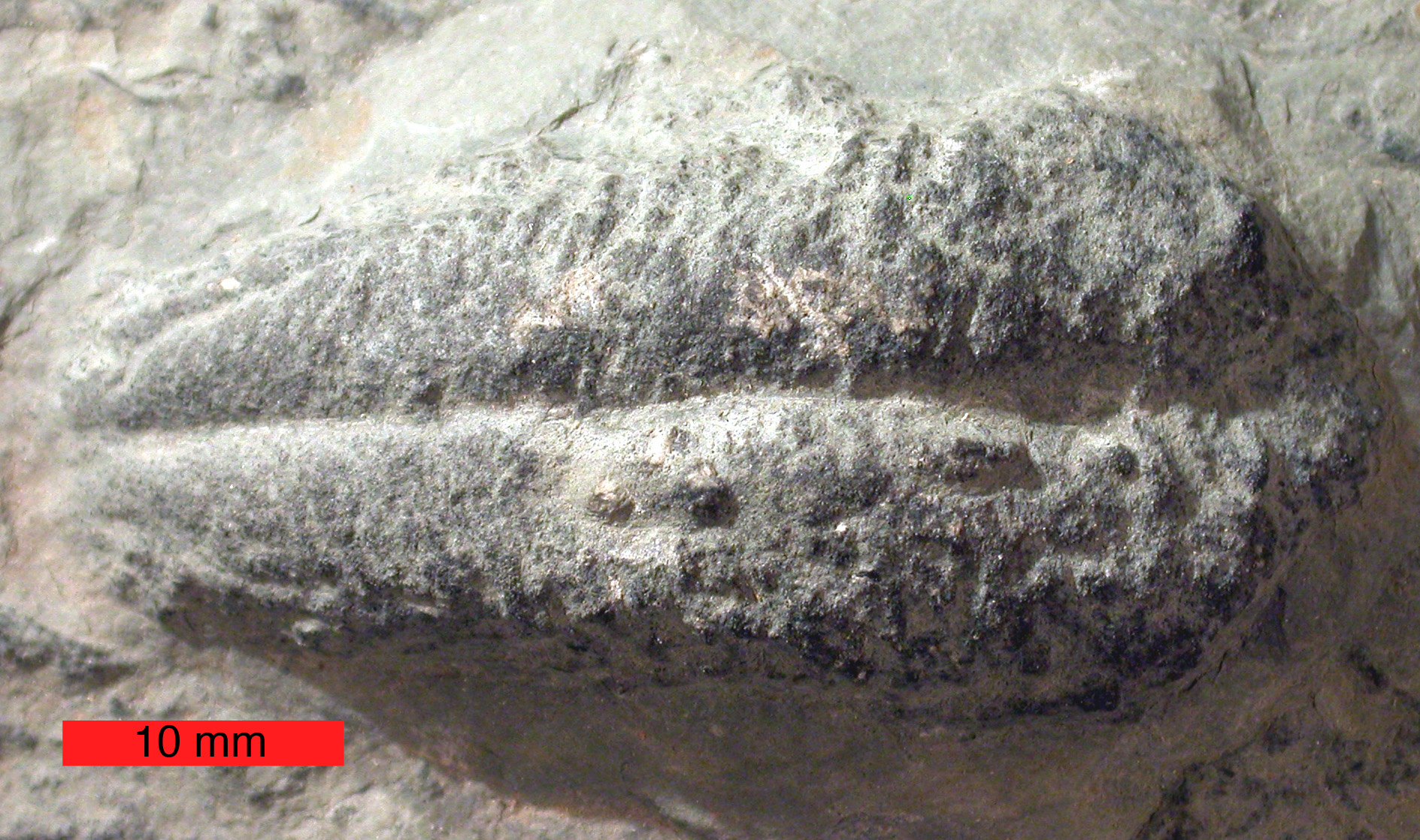
- Fossil of the arthropod burrow ichnogenus Rusophycus
  †Rusophycus
- †Schwagerina
- †Skenidioides
- †Spirifer
  - †Spirifer brazerianus
- †Spiriferina – tentative report
- †Stearoceras
- †Streptosolen
- †Stylonema
- †Swartpuntia – or unidentified comparable form
- †Syringopora
- †Thompsonella
- †Trinodus
- †Trocholites – tentative report
- †Volborthella
- †Wanneria
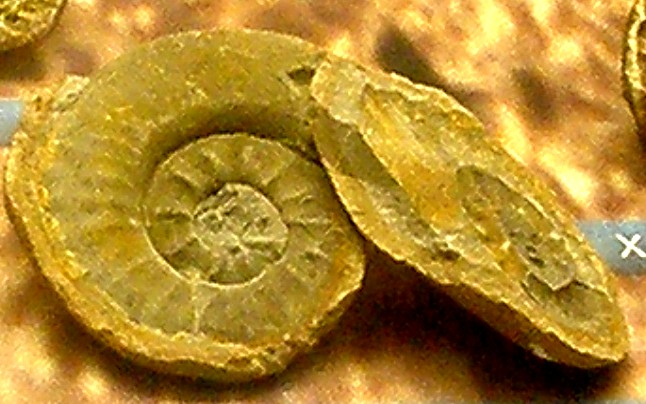
- Fossilized shells of the ammonoid cephalopod Xenodiscus
  †Xenodiscus
- †Zacanthoides

== Mesozoic ==
=== Selected Mesozoic taxa of California ===
- †Abyssochrysos – tentative report
- †Acanthoceras
- Acanthosphaera – tentative report
- Acesta
- †Acrioceras
- †Acrodus
  - †Acrodus wempliae – type locality for species
- †Acteon
- †Acteonella
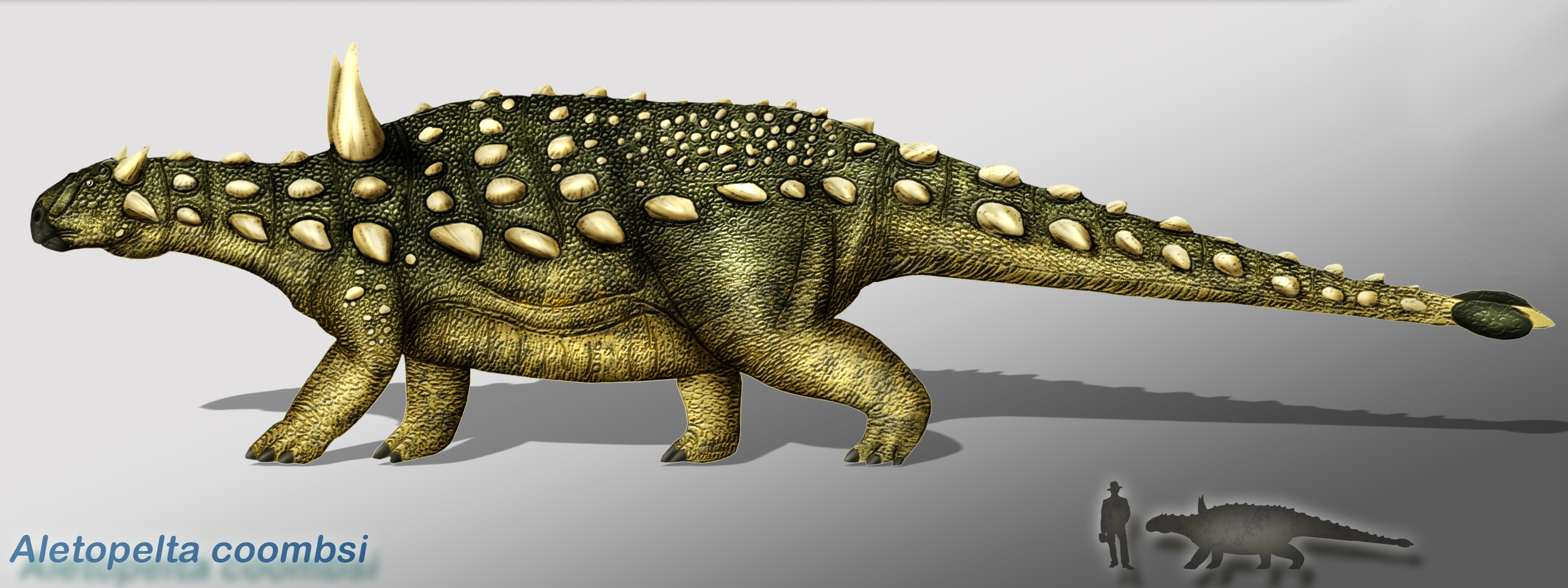
- Life restoration of the Late Cretaceous armored dinosaur Aletopelta
  †Aletopelta – type locality for genus
  - †Aletopelta coombsi – type locality for species
- Amauropsis
- †Ampullina
- †Anagaudryceras
  - †Anagaudryceras sacya – or unidentified comparable form
- †Anahamulina
- †Anasibirites
  - †Anasibirites kingianus – type locality for species
- †Anatomites
- †Anatropites
- †Anisoceras
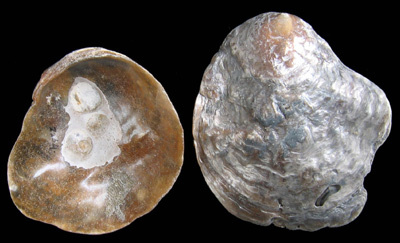
- Interior and exterior of a shell of an Anomia, or jingle shell
  †Anomia
- †Anoplophora – tentative report
- †Aphaea
- †Aphrosaurus
  - †Aphrosaurus furlongi
- Aporrhais
- Architectonica – tentative report
- Arctica
- †Arctoceras
- Argyrotheca
- †Arnioceras
- †Arpadites
- Arrhoges
- †Aspenites – type locality for genus
- Astarte
- †Asteroceras
- †Atira
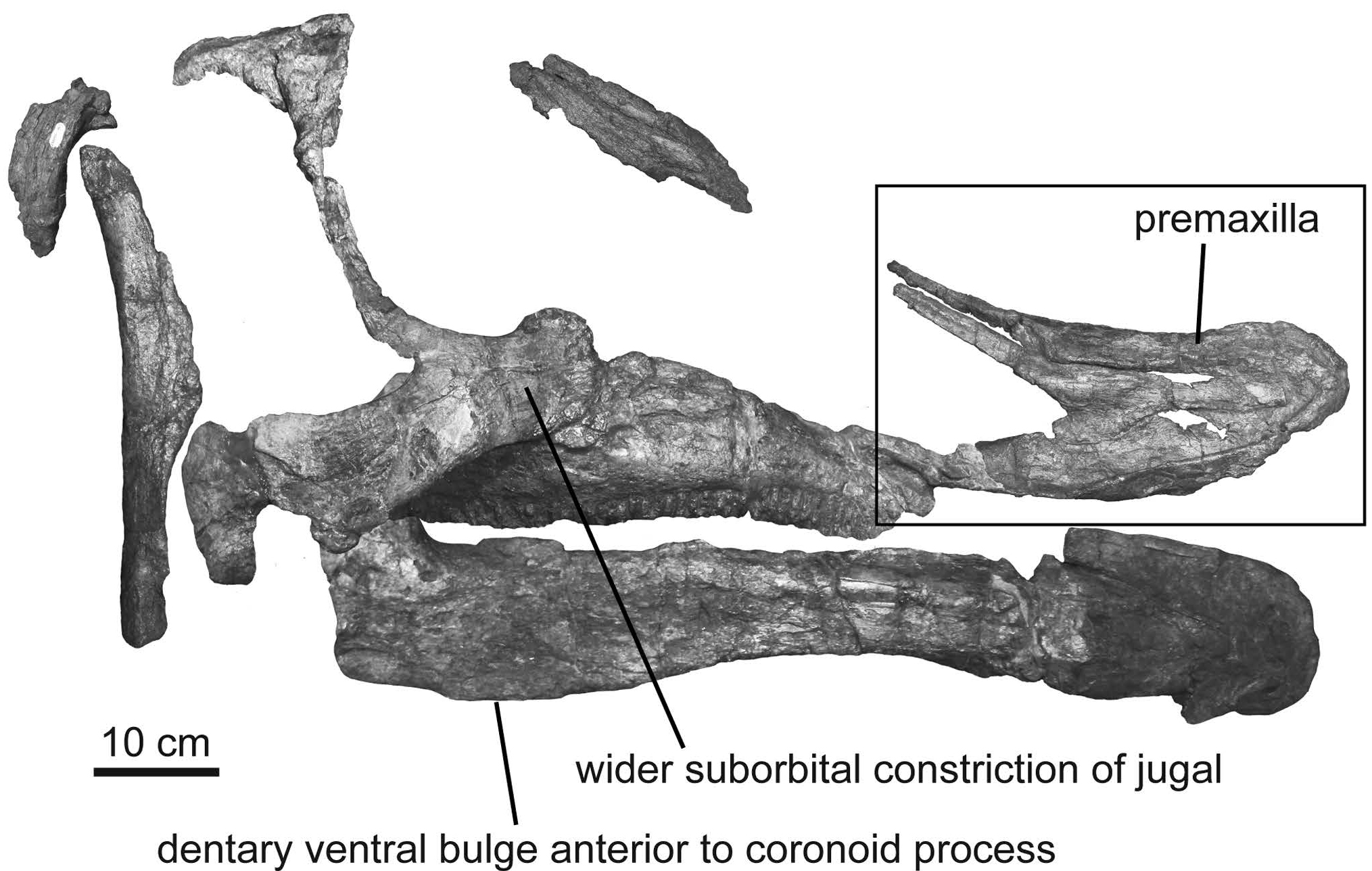
- Fossilized partial skull of the Late Cretaceous duck-billed dinosaur Augustynolophus
  †Augustynolophus
  - †Augustynolophus morrisi
- †Axonoceras
- †Bacchites
- †Baculites
  - †Baculites capensis
  - †Baculites yokoyamai – or unidentified comparable form
- Barbatia
- †Barrettia
- †Basilemys
- † Belleza
- Bernaya
- †Beudanticeras
- †Bochianites
- †Bostrychoceras
- †Brancoceras
- Bulimulus
- Bullaria
- Bullina
- †Californites – type locality for genus
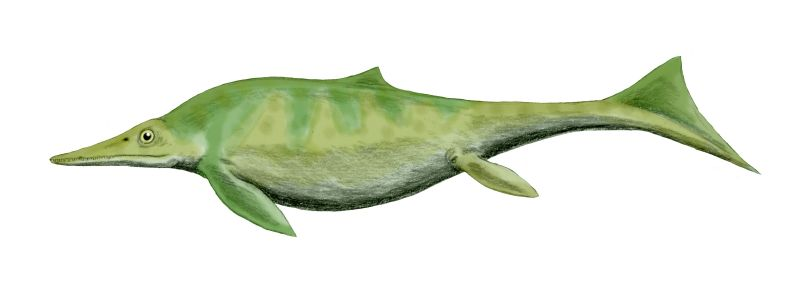
- Restoration of the Late Triassic ichthyosaur Californosaurus
  †Californosaurus
- Callianassa – tentative report
- †Calliconites
- †Calliomphalus – tentative report
- Callista – tentative report
- †Calva
- †Calycoceras
- Cancellaria – tentative report
- Cantharus
- Capulus – or unidentified comparable form
- Cardinia
- Cardita
- †Cecrops
- Cerithidea
- Cerithium
- †Cidarina
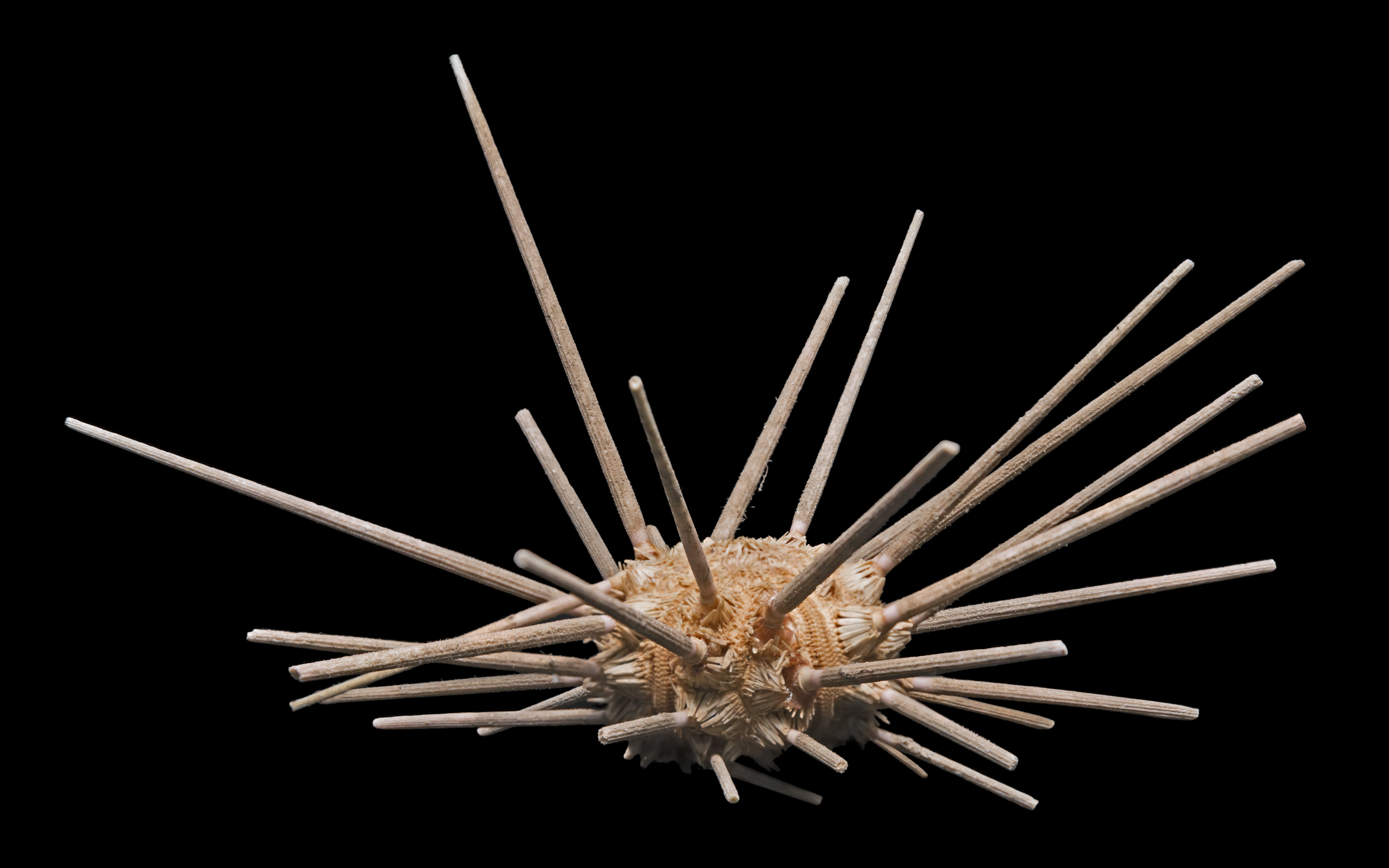
- Shell and spines of a Cidaris sea urchin
  Cidaris
- †Clinura
- †Collignoniceras
- †Collonia
- Corbicula
- Corbula
- Cornutella
- †Cosmonautilus
- †Crioceratites
- Cucullaea
- †Cunningtoniceras
- †Cyclothyris
- Cylichna
- †Cylindroteuthis
- †Cymatoceras
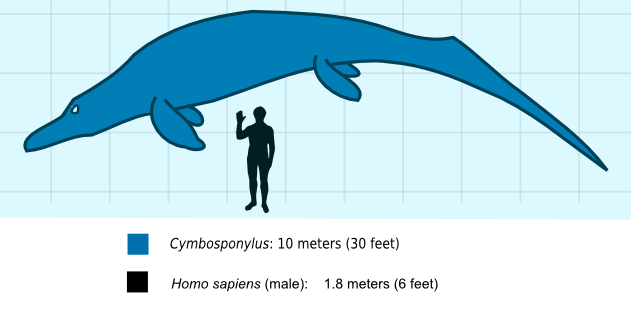
- Diagram illustrating the Middle-Late Triassic ichthyosaur Cymbospondylus with an anachronistic human to scale.
  †Cymbospondylus
  - †Cymbospondylus petrinus
- †Daonella – tentative report
  - †Daonella dubia
- †Dentalium
- †Desmoceras
- †Desmophyllites
- †Dictyoconites
- †Didymoceras
  - †Didymoceras hornbyense – or unidentified comparable form
- †Dieneria – type locality for genus
- †Discohelix – tentative report
- †Discoscaphites
- †Douvilleiceras
- †Durania
- †Echinocorys
- †Elimia
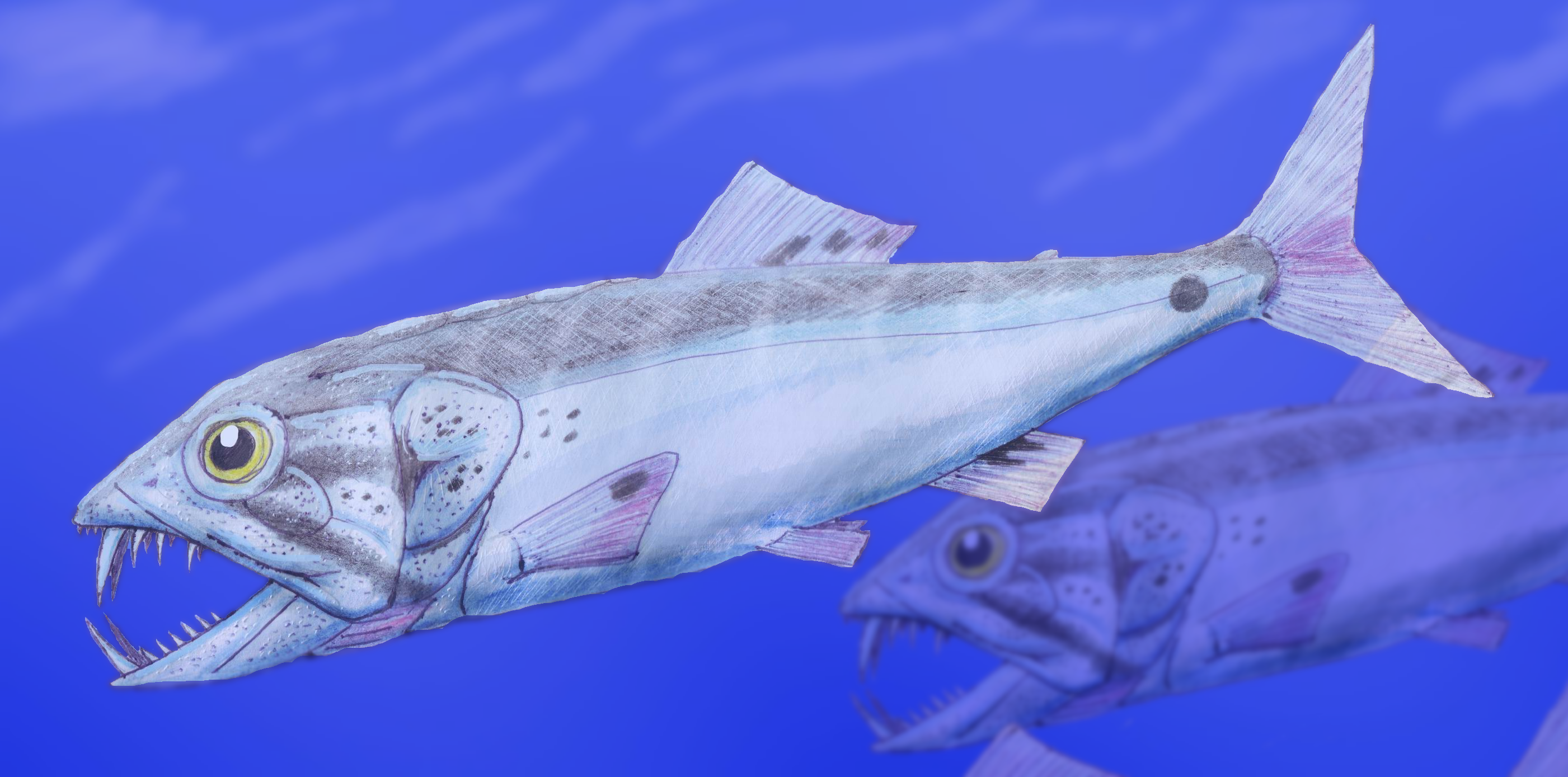
- Restoration of the Early Cretaceous-Eocene bony fish Enchodus, or the "saber-toothed herring"
  †Enchodus
- †Entobia
- †Eriphyla
- †Eucalycoceras
- †Euclastes
- †Euomphaloceras
- †Eupachydiscus
- †Euspira
- †Eutrephoceras
- †Exiteloceras
- †Exogyra
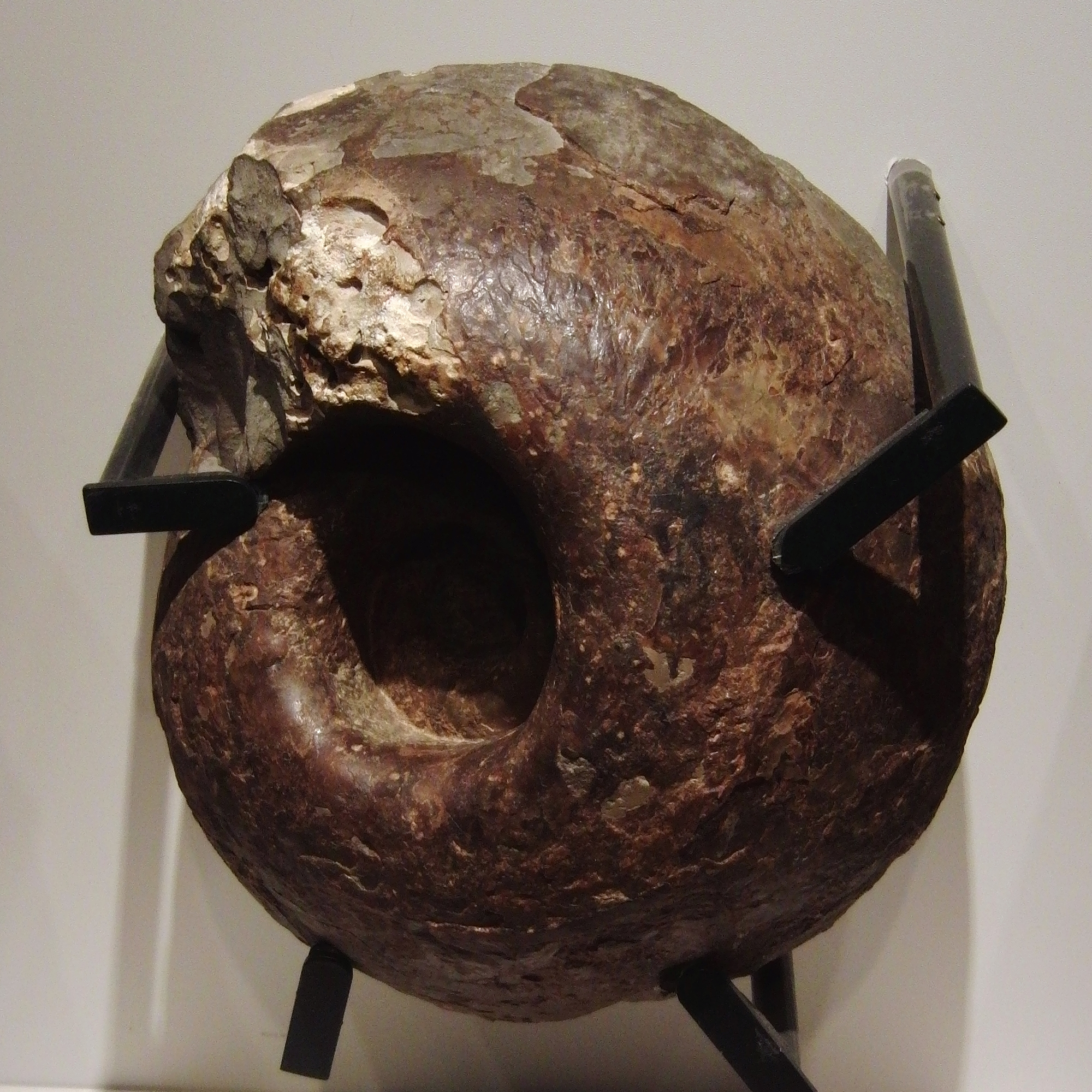
- Fossilized shell of the Late Cretaceous ammonoid cephalopod Fagesia
  †Fagesia
- Fissurella – tentative report
- †Flabellina
- †Flabellum
- †Fresnosaurus – type locality for genus
  - †Fresnosaurus drescheri – type locality for species
- Gastrochaena – tentative report
- †Gaudryceras
- †Gervillia
- Glans – tentative report
- †Glauconia
- †Globigerinelloides
- Glossus
- Glycymeris
- †Goricanites – type locality for genus
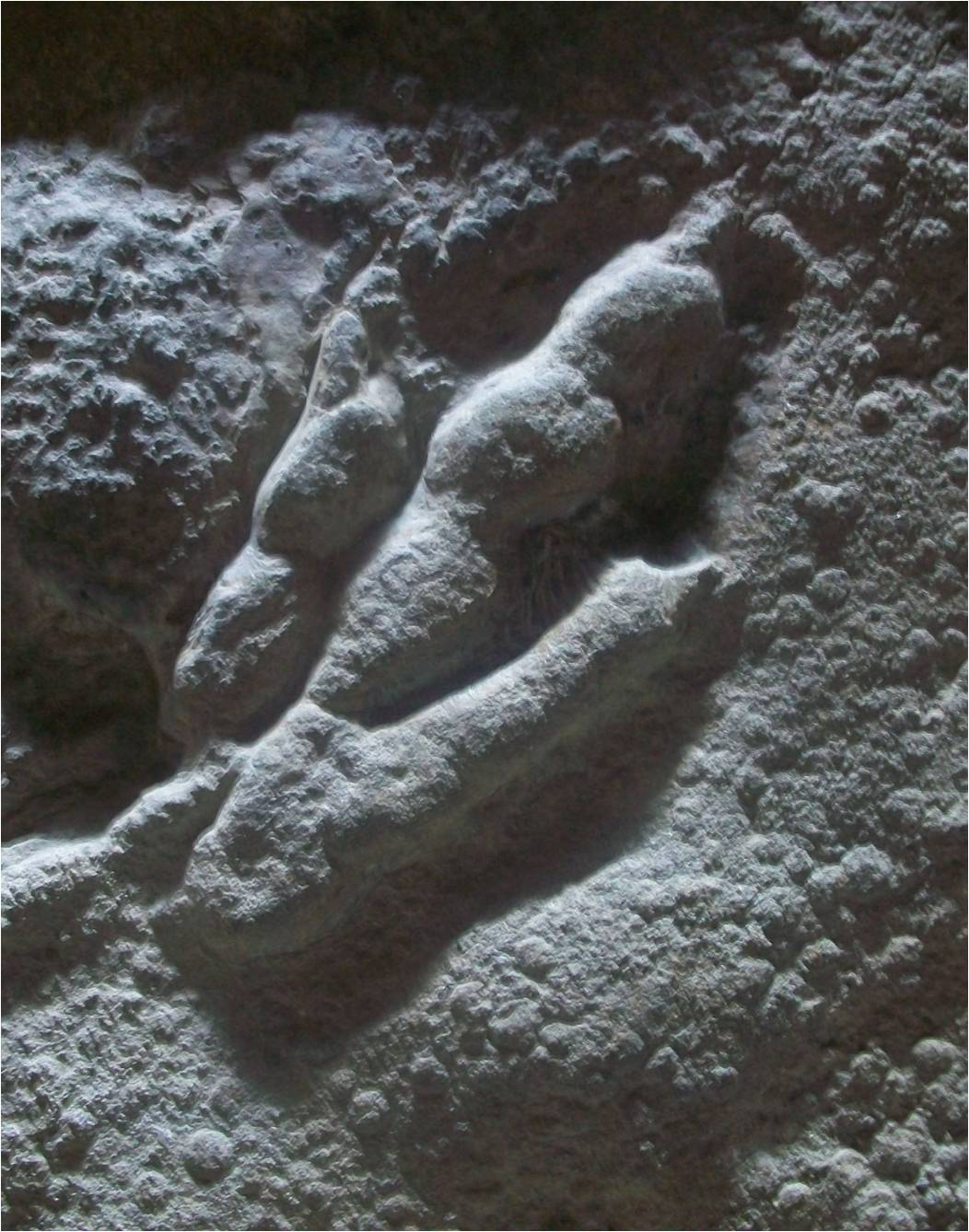
- Fossil negative with skin impressions of the theropod dinosaur footprint ichnogenus Grallator
  †Grallator
- †Gryphaea
- †Gryponautilus
- Gyroidina
- Haliotis
- †Hauericeras
- †Hecticoceras
- †Hedenstroemia
- †Helena
- †Hemicidaris
- Heptranchias
- Hipponix
- †Homerites
- †Hybodus
- †Hydrotherosaurus – type locality for genus
  - †Hydrotherosaurus alexandrae – type locality for species
- †Hypophylloceras
- †Ichthyornis
- †Ichthyosaurus
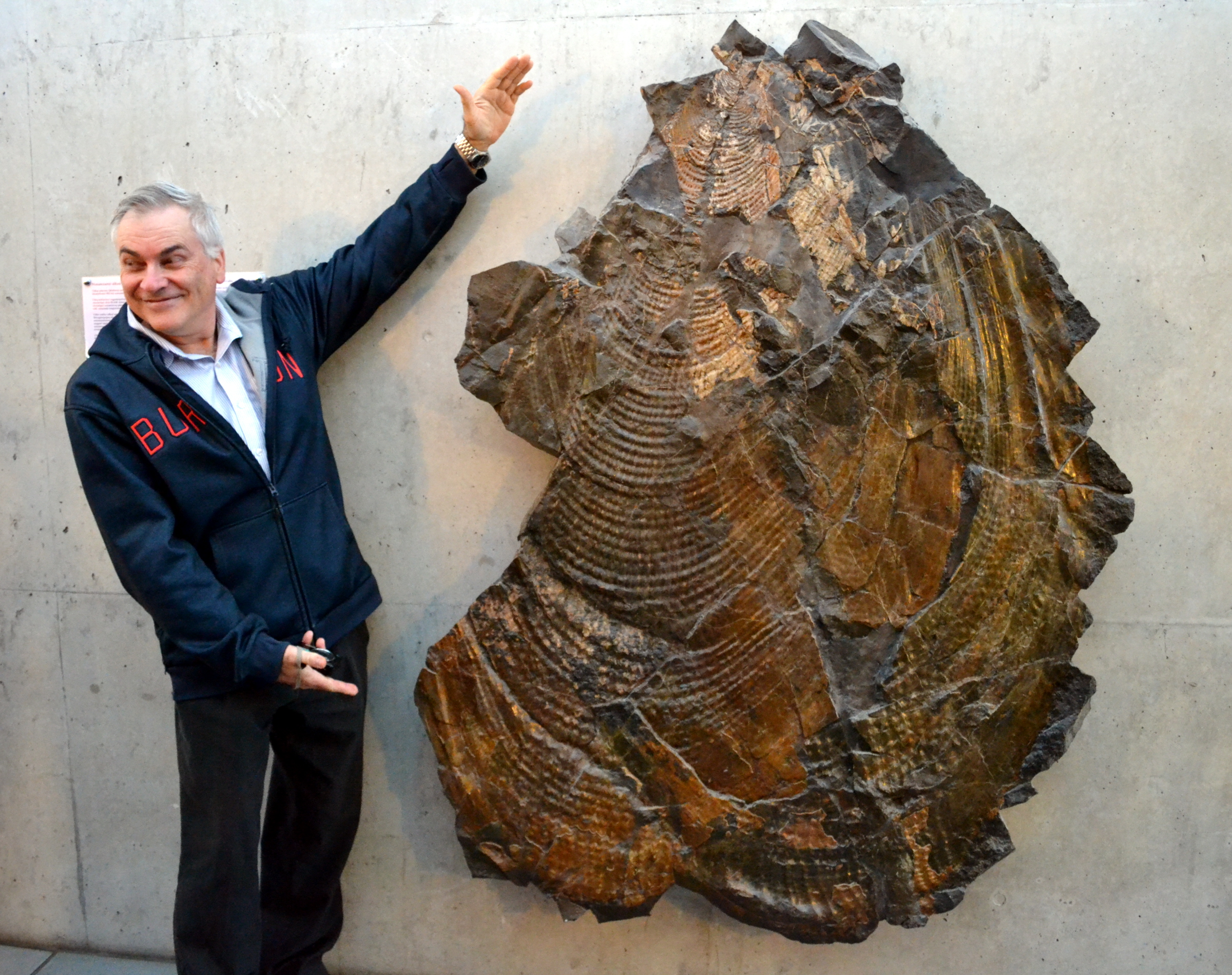
- Fossilized shell of the Early Jurassic-Late Cretaceous marine bivalve Inoceramus with a human indicating its size
  †Inoceramus
  - †Inoceramus balticus
  - †Inoceramus cordiformis – or unidentified comparable form
  - †Inoceramus incertus – or unidentified comparable form
  - †Inoceramus naumanni
  - †Inoceramus steinmanni – or unidentified comparable form
  - †Inoceramus subundatus
  - †Inoceramus teshioensis – or unidentified comparable form
  - †Inoceramus turgidus – type locality for species
- †Inyoites – type locality for genus
  - †Inyoites oweni – type locality for species
- Isognomon
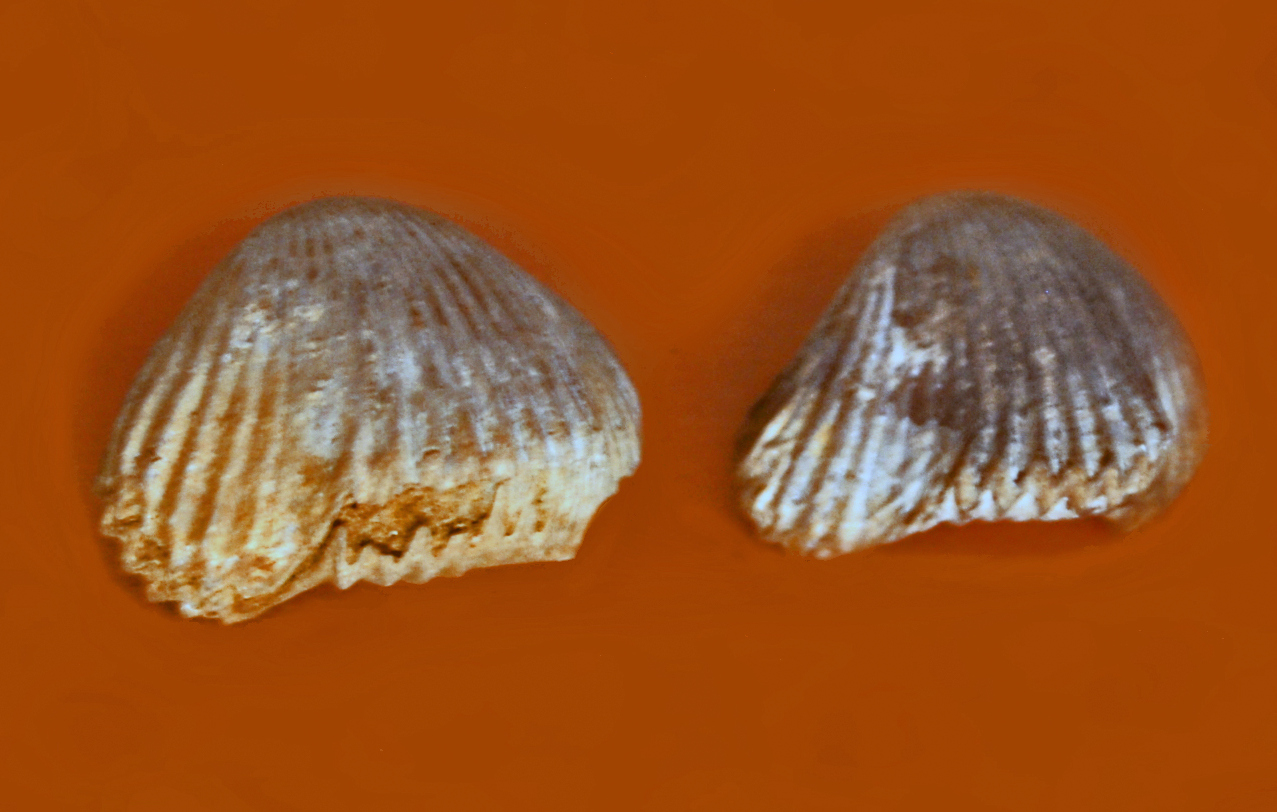
- Fossilized shells of the Jurassic brachiopod Kallirhynchia
  †Kallirhynchia
- †Kilianella
- †Kossmaticeras
- †Lacunaria
- Leda – tentative report
- Lima
- †Linearis
- †Lingula
- Lithophaga
- Lopha
- †Loxo
- †Lucina
- †Lysis
- †Lytoceras
  - †Lytoceras batesi
- Macrocallista
- †Macrocephalites
- †Mammites – tentative report
- †Mantelliceras
- Margarella
- Margarites
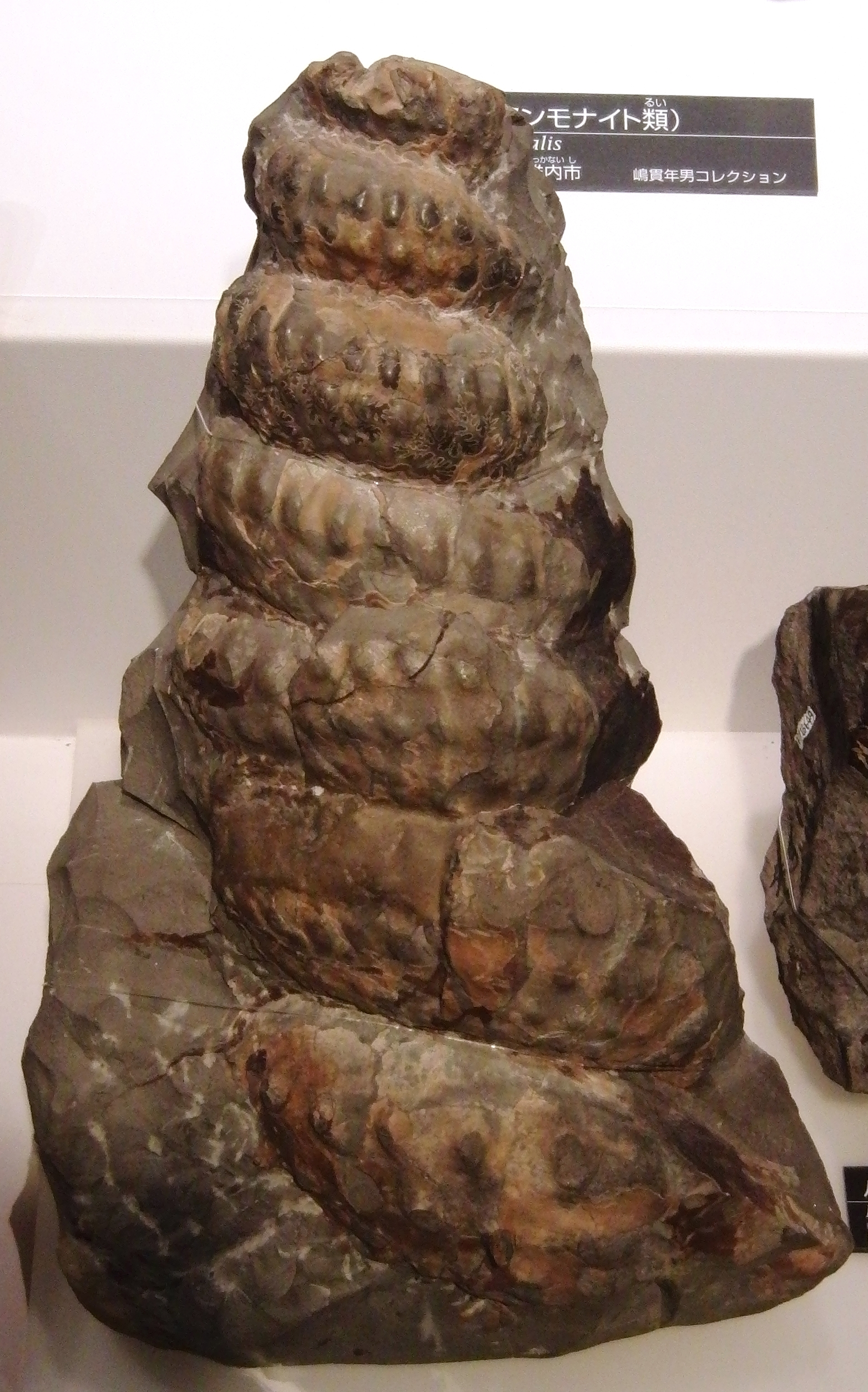
- Fossilized shell of the Early-Late Cretaceous ammonoid cephalopod Mariella
  †Mariella
- Martesia
- †Mediaster
- †Meekoceras
  - †Meekoceras gracilitatis
- †Melchiorites
- †Menuites
- †Merriamia
- † Mita – tentative report
- † Mita
- †Modiolus
- †Morenosaurus – type locality for genus
  - †Morenosaurus stocki – type locality for species
- †Mortoniceras
- Musculus – or unidentified related form
- †Myophorella
  - †Myophorella argo
  - †Myophorella dawsoni – or unidentified related form
  - †Myophorella yellowstonensis
- †Myophoria
- †Mytilus
- Natica
- †Navahopus
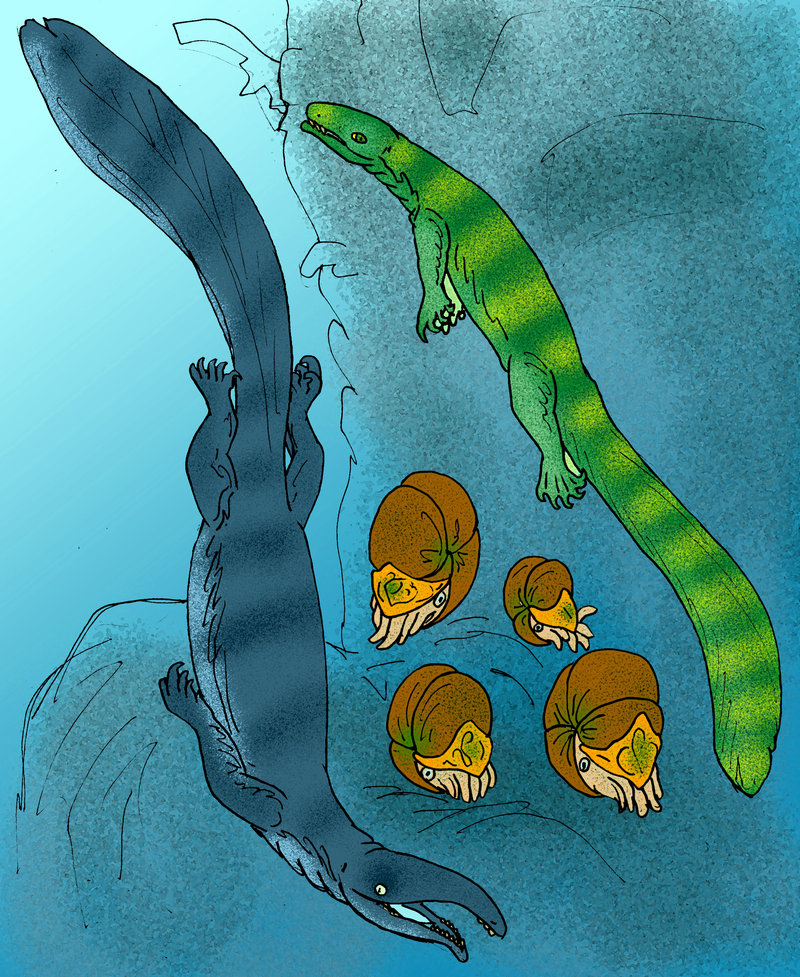
- Life restoration of the Late Triassic thalattosaurs Nectosaurus (right) and Thalattosaurus
  †Nectosaurus
- †Neithea
- †Neocardioceras – tentative report
- †Neohibolites
- †Neophylloceras
  - †Neophylloceras hetonaiense
  - †Neophylloceras ramosum
- †Nerinea
- Nerita
- †Nolita
- †Nostoceras
  - †Nostoceras splendidum
- Nucula
- Opalia
- †Ophiceras
- †Opis
- †Orthoceras
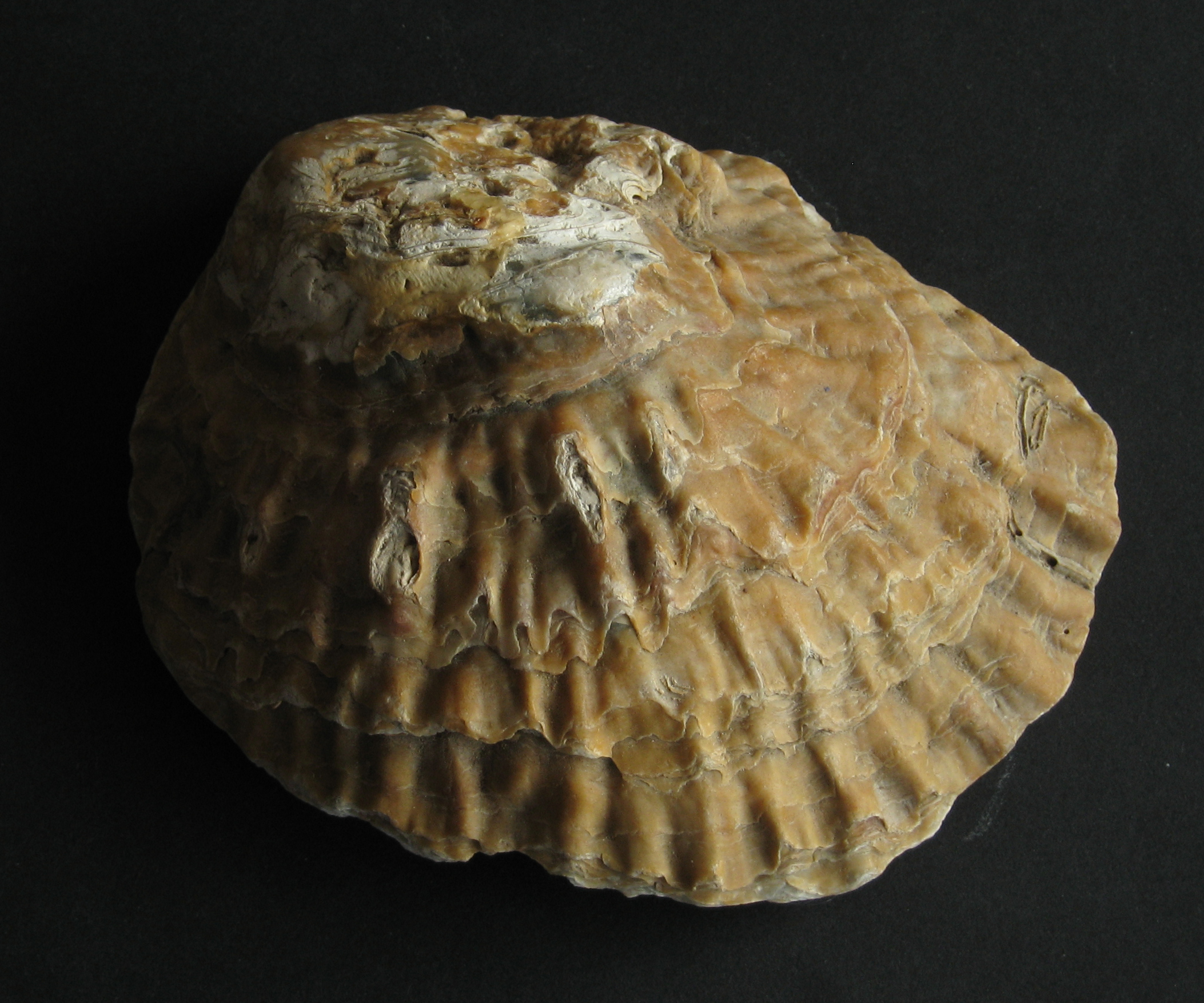
- Shell of an Ostrea, or oyster
  Ostrea
- †Owenites
  - †Owenites carpenteri
  - †Owenites koeneni – type locality for species
- †Oxynautilus
- †Oxytoma
- †Pachydesmoceras
  - †Pachydesmoceras pachydiscoide – type locality for species
- †Pachydiscus
  - †Pachydiscus ootacodensis
- Panopea
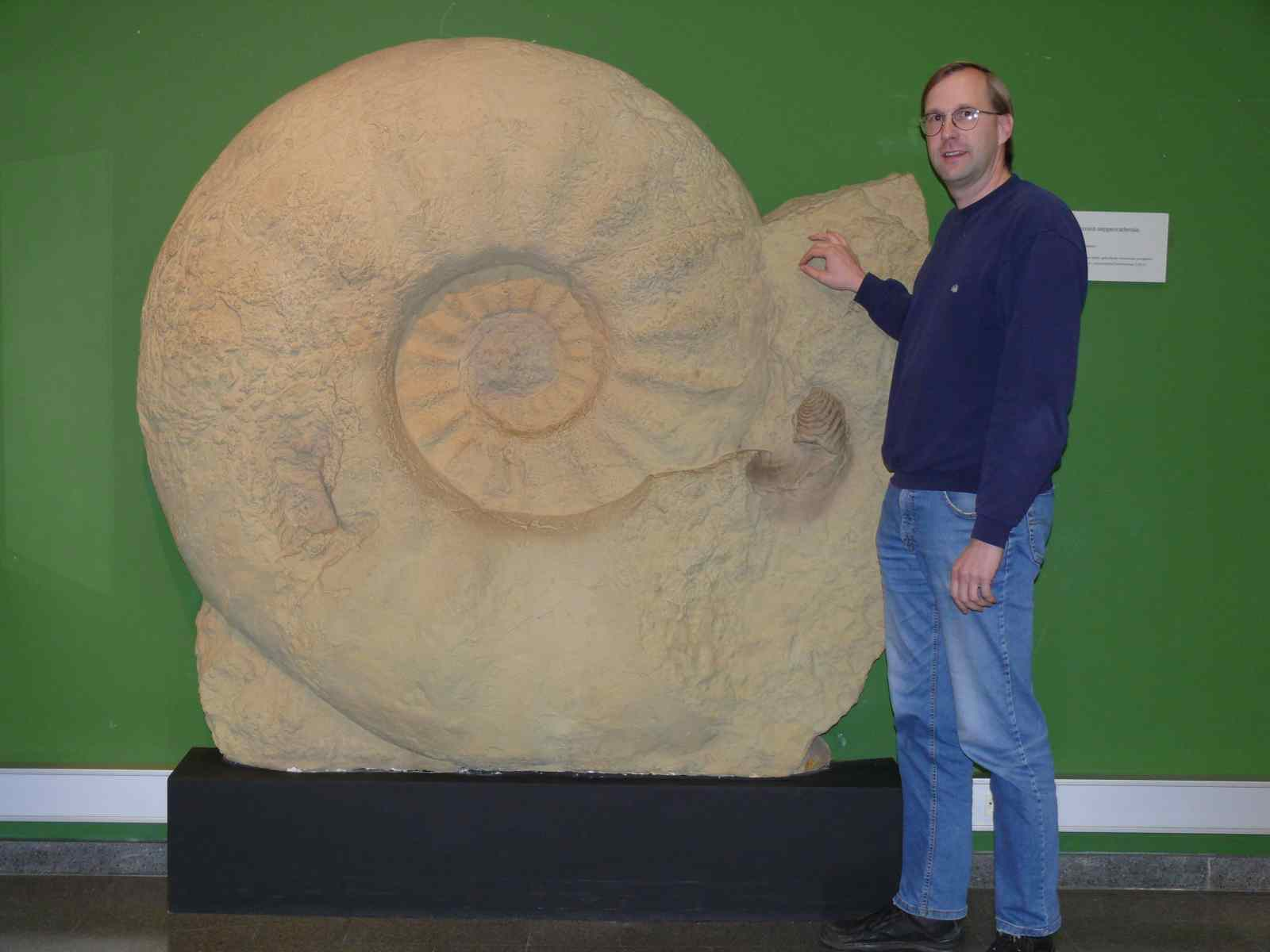
- Fossilized shell of the Late Cretaceous ammonoid cephalopod Parapuzosia with a human indicating its size
  †Parapuzosia
- Patella – report made of unidentified related form or using admittedly obsolete nomenclature
- †Pecten
- †Pedalion
- †Pentzia
- †Peroniceras
- Phanerolepida
- Pholadomya
- †Phylloceras
- †Phyllopachyceras
- †Pinna
- †Plesiotylosaurus
  - †Plesiotylosaurus crassidens
- Plicatula
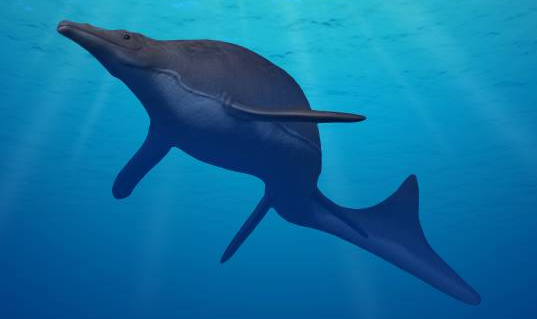
- Life restoration of the Late Cretaceous mosasaur Plotosaurus
  †Plotosaurus
  - †Plotosaurus bennisoni
  - †Plotosaurus tuckeri
- Polinices
- †Polycyclus
- †Polyptychites
- †Polyptychoceras
- †Posidonia
- †Potamides – tentative report
- †Proclydonautilus
- †Prognathodon
  - †Prognathodon waiparaensis – or unidentified comparable form
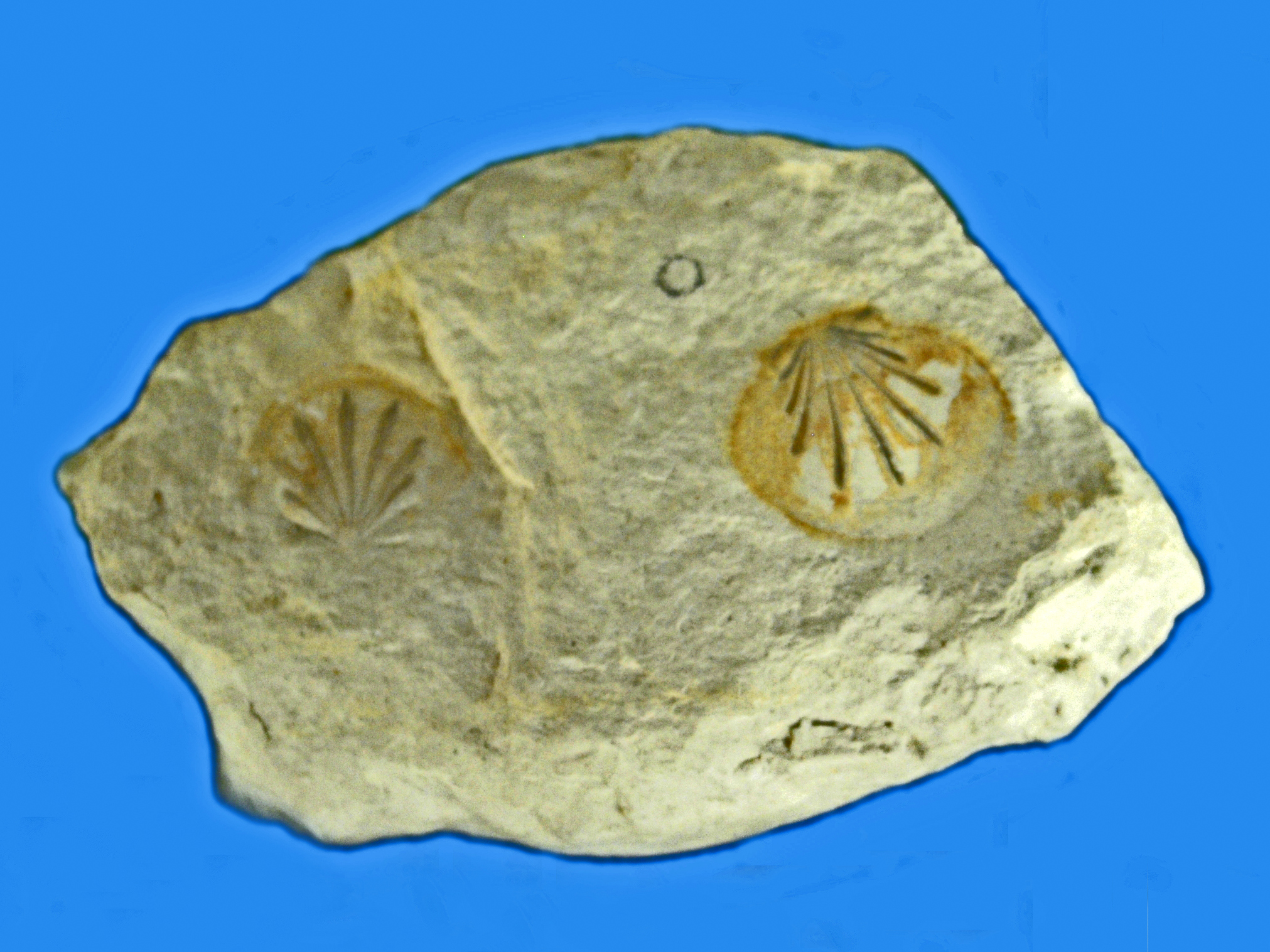
- Fossilized shells of the Triassic-modern marine bivalve Propeamussium
  Propeamussium
- †Protocardia
- †Protrachyceras
- †Pseudomelania
- †Pseudoperna
- †Pseudothurmannia – tentative report
- †Pteraichnus
- †Pterotrigonia
- †Puzosia
- Pycnodonte
- Quadrans – tentative report
- Retusa
- †Rhaetina – tentative report
- †Rhynchonella
- Rogerella
- †Romaniceras
- †Scalarites
- †Scapanorhynchus
- Scaphander
- †Scaphites
  - †Scaphites hippocrepis – or unidentified related form
- †Senis
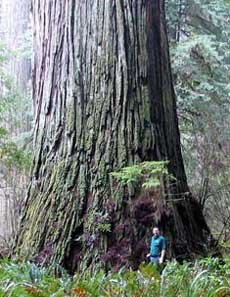
- Base of the trunk of a living Sequoia tree with a human to scale
  †Sequoia
- Serpula
- †Shastasaurus
  - †Shastasaurus alexandrae
  - †Shastasaurus pacificus
- †Shastoceras
- Siphonalia
- †Sirenites
- †Skolithos
- Solariella
- Solemya – tentative report
- Solen
- †Spiriferina – report made of unidentified related form or using admittedly obsolete nomenclature
  - †Spiriferina coreyi – type locality for species
- Spondylus
- Squalicorax
- †Sturia
- † Suna
- †Tegula
- Tellina
- †Tenea
- Terebralia – tentative report
- †Tessarolax
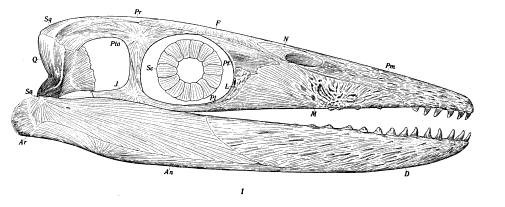
- Reconstructive illustration of the skull in side (above) and top view of the Late Triassic thalattosaur Thalattosaurus. The frontmost portion of the snout is portrayed erroneously as straight; it actually had a pronounced downward curve
  †Thalattosaurus
- Thyasira
- †Tollia
- †Tragodesmoceras
- †Trigonia
- †Trinacria
- †Trochactaeon
- Trophon
- †Turrilites
  - †Turrilites acutus
  - †Turrilites costatus – or unidentified comparable form
- Turritella
- Volsella
- †Worthenia
- †Wyomingites
- †Yezoites
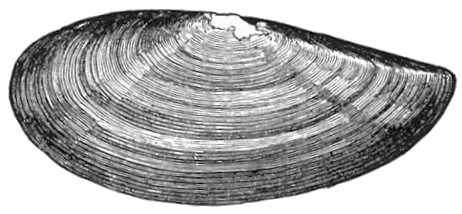
- Shell of a Yoldia limatula, or file yoldia
  Yoldia
- †Zanola
- †Zealandites

== Cenozoic ==
=== Selected Cenozoic taxa of California ===
- †Abantis
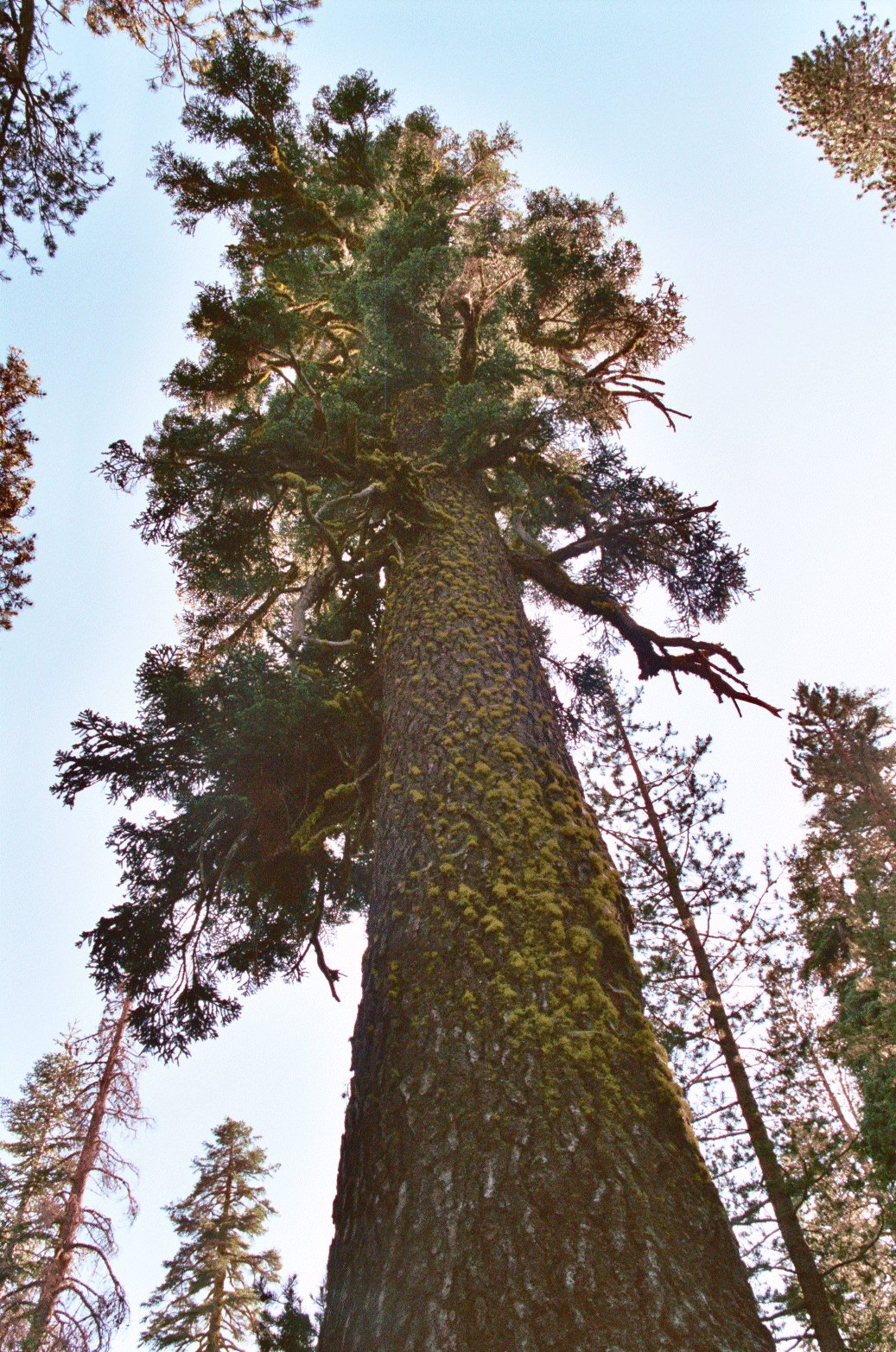
- A living Abies, or fir tree
  Abies
- †Aboma
- †Acalypha
- Acanthina
  - †Acanthina spirata
- Acanthocardia
- Acar
- Accipiter
  - †Accipiter velox
- Acentrophryne
- Acer
- Acesta
- Acipenser
  - †Acipenser medirostris – or unidentified comparable form
- Acmaea
  - †Acmaea mitra
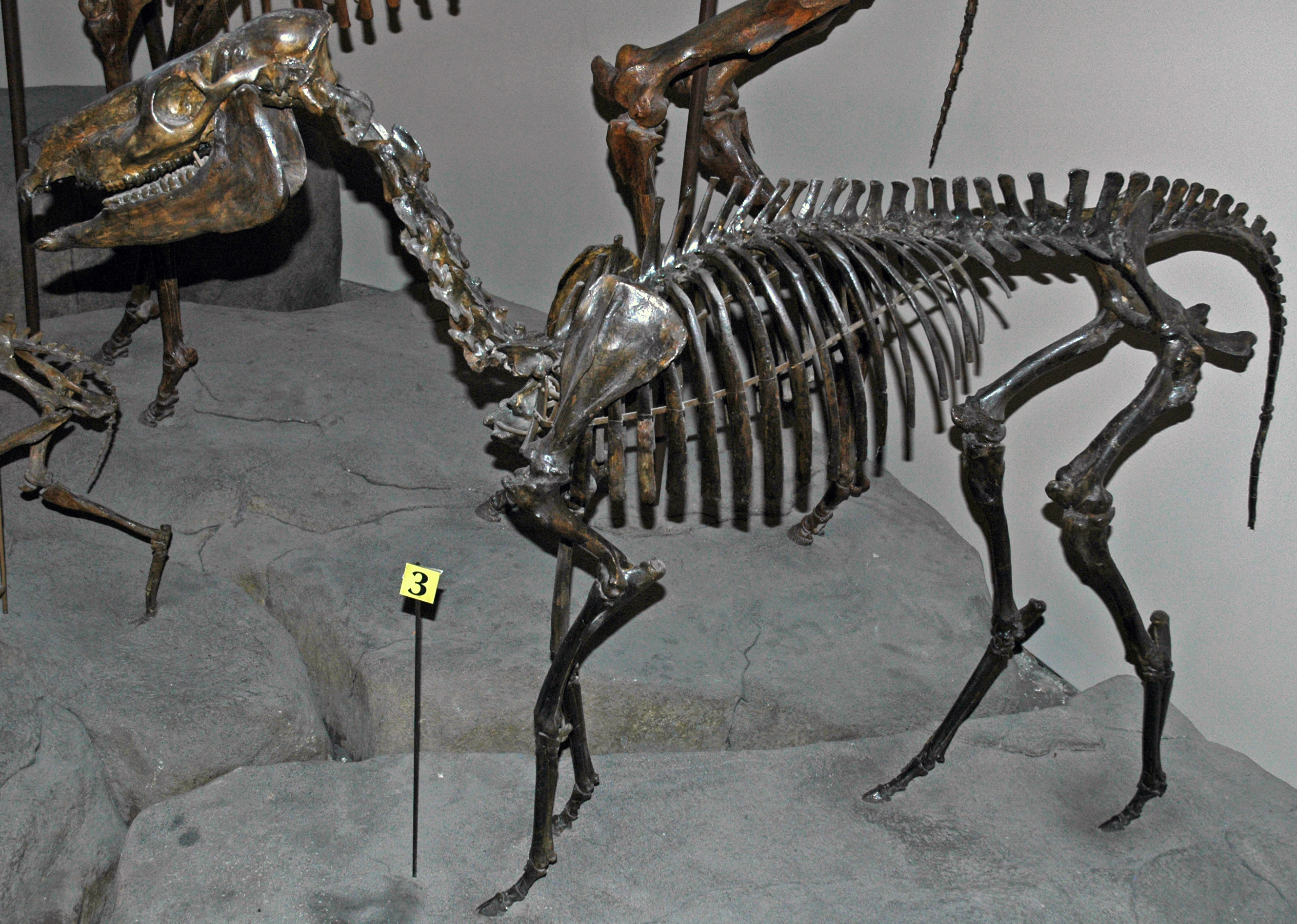
- Mounted fossilized skeleton of the Miocene horse Acritohippus
  †Acritohippus
  - †Acritohippus isonesus – or unidentified comparable form
- Acteocina
- Acteon
- Actinemys
  - †Actinemys marmorata
- Admete
  - †Admete rhyssa
- Adula
- Aechmophorus
  - †Aechmophorus occidentalis
- †Aelurodon
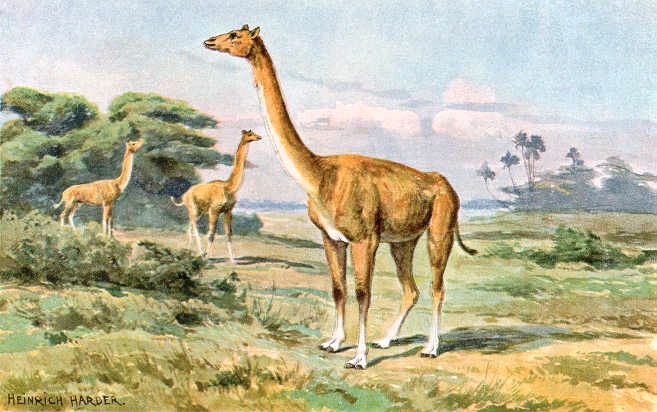
- Life restoration of the Miocene camel Aepycamelus, or the long-necked camel. Heinrich Harder (1920).
  †Aepycamelus
  - †Aepycamelus alexandrae
- Aequipecten
- Aesopus
- Aethia
- Agaronia
- Agelaius
- †Agriotherium
- †Ailanthus
- Akera
- Alaba
- Alabina
- †Albicetus
- Alca
- †Alcodes
- Aleochara
- Aletes
- †Aletomeryx
- †Alforjas
- †Alisea – type locality for genus
- †Allodelphis – type locality for genus
  - †Allodelphis pratti – type locality for species
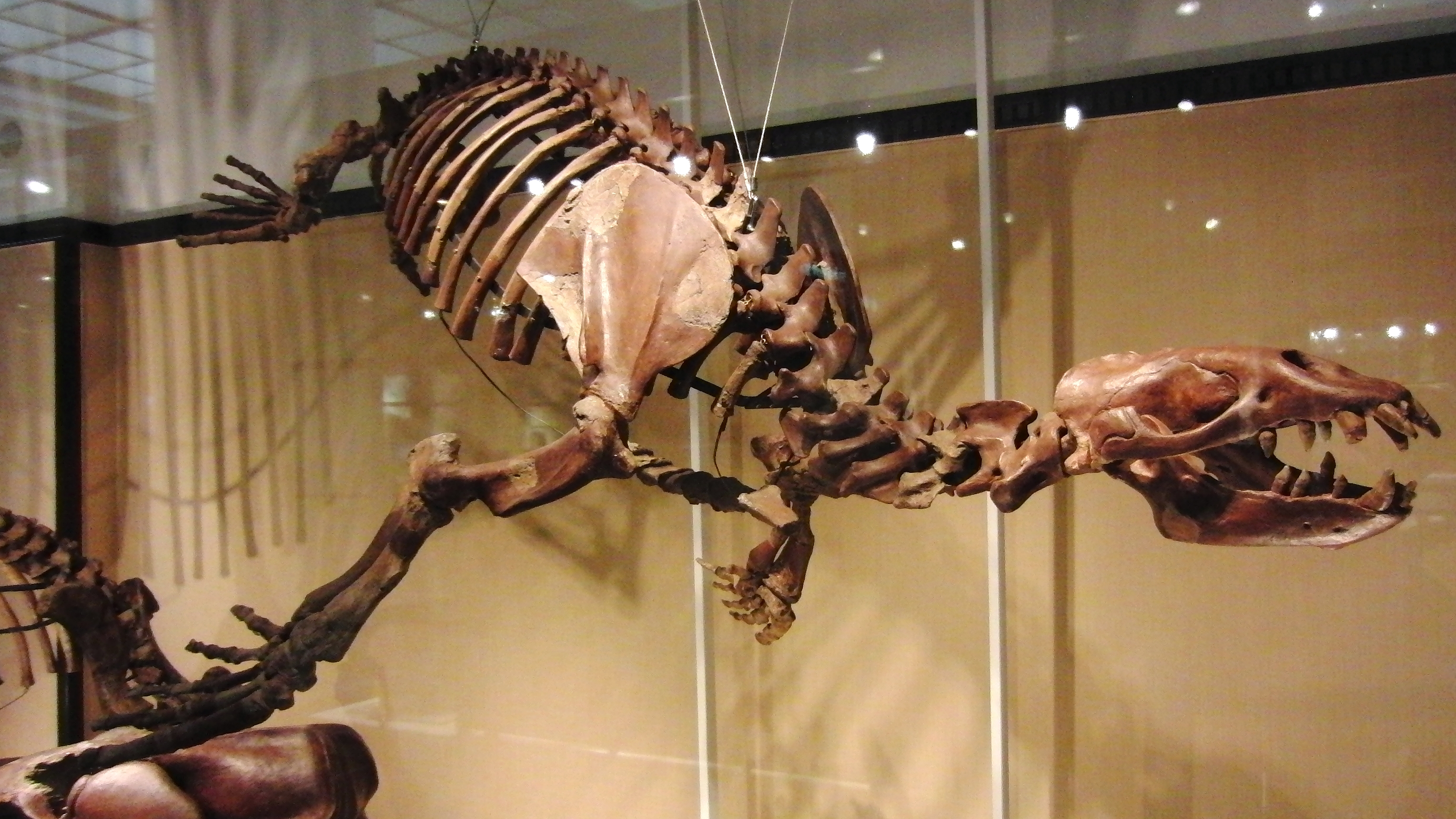
- Fossilized skeleton of the Miocene seal Allodesmus
  †Allodesmus
  - †Allodesmus kernensis
- Alnus
- †Alopecocyon – type locality for genus
- Alopias
  - †Alopias vulpinus – or unidentified comparable form
- Alvania
- Amara
  - †Amara insignis
- Amauropsis
- Amelanchier
- Ammospermophilus
- †Amorpha
- †Amphicyon
  - †Amphicyon ingens
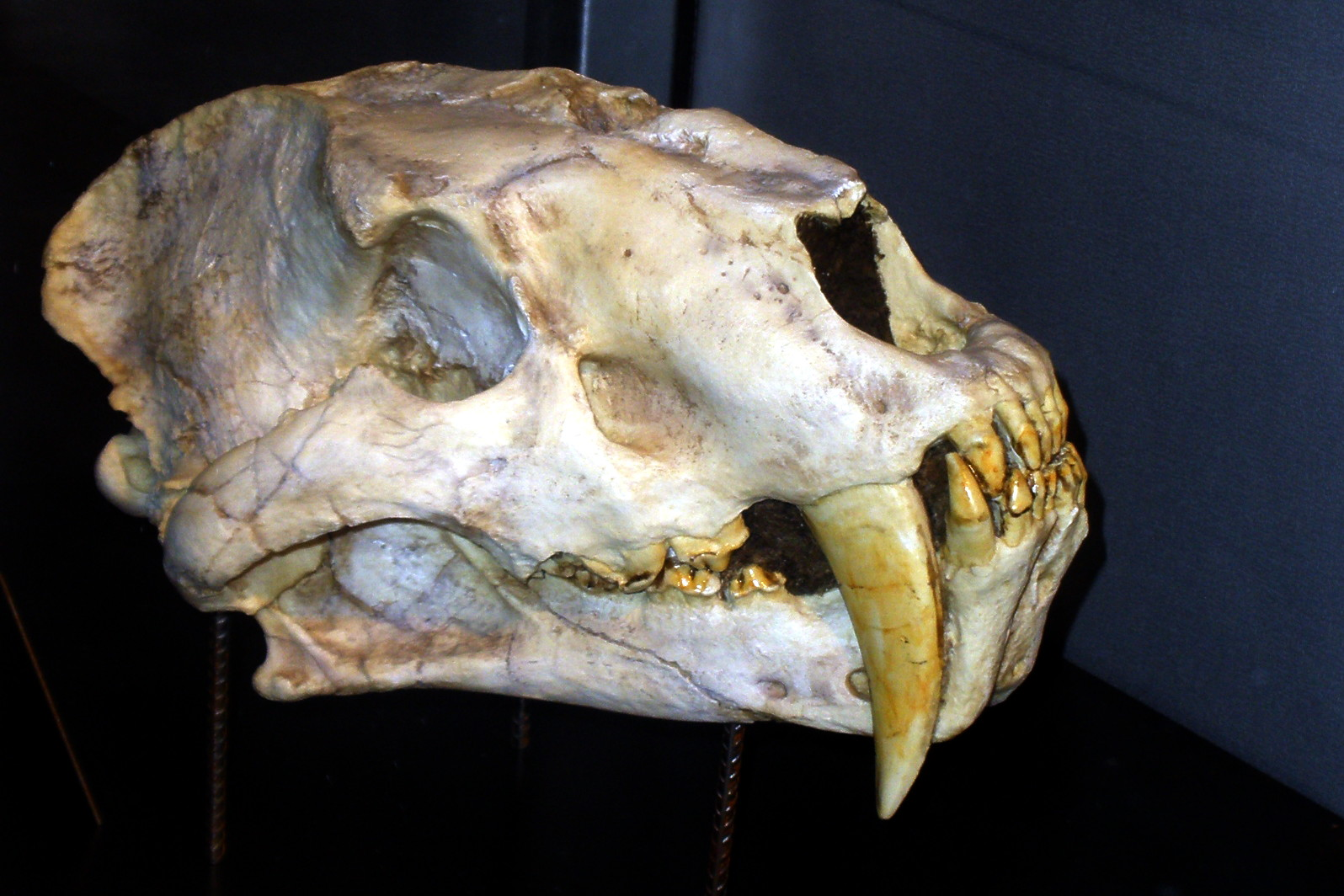
- Fossilized skull of the Miocene saber-toothed cat Amphimachairodus
  †Amphimachairodus
- Amphissa
  - †Amphissa versicolor
- Amphiura
- †Amphora
- †Ampullina
- Amusium
- Anachis
- Anadara
- Anas
  - †Anas americana
  - †Anas clypeata
  - †Anas platyrhynchos
- †Anchitheriomys – or unidentified comparable form
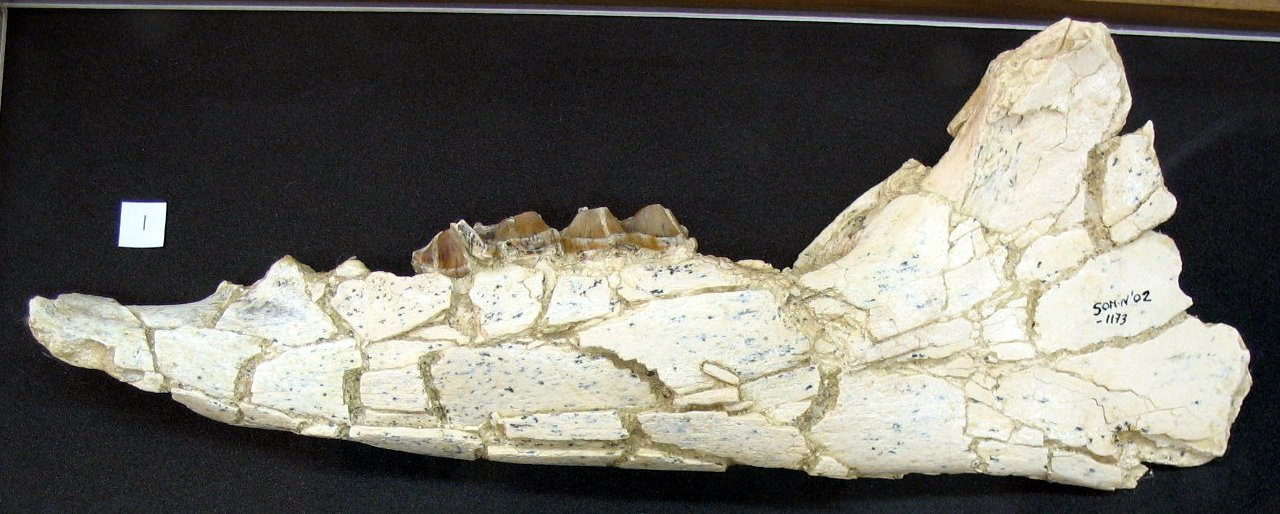
- Fossilized mandibles of the Miocene three-toed horse Anchitherium
  †Anchitherium
- Ancilla
- Angulus
- Anniella
- Anodontia
- Anomia
- †Ansen
- Anser
  - †Anser albifrons
- Antigona
- †Antilla
- Antilocapra
- Antrozous
  - †Antrozous pallidus
- Aphelocoma
  - †Aphelocoma californica
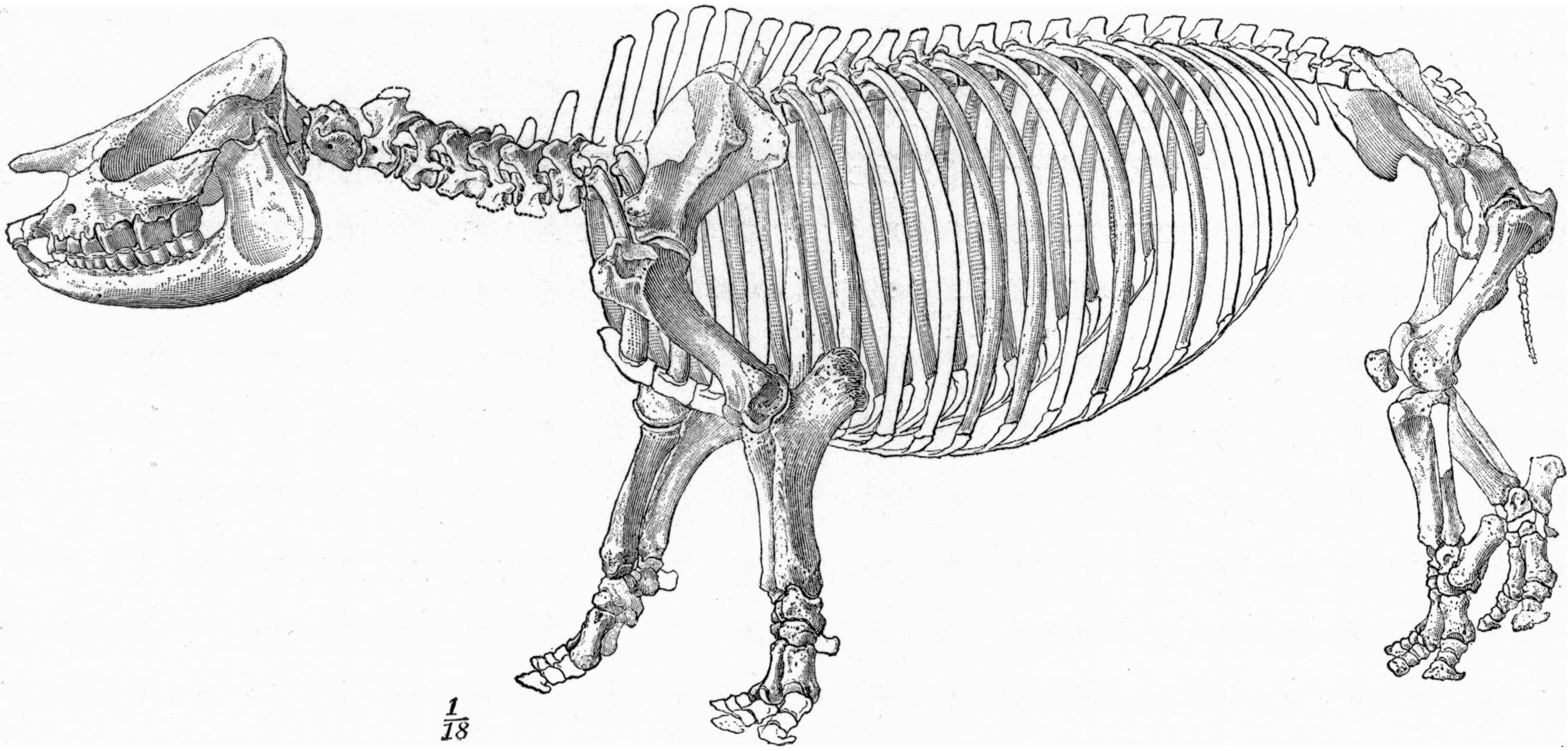
- Reconstructive illustration of the skeleton of the Miocene-Pleistocene hornless rhinoceros Aphelops
  †Aphelops
- Apiotoma
- Aplodontia
  - †Aplodontia rufa
- Aquila
  - †Aquila chrysaetos
- †Araeosteus
  - †Araeosteus rothi
- Arbutus
- Arca
- †Arceuthobium
- †Archaeocyon
- †Archaeohippus
- Architectonica
- Archoplites
  - †Archoplites interruptus
- Arcinella
- Arctica – tentative report
- Arctocephalus
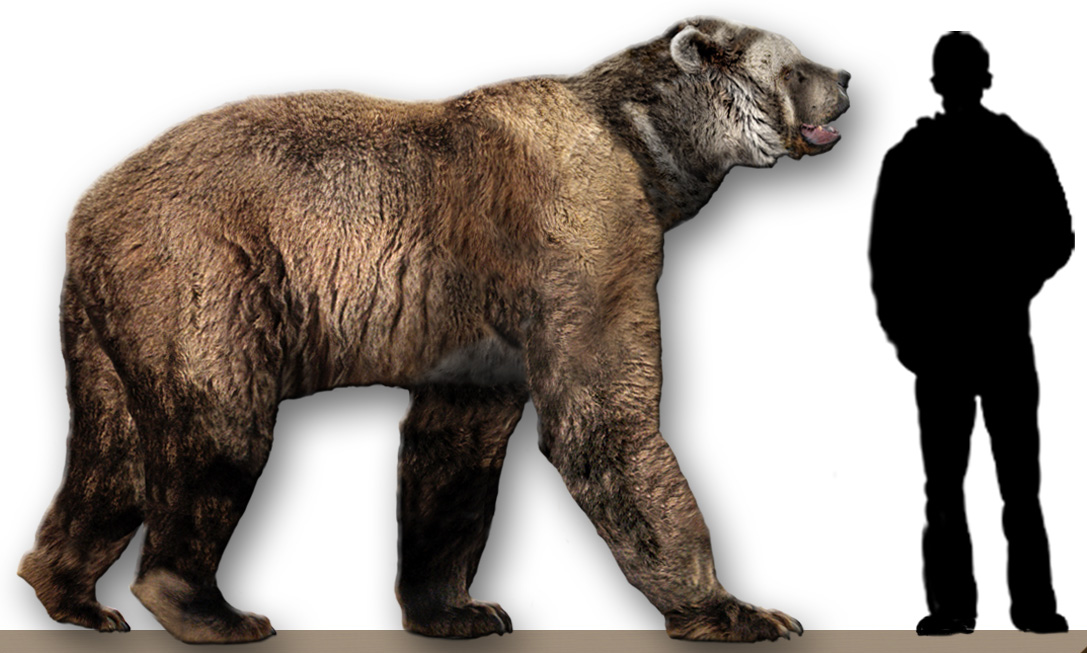
- Restoration of an Arctodus, or short-faced bear, with a human to scale
  †Arctodus
  - †Arctodus simus – type locality for species
- †Arctostaphylos
- Ardea
  - †Ardea herodias
- Arenaria
  - †Arenaria melanocephala
- Arene
- †Argenna
- Argobuccinum
- Argopecten
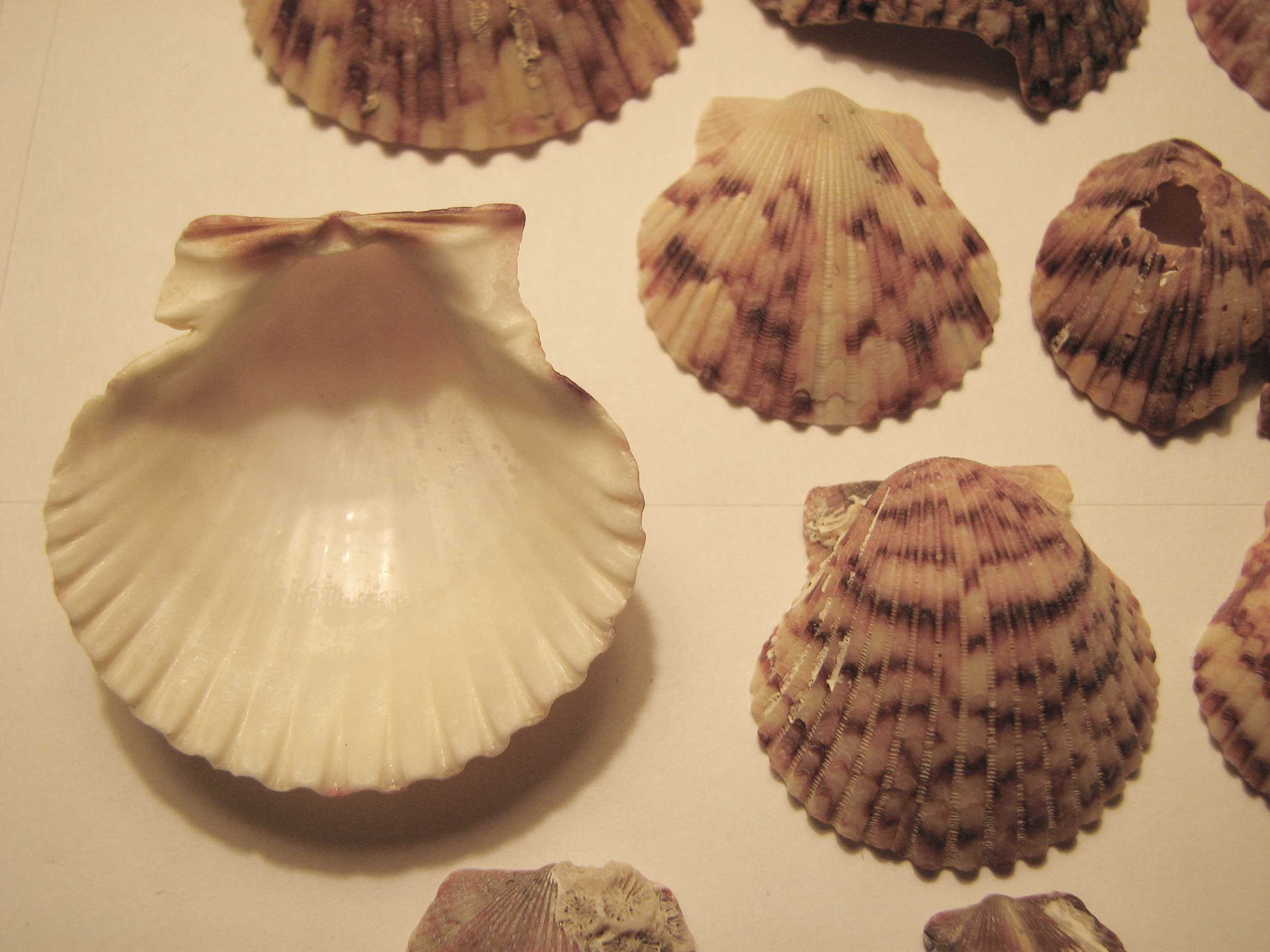
  - Shells of Argopecten gibbus, or Atlantic calico scallops
    †Argopecten gibbus
  - †Argopecten purpuratus
- Argyropelecus
- †Artocarpus
- Asio
  - †Asio wilsonianus
- Astraea
  - †Astraea undosa
- Astrangia
- Astropecten
- Astyris
- Athene
  - †Athene cunicularia
- Athleta
- †Atocetus
  - †Atocetus nasalis – type locality for species
- Atrina
- †Aturia
- Atys
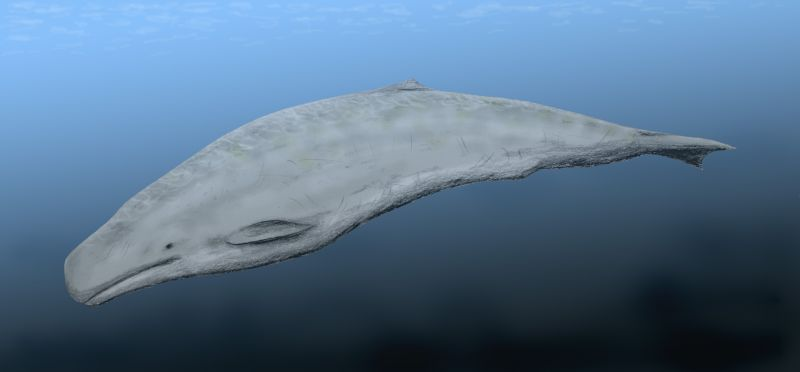
- Life restoration of the Miocene sperm whale Aulophyseter
  †Aulophyseter – type locality for genus
- Austrotrophon
- †Avipeda
- Aythya
  - †Aythya affinis
  - †Aythya valisineria
- Baiomys
- Balaenoptera
  - †Balaenoptera physalus
  - †Balaenoptera ryani
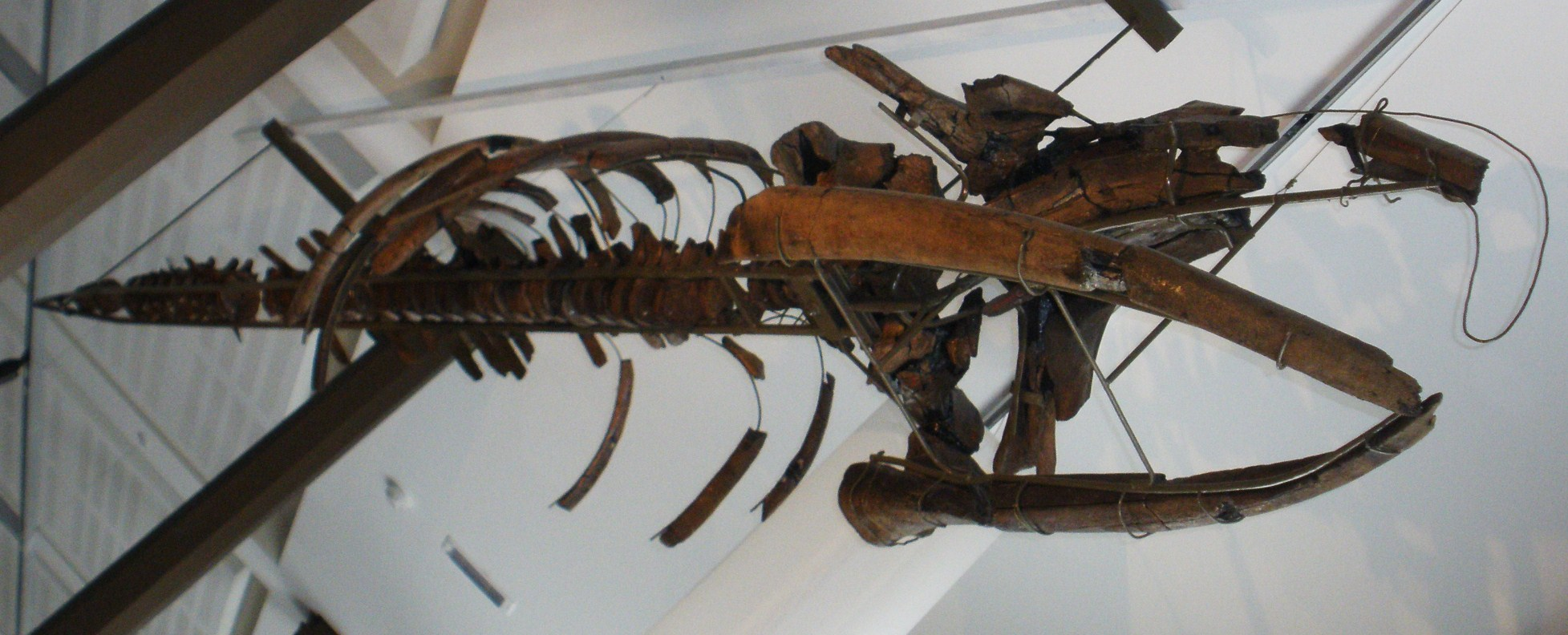
- Mounted fossilized skeleton of the Pliocene whale Balaenula
  †Balaenula
- Balanophyllia
  - †Balanophyllia elegans
- Balanus
  - †Balanus crenatus
  - †Balanus nubilus – or unidentified comparable form
- Bankia
- Barbarofusus
- Barbatia
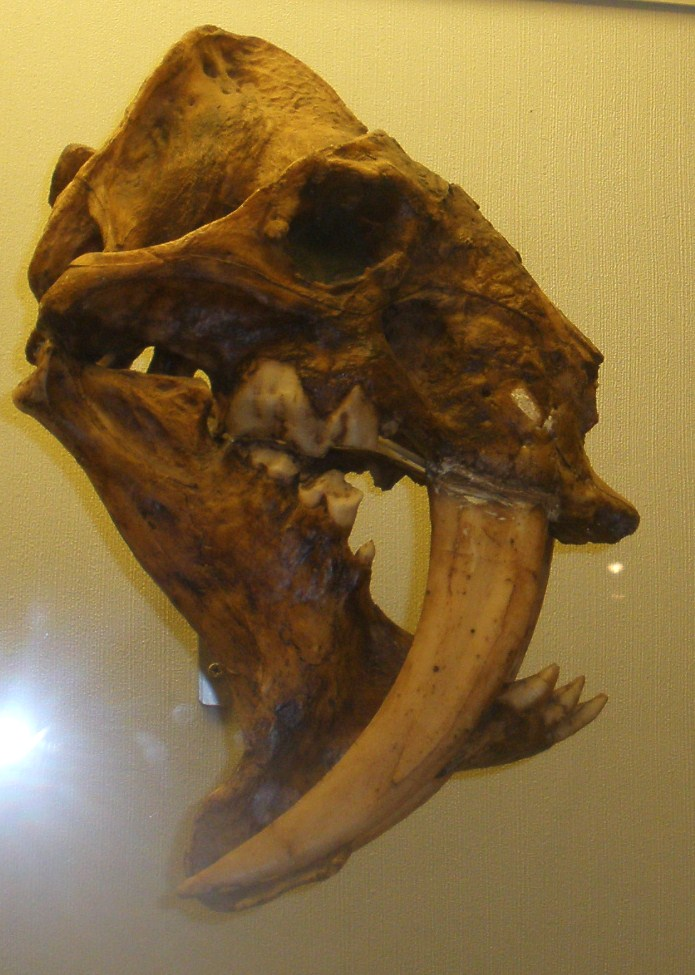
- Fossilized skull of the Miocene-Pliocene false saber-toothed cat Barbourofelis
  †Barbourofelis
  - †Barbourofelis whitfordi
- Barleeia
- Barnea
- †Basirepomys
- Bassariscus
  - †Bassariscus astutus – or unidentified comparable form
- †Bathylagus – type locality for genus
- Bathytoma
  - †Bathytoma pacifica
- †Batodonoides
- Bembidion
- †Benoistia
- Beringraja
  - †Beringraja binoculata – or unidentified comparable form
- Betula
- Bison
  - †Bison antiquus
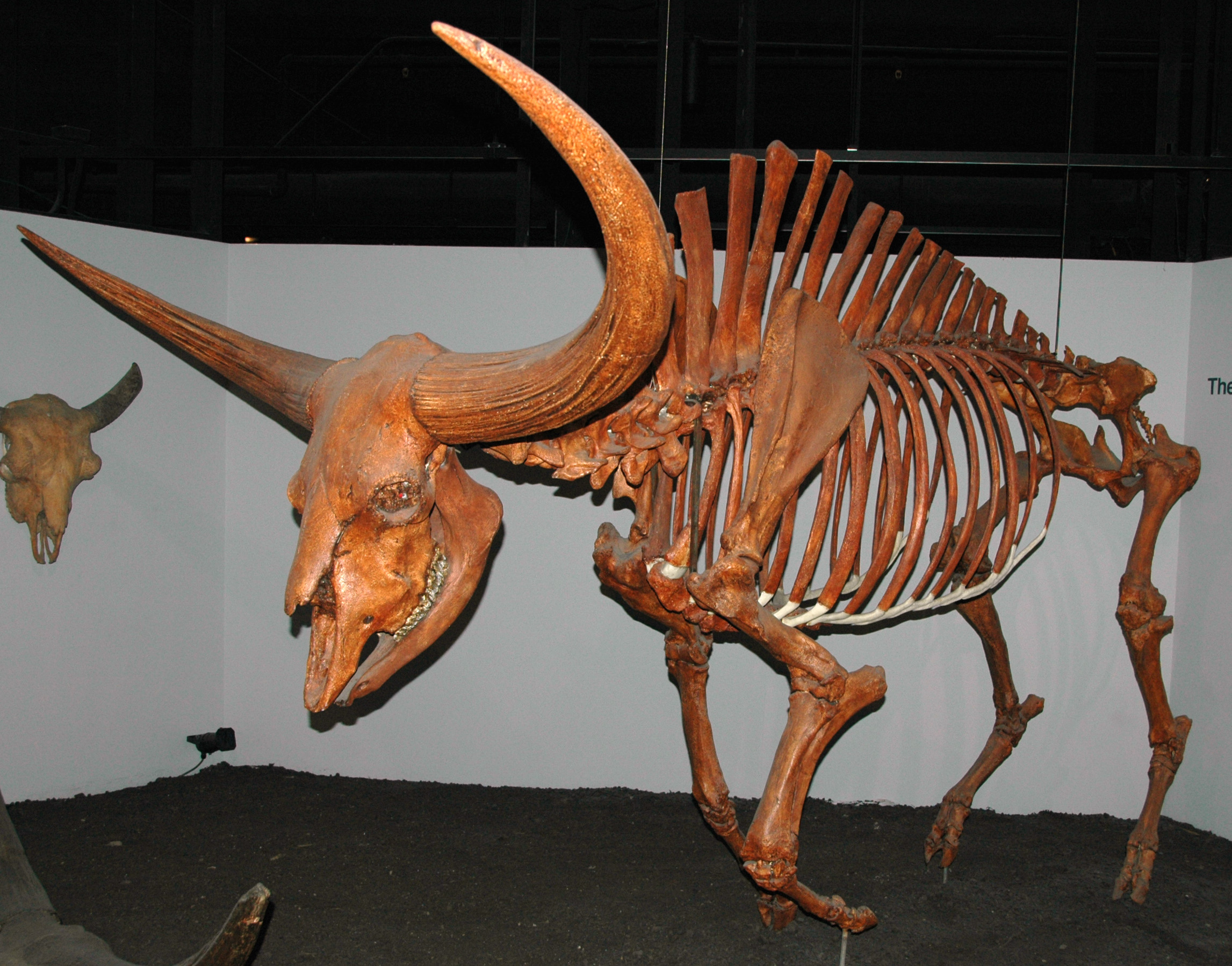
  - Mounted fossilized skeleton of the Pleistocene Bison latifrons, also known as the giant bison or long-horned bison
    †Bison latifrons
- Bittium
  - †Bittium alternatum – or unidentified comparable form
- Bivetopsia
- †Boavus
- †Bolbocara
- Bolinichthys
- Bonasa
  - †Bonasa umbellus
- †Bonellitia
- †Borophagus
  - †Borophagus diversidens
  - †Borophagus littoralis – type locality for species
  - †Borophagus parvus
  - †Borophagus secundus
- †Borophryne
  - †Borophryne apogon
- Brachidontes
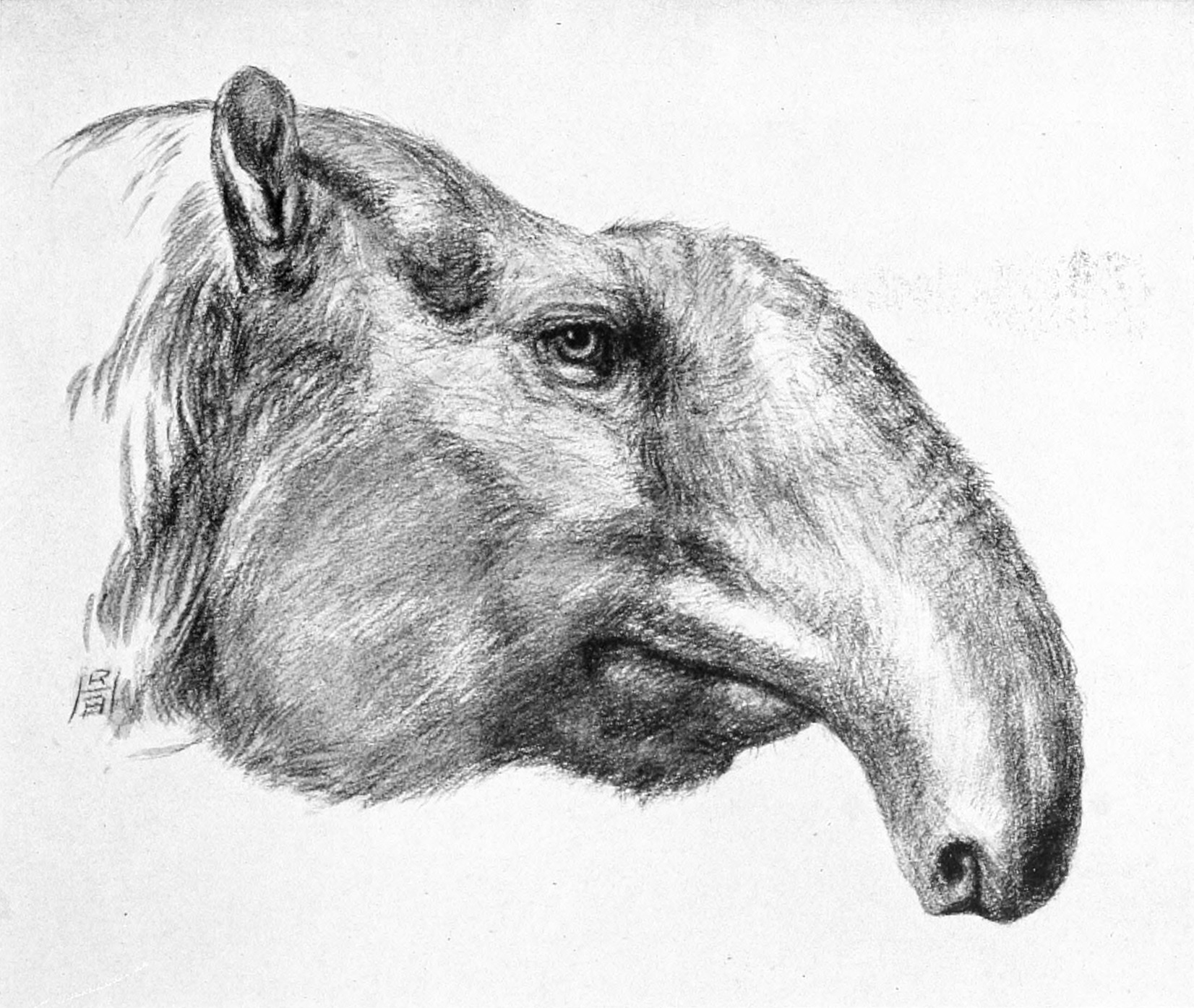
- Restorative portrait of the Miocene oreodont mammal Brachycrus
  †Brachycrus
- †Brachypsalis
- Brachyramphus
- Branta
  - †Branta canadensis
  - †Branta nigricans – tentative report
- Bubo
  - †Bubo virginianus
- Buccinum
  - †Buccinum strigillatum
- Bucephala
  - †Bucephala albeola
- †Bucida
- Bufo
- Bulla
  - †Bulla gouldiana
  - †Bulla striata
- Bullia
- †Bumelia
- Bursa
- Buteo
  - †Buteo borealis
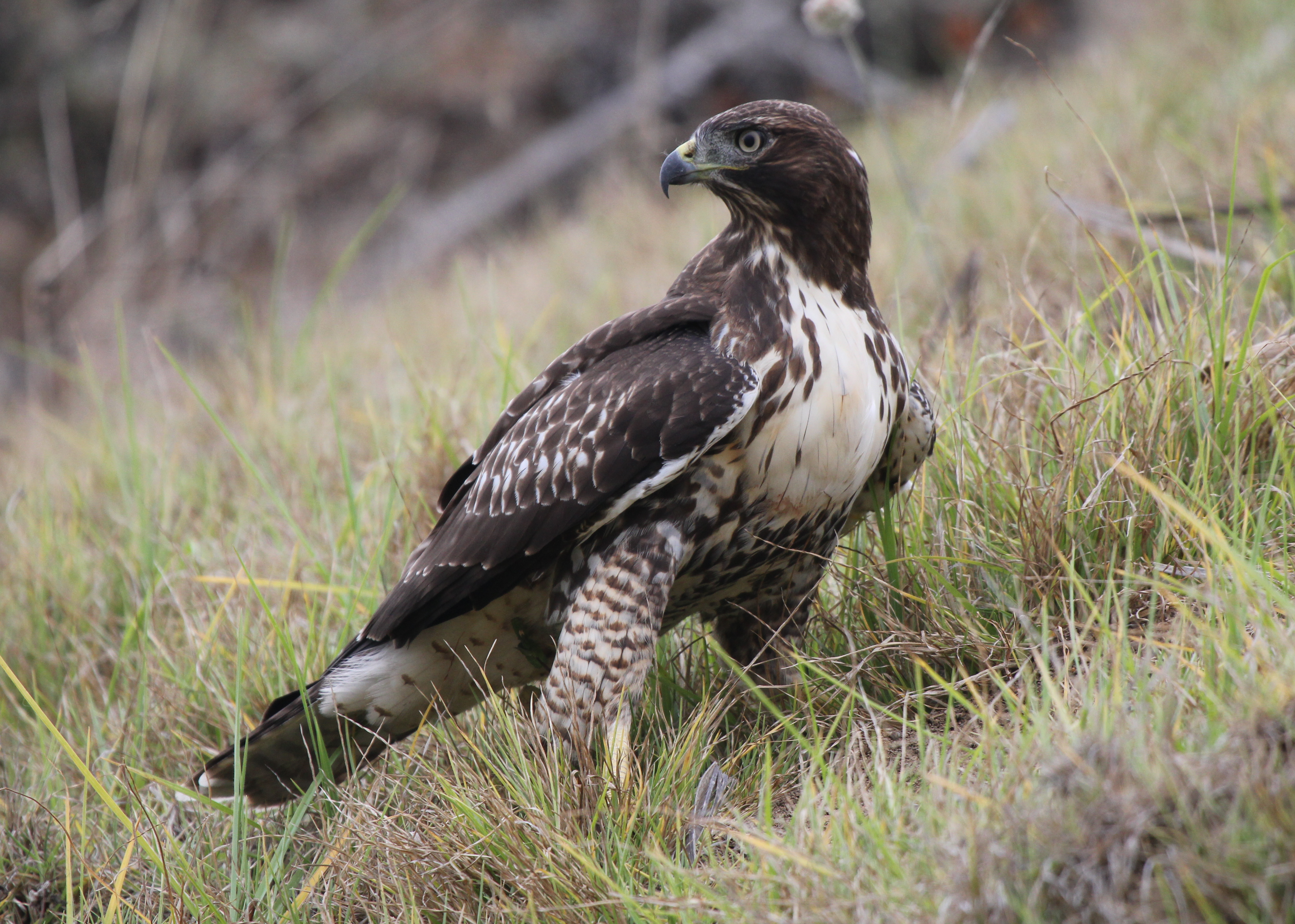
  - A living Buteo jamaicensis, or red-tailed hawk
    †Buteo jamaicensis
  - †Buteo swainsoni
- Cadulus
- Caecum
- †Calicovatellus – type locality for genus
  - †Calicovatellus petrodytes – type locality for species
- Calidris
  - †Calidris alba
- Californiconus
  - †Californiconus californicus
- Calliostoma
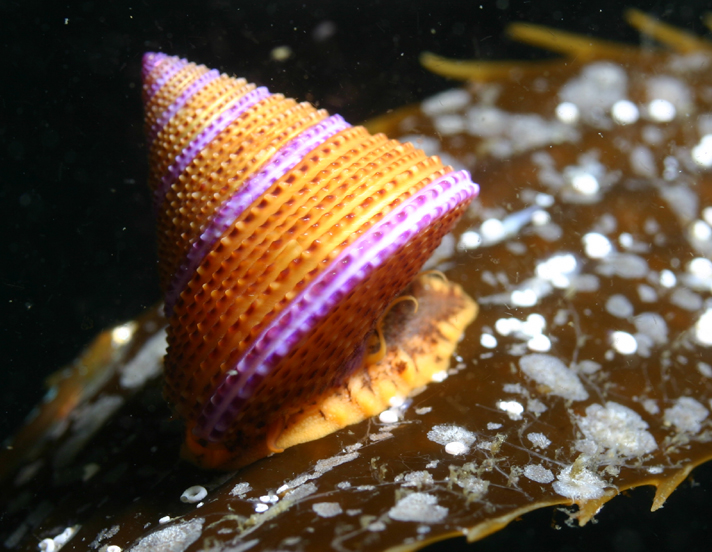
  - A living Calliostoma annulatum, or purple-ring top sea snail
    †Calliostoma annulatum
  - †Calliostoma canaliculatum
  - †Calliostoma gemmulatum
  - †Calliostoma ligatum
  - †Calliostoma supragranosum
  - †Calliostoma tricolor
- Callista
- Callorhinus
  - †Callorhinus ursinus
- Calosoma
  - †Calosoma semilaeve
- Calyptraea
- †Calyptranthes
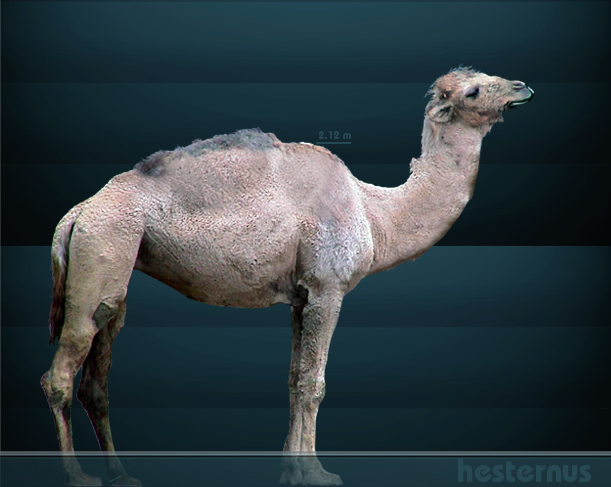
- Life restoration of the Pliocene-Holocene camel Camelops
  †Camelops
  - †Camelops hesternus
  - †Camelops minidokae
- Campanile
- Camponotus – type locality for genus
  - †Camponotus festinatus – type locality for species
- †Canarium
- Cancellaria
  - †Cancellaria obesa
- Cancer
- Canis
  - †Canis dirus
  - †Canis edwardii
  - †Canis latrans
  - †Canis lepophagus
  - †Canis lupus
  - †Canis rufus
- Canthon
  - †Canthon praticola
  - †Canthon simplex
- †Cantius
- †Capromeryx
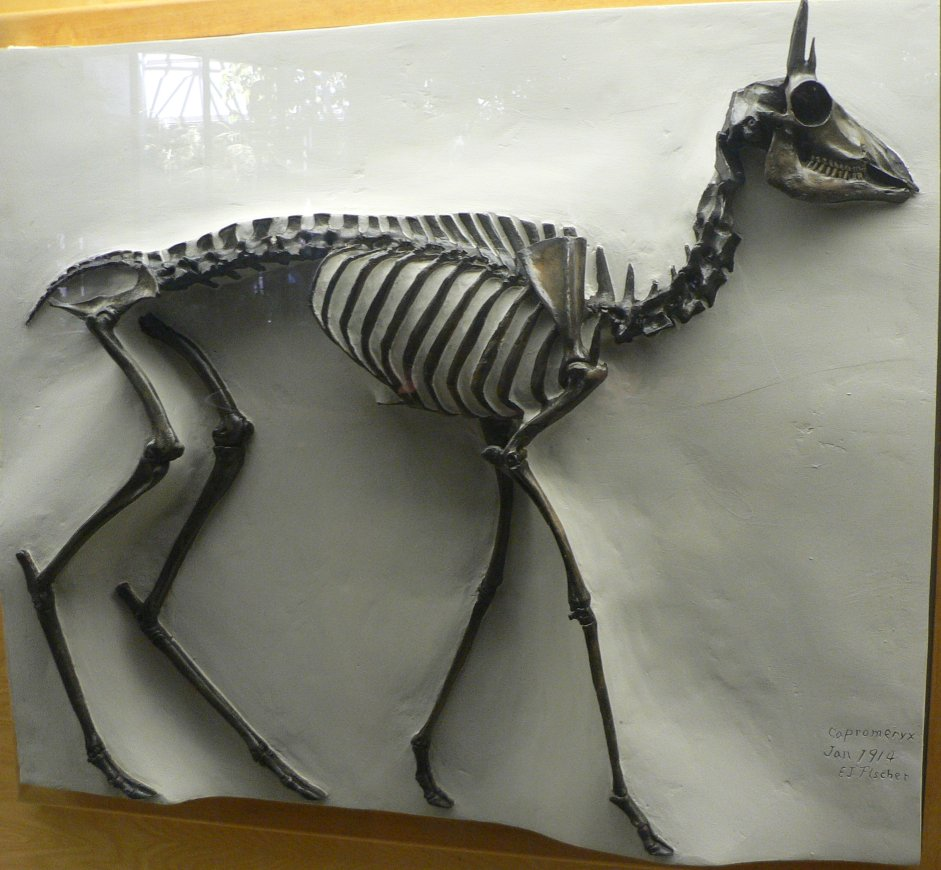
  - Fossilized skeleton of the Pleistocene dwarf pronghorn Capromeryx
    †Capromeryx minor
- Caracara
  - †Caracara cheriway
  - †Caracara plancus
- Carcharhinus
- Carcharias
- Carcharodon
  - †Carcharodon carcharias
  - †Carcharodon hastalis
- Carpelimus
- †Carpocyon
- Carya
- Caryophyllia
- Cassidulina
- Castanea
- Castanopsis
- Castor
  - †Castor californicus – or unidentified comparable form
- Cathartes
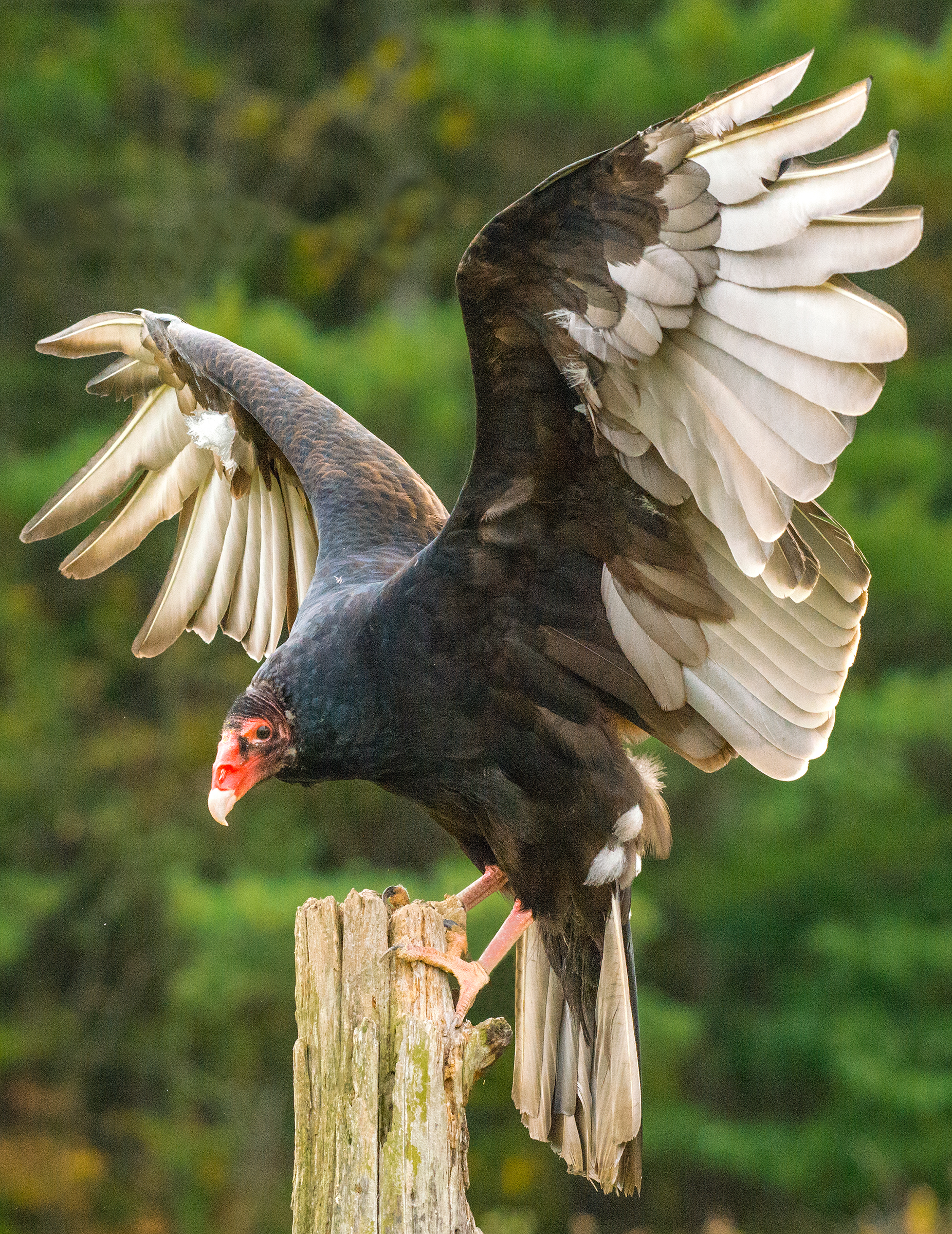
  - A living Cathartes aura, or turkey vulture
    †Cathartes aura
- Catoptrophorus
  - †Catoptrophorus semipalmatus
- †Catostomus
- Ceanothus
- Cedrela
- †Celastrus
- Celtis
- Cepphus
  - †Cepphus columba
- Cercidiphyllum
- †Cercocarpus
- Cerithidea
  - †Cerithidea californica
- Cerithiopsis
- Cerithium
- †Cernina
- †Cerorhinca
- Cervus
  - †Cervus elaphus
- Cetorhinus
  - †Cetorhinus maximus
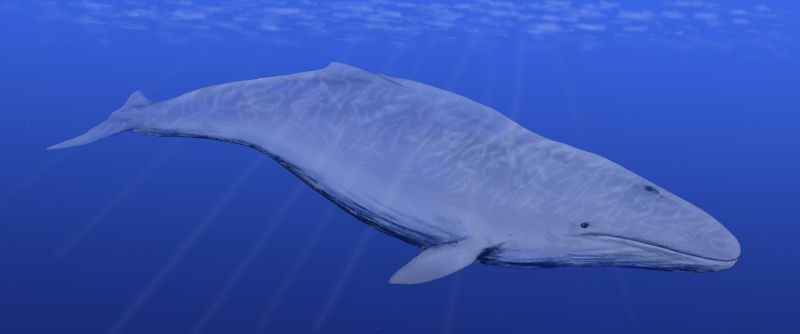
- Life restoration of the Miocene-Pliocene whale Cetotherium
  †Cetotherium
- †Chaenophryne
- Chaetodipus
  - †Chaetodipus formosus – or unidentified comparable form
- †Chalcidichthys – type locality for genus
- Chama
- †Chamaecyparis
- Charadrius
  - †Charadrius semipalmatus
- Chauliodus – type locality for genus
- Chelonia
- Chen
  - †Chen caerulescens
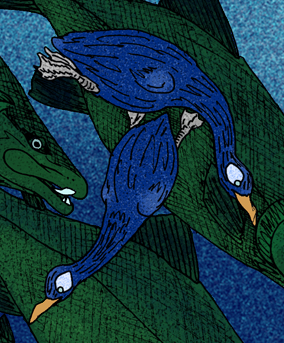
- Life restoration of the Pleistocene-Holocene Chendytes, or Law's diving-goose
  †Chendytes – type locality for genus
  - †Chendytes lawi – type locality for species
- Chione
  - †Chione californiensis
- Chlamys
  - †Chlamys hastata
  - †Chlamys rubida
  - †Chlamys swifti
- Chlorostoma
- †Chorizanthe
- †Chrysobalanus
- †Chrysocyon
- †Chrysodomus – report made of unidentified related form or using admittedly obsolete nomenclature
- †Chrysolepis
- Cibicides
- Cicindela
  - †Cicindela oregona
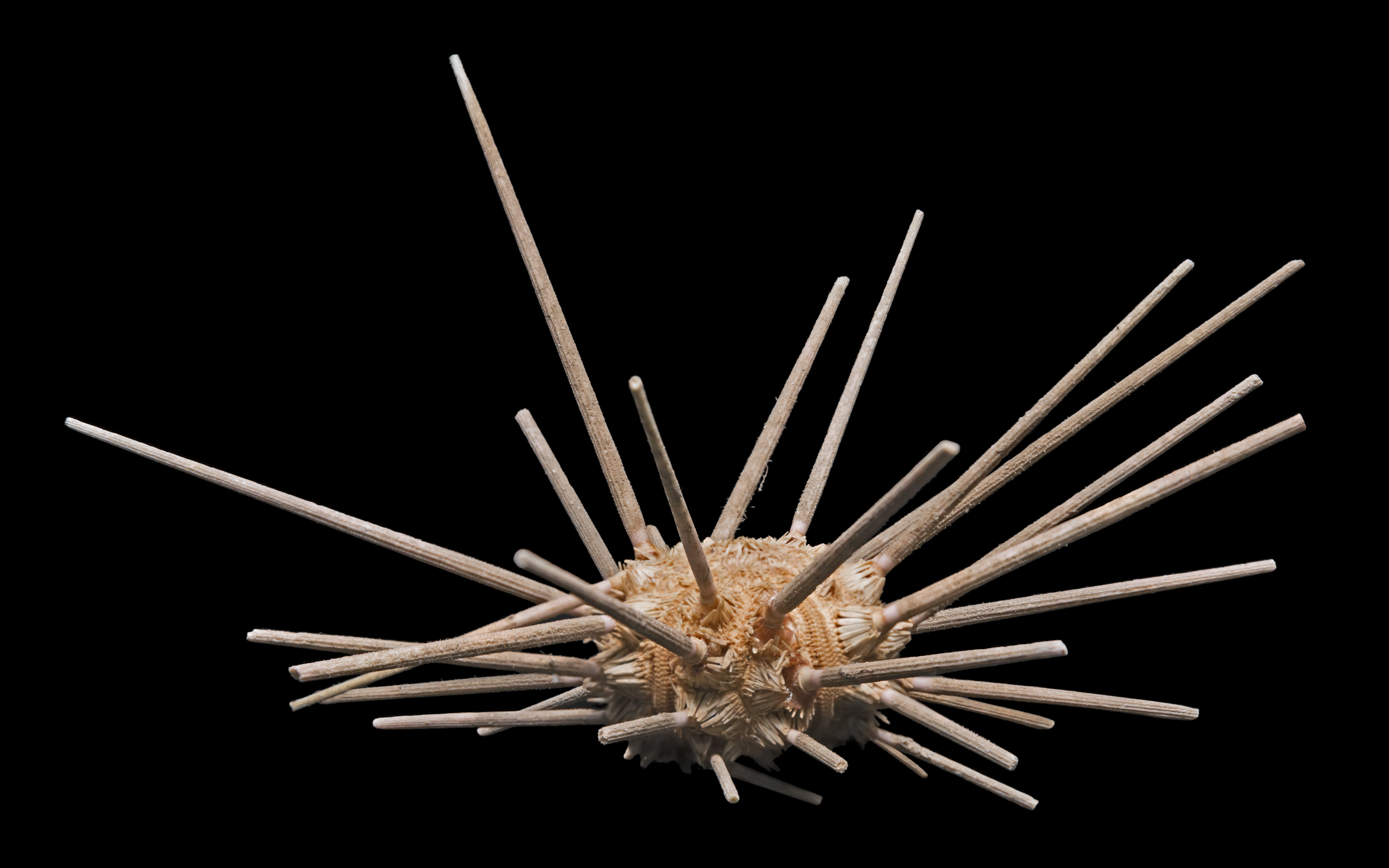
- Shell and spines of a Cidaris sea urchin
  Cidaris
- Cinnamomum
- Cissus
- †Citellus
- Citharichthys
  - †Citharichthys stigmaeus
- Clathrodrillia
- Clathurella
- Clavilithes
- Clavus
- Clementia
- Clethrionomys
- Cletocamptus
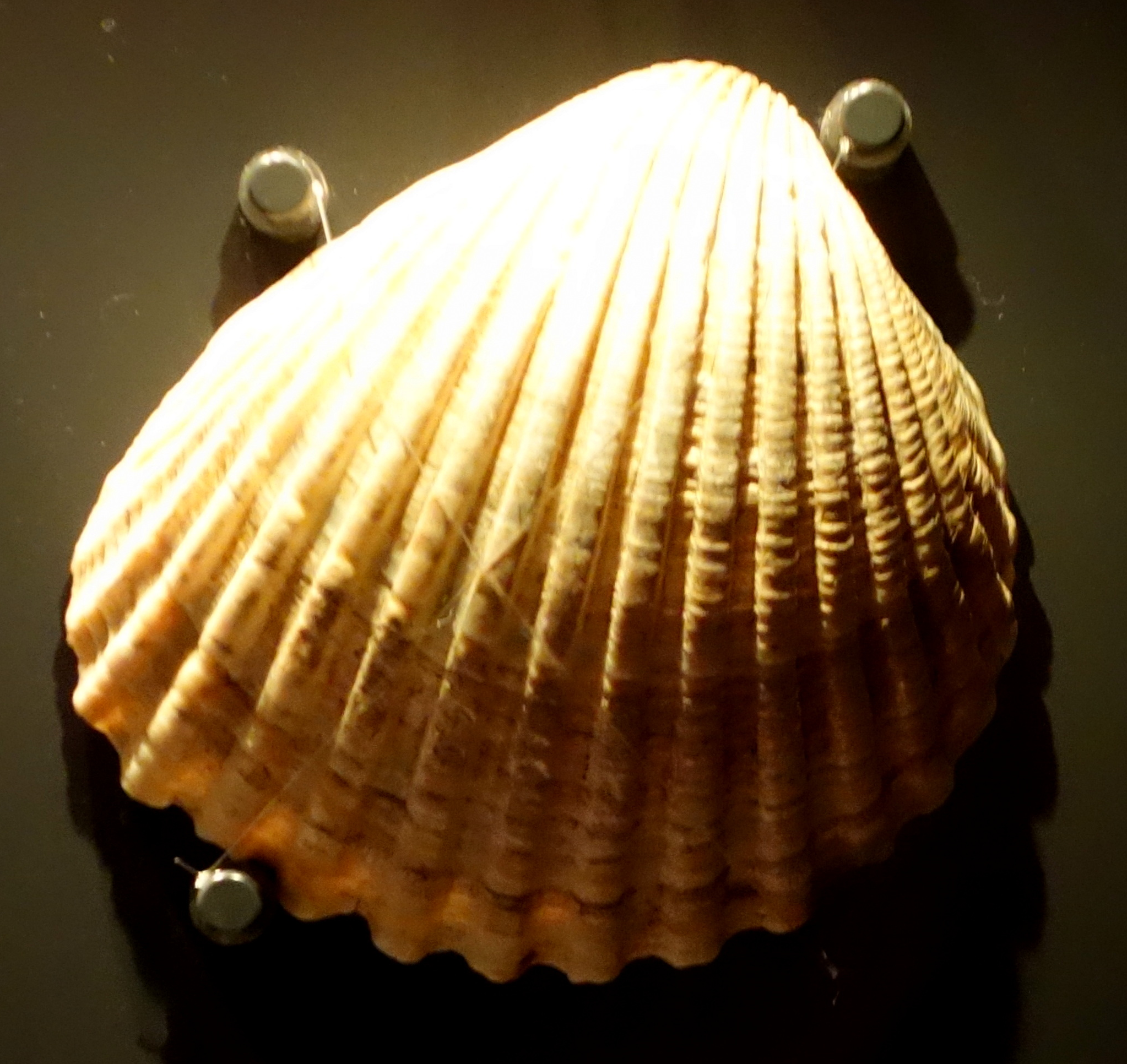
- Shell of a Clinocardium cockle
  Clinocardium
  - †Clinocardium nuttallii
- Cliona
- Clupea
- Clypeaster
- Cnemidophorus
- †Cocconeis
- Cochliomyia – type locality for genus
  - †Cochliomyia macellaria – type locality for species
- Codakia
- Colaptes
- †Colodon
- Coluber
  - †Coluber constrictor
- Colubraria
- Columba – or unidentified comparable form
  - †Columba fasciata
- Columbarium
- †Conasprelloides
- Concavus
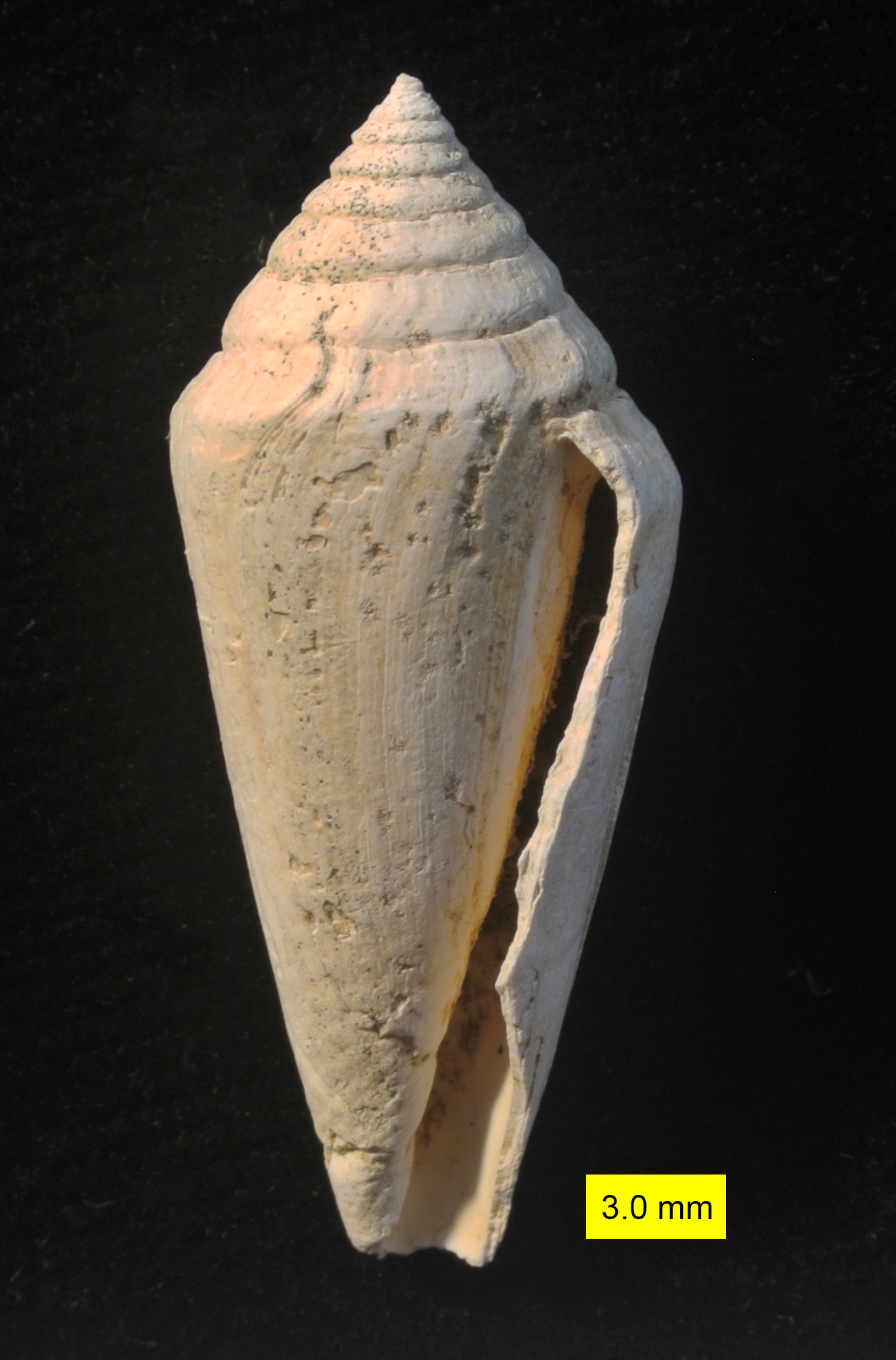
- Fossilized shell of a Conus cone snail
  Conus
  - †Conus fergusoni
  - †Conus regularis
  - †Conus scalaris
- †Cophocetus – tentative report
- Copris
- Coragyps
- Corbicula
- Corbula
- †Cormohipparion
- Cornus
- Coronula – tentative report
- Corvus
  - †Corvus brachyrhynchos
  - †Corvus corax
- †Cosoryx
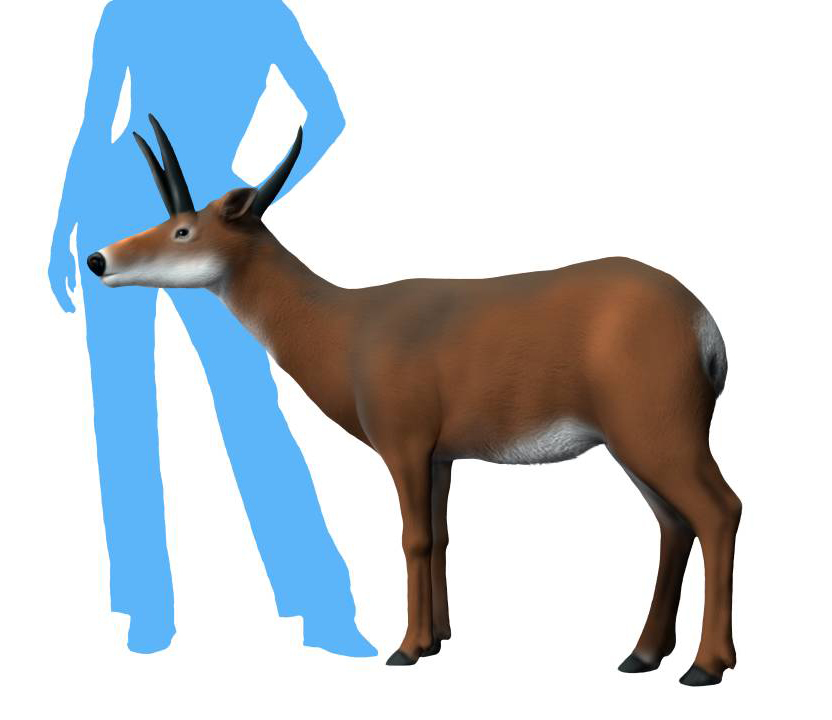
- Restoration of the Miocene palaeomerycid Cranioceras, a relative of modern deer, with anachronistic human to scale
  †Cranioceras
- Crassadoma
  - †Crassadoma gigantea
- Crassispira
  - †Crassispira montereyensis – or unidentified related form
- Crassostrea
  - †Crassostrea ashleyi
  - †Crassostrea titan
- Crataegus
- Crawfordina
- Crepidula
  - †Crepidula adunca
  - †Crepidula onyx
- Crepipatella
  - †Crepipatella lingulata
- †Crommium
- Crossata
  - †Crossata ventricosa
- Crotalus
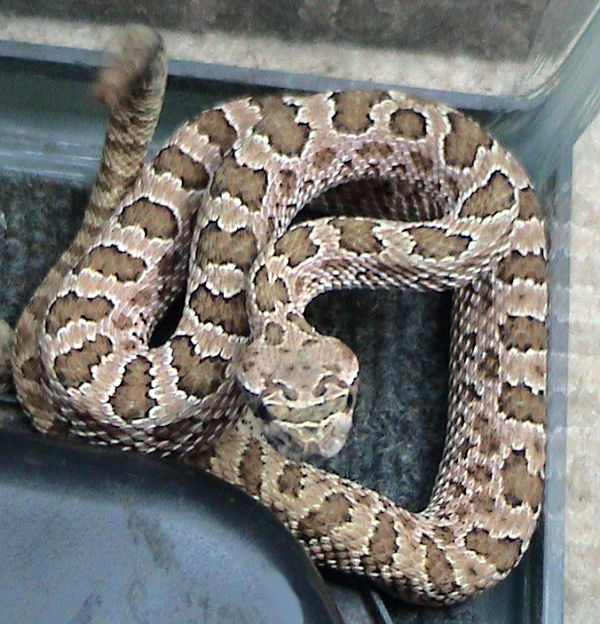
  - A living Crotalus viridis, or prairie rattlesnake
    †Crotalus viridis
- Crucibulum
  - †Crucibulum spinosum
- †Cryptocarya
- Cryptonatica
  - †Cryptonatica affinis
- Cryptotermes
- Cryptotis
- Cucullaea
- Culicoides
- Cumingia
- †Cupania
- †Cupressus
  - †Cupressus goveniana
- Cuspidaria
- †Cuyamacamelus
- Cyanocitta
  - †Cyanocitta stelleri
- Cybocephalus
  - †Cybocephalus californicus – or unidentified comparable form
- Cyclammina
- Cyclocardia
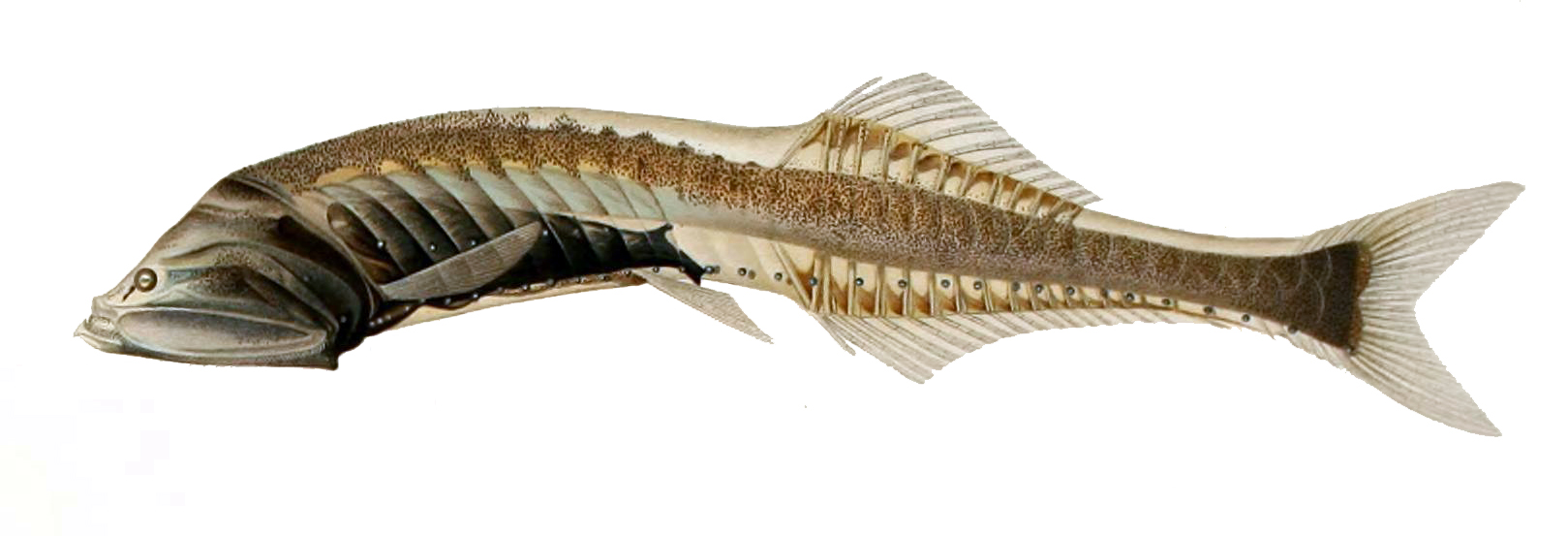
- Illustration of a living Cyclothone bristlemouth
  Cyclothone
- Cygnus
  - †Cygnus columbianus
- Cylichna
- Cymatium
- Cymatogaster
  - †Cymatogaster aggregata
- †Cynarctoides
  - †Cynarctoides acridens
- †Cynarctus
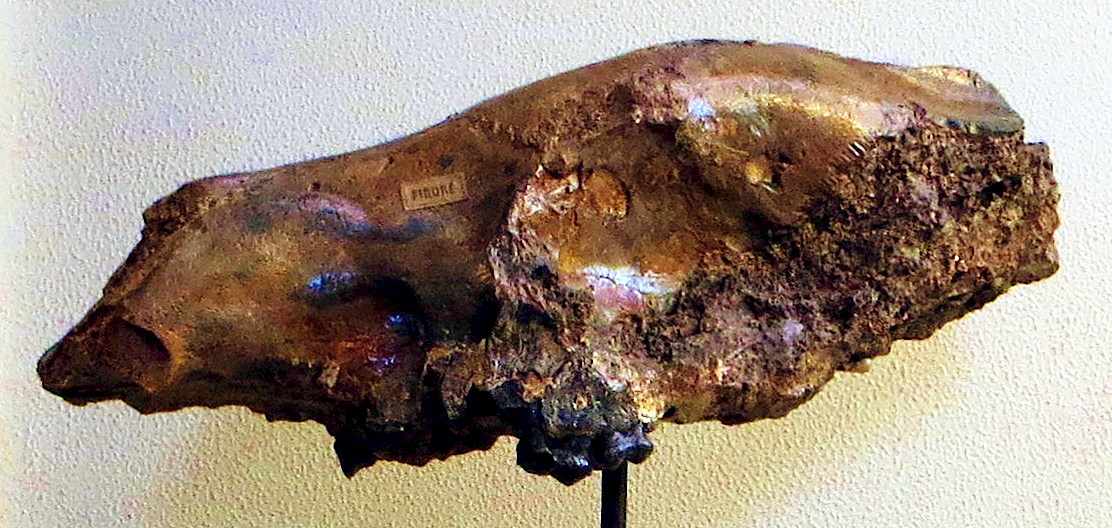
- Fossilized cranium of the Miocene bear-dog Cynelos
  †Cynelos
- Cynoscion
- Cyperus
- Cypraea
- Cyrtonyx
- Cystiscus
- Cythara
- Cytherea
- †Dalbergia
- †Daphoenodon – or unidentified comparable form
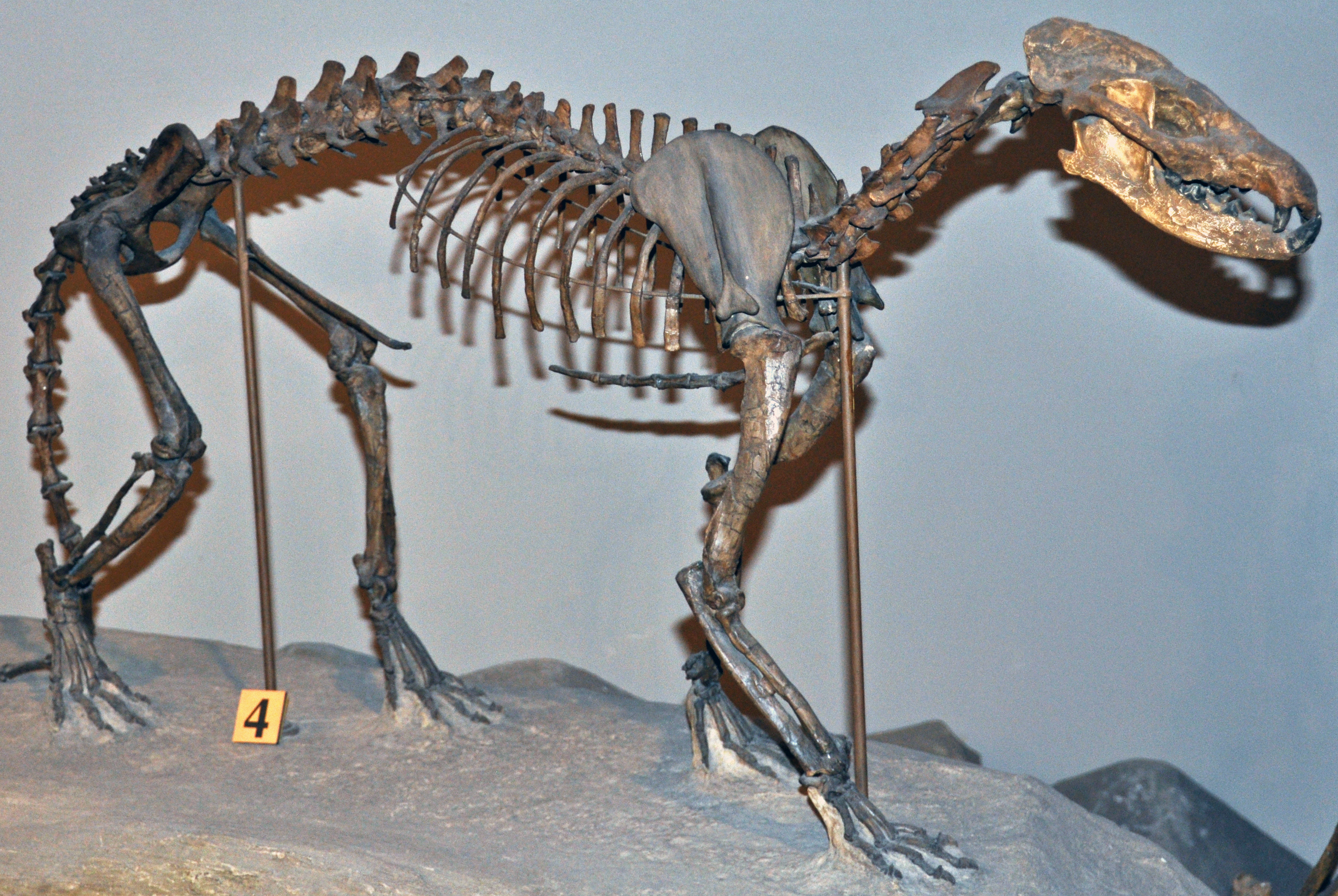
- Mounted fossilized skeleton of the Eocene-Miocene bear-dog Daphoenus
  †Daphoenus
  - †Daphoenus ruber – type locality for species
- Dardanus
  - †Dardanus arrosor
- Dasyatis
- Dasyhelea
- †Decapterus
- Deltochilum – tentative report
- Dendragapus
  - †Dendragapus fuliginosus
  - †Dendragapus obscurus
- Dendraster
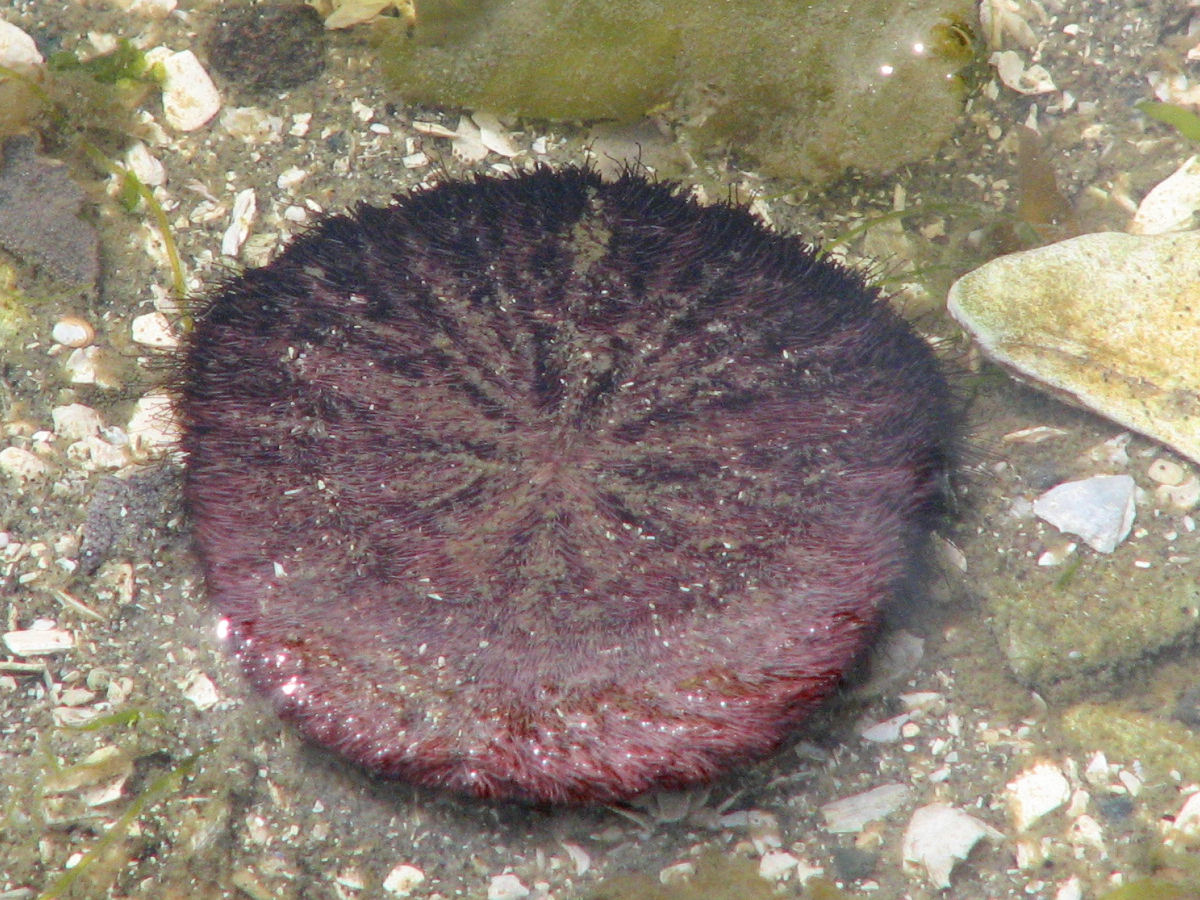
  - A living Dendraster excentricus, or sea cake
    †Dendraster excentricus
- Dendrophyllia
- Dendryphantes
- Dentalium
  - †Dentalium neohexagonum
- Dermochelys – or unidentified related form
- Deroceras
- †Desmatippus
- †Desmatochoerus
- †Desmocyon
- †Desmodium
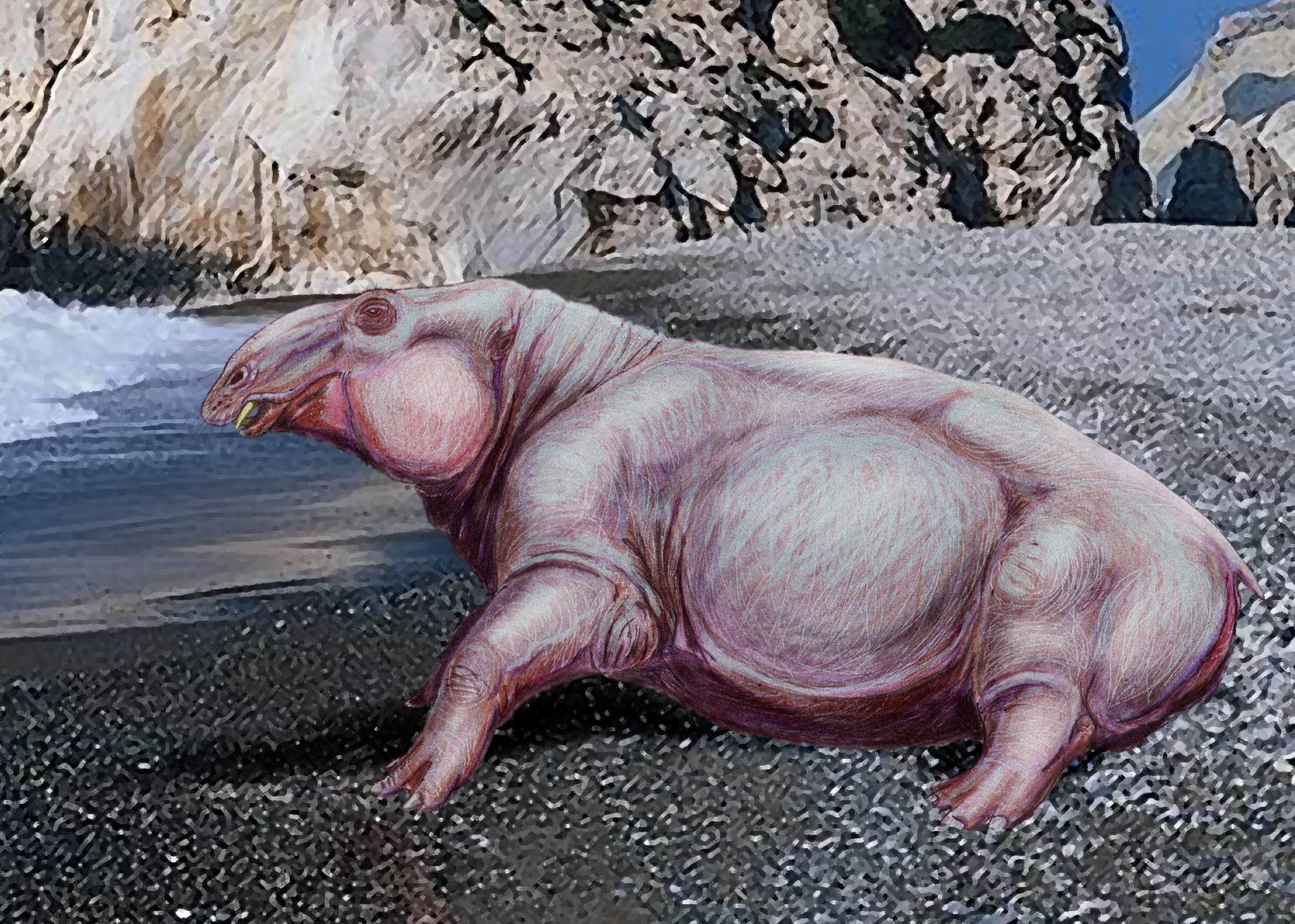
- Life restoration of the Oligocene-Miocene herbivorous marine mammal Desmostylus
  †Desmostylus
  - †Desmostylus hesperus – type locality for species
- Diacria
- †Diceratherium
- Dichocoenia
- †Dinohippus
- †Dinohyus
  - †Dinohyus hollandi
- Diodora
  - †Diodora arnoldi
  - †Diodora aspera
  - †Diodora inaequalis
- Diomedea
- †Diospyros
- Diploria
- Dipodomys
  - †Dipodomys agilis – or unidentified comparable form
  - †Dipodomys compactus
  - †Dipodomys deserti – or unidentified comparable form
  - †Dipodomys heermanni – or unidentified comparable form
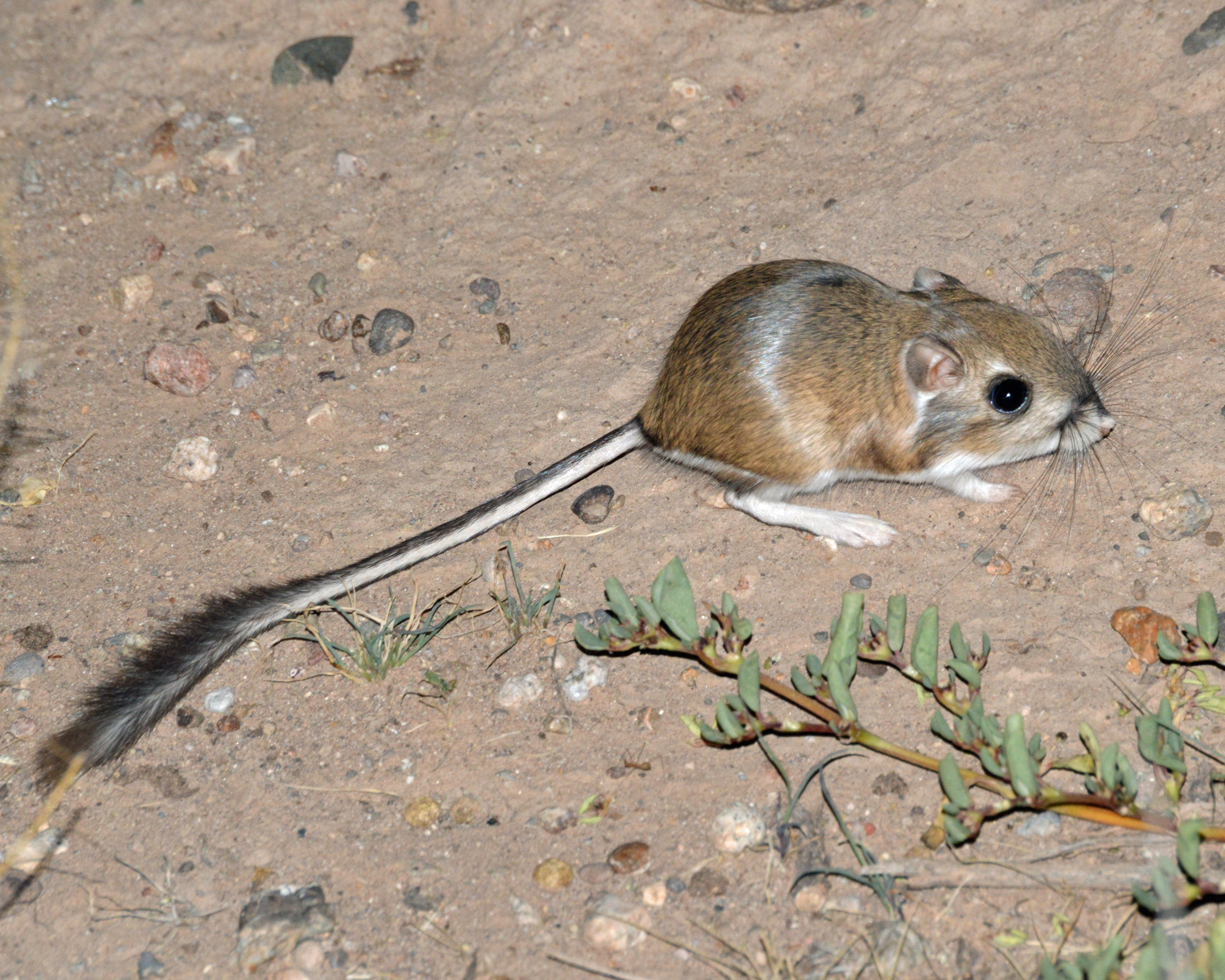
  - A living Dipodomys merriami, or Merriam's kangaroo rat
    †Dipodomys merriami
  - †Dipodomys ordii
- †Dipoides
- †Diprionomys
- Discinisca
- †Discohelix
- †Dissacus
- Distorsio
- †Domnina
- Donax
  - †Donax gouldii
- Dosinia
  - †Dosinia dunkeri
- †Drimys – type locality for genus
- †Dromomeryx
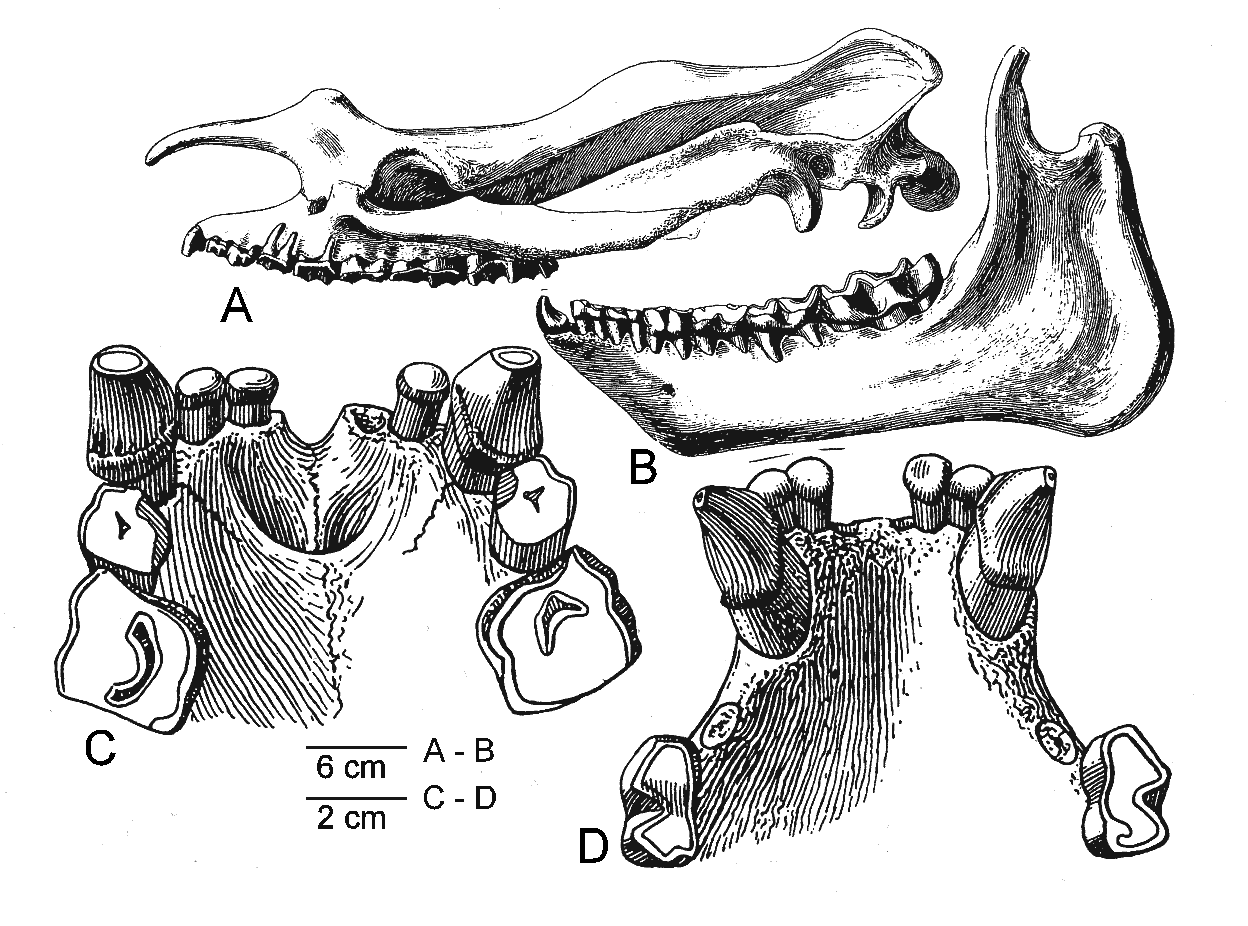
- Illustration of the fossilized jaws and teeth of the Eocene brontothere mammal Duchesneodus
  †Duchesneodus
- †Dusisiren
- Dytiscus
- Echinarachnius
- Echinorhinus
- Eclipes – type locality for genus
- †Ectasis – type locality for genus
- †Ectopistes
  - †Ectopistes migratorius
- Eleodes
  - †Eleodes osculans – type locality for species
- Elgaria
  - †Elgaria multicarinata
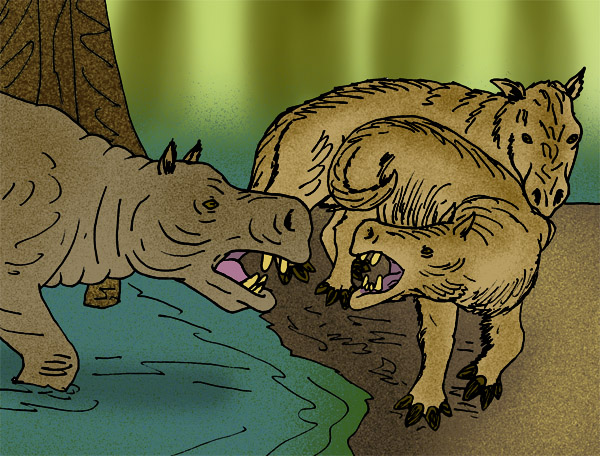
- Life restoration of two of the Eocene-Oligocene anthracothere mammal Elomeryx being menaced by fellow-anthracothere Anthracotherium
  †Elomeryx
- †Enaliarctos
  - †Enaliarctos mealsi
  - †Enaliarctos mitchelli
- †Enallagma – type locality for genus
- Engelhardia
- Engina
- Enhydra
  - †Enhydra lutris
  - †Enhydritherium terraenovae
- Ensis
- Entomobrya
- †Eomellivora
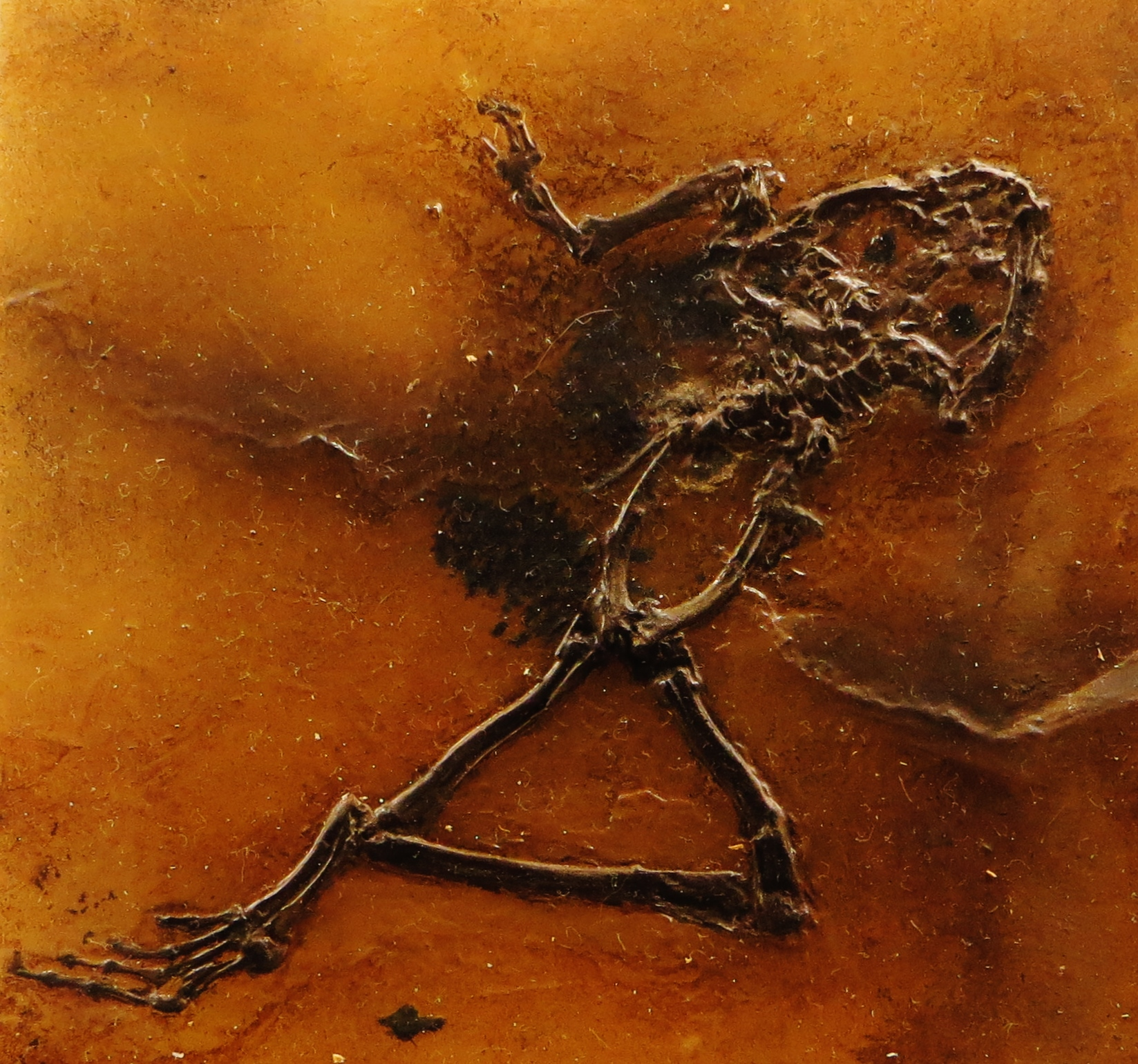
- Fossilized skeleton of the Eocene-Pliocene frog Eopelobates
  †Eopelobates
- †Eosurcula
- †Epicyon
  - †Epicyon haydeni
- †Epihippus
- Epinephelus
- †Epiphragmophora
- Epitonium
- Eptesicus
  - †Eptesicus fuscus – or unidentified comparable form
- †Equisetum
- Equus
  - †Equus idahoensi
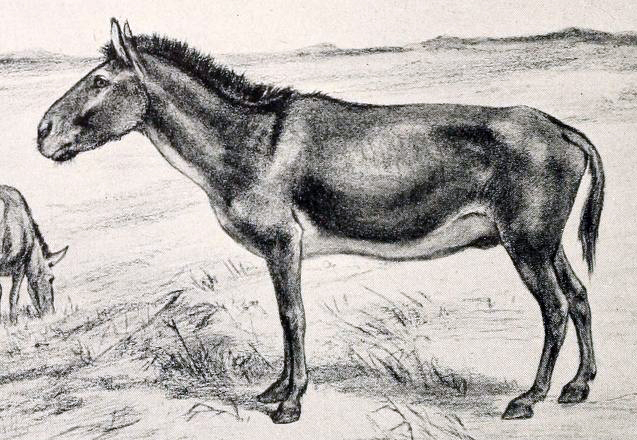
  - Restoration of the Pliocene-Holocene horse Equus scotti, or Scott's horse
    †Equus scotti
  - †Equus simplicidens
- Eremophila
  - †Eremophila alpestris
- Erethizon
  - †Erethizon dorsatum
- †Eriquius
- Eschrichtius
  - †Eschrichtius robustus – or unidentified comparable form
- †Etringus
- Eubalaena – or unidentified comparable form
- †Eucastor
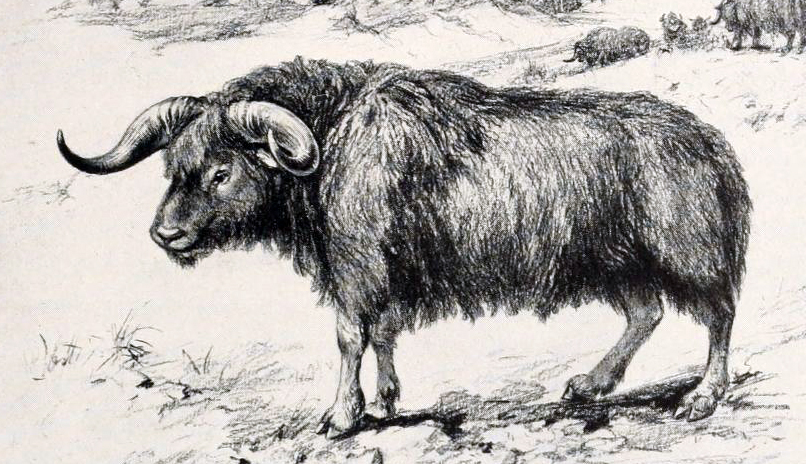
- Life restoration of the Pleistocene bovid Euceratherium, or the shrub ox. Robert Bruce Horsfall (1913).
  †Euceratherium – type locality for genus
  - †Euceratherium collinum – type locality for species
- †Eucyon
  - †Eucyon davisi
- Euleptorhamphus
- Eumetopias
- †Euoplocyon
- Euphagus
  - †Euphagus cyanocephalus
- Euscelis
- Eusmilia
- Euspira
  - †Euspira lewisii
- Eutamias
- †Eutrephoceras
- Euvola
- †Evesthes
- †Exilia
- Falco
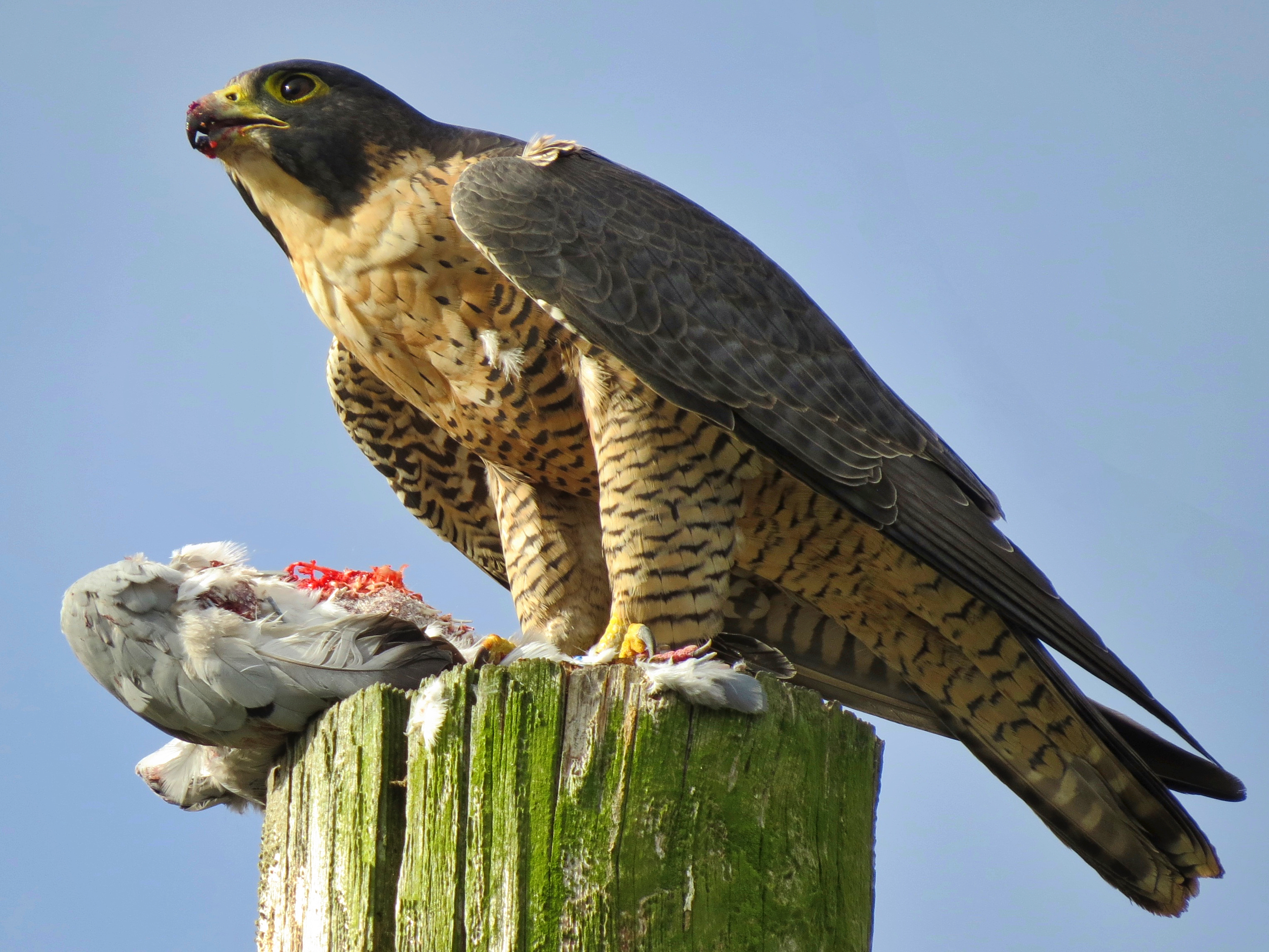
  - A living Falco peregrinus, or peregrine falcon
    †Falco peregrinus
  - †Falco sparverius
- Felis
- †Ficopsis
- Ficus
- Fimbria
- Fissurella
  - †Fissurella volcano
- Flabellipecten
- Flabellum
- †Forestiera
- Forreria
  - †Forreria belcheri
- †Fragilaria
- Fratercula
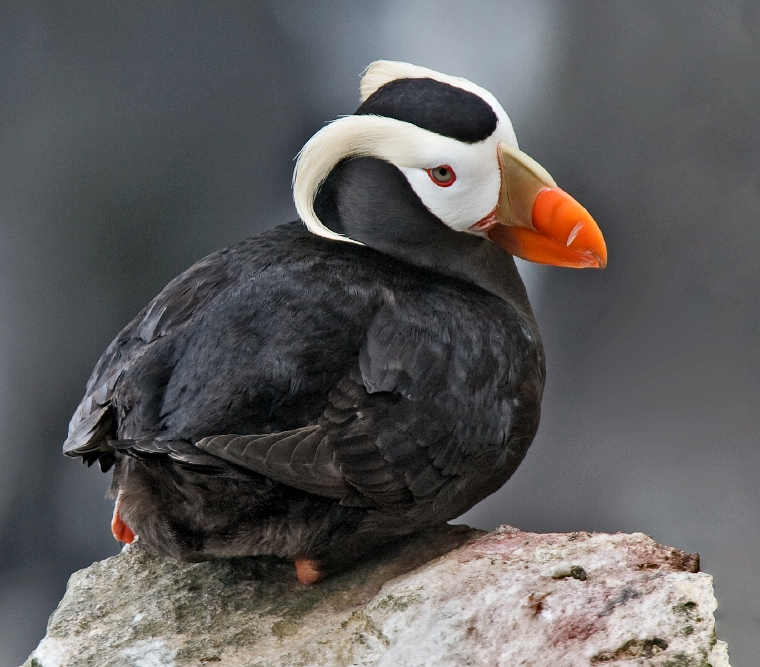
  - A living Fratercula cirrhata, or tufted puffin
    †Fratercula cirrhata
  - †Fratercula dowi – type locality for species
- †Fraxinus
- Fulgoraria
- †Fulica
  - †Fulica americana
- Fulmarus
  - †Fulmarus glacialis
- Fusinus
  - †Fusinus barbarensis
  - †Fusinus luteopictus
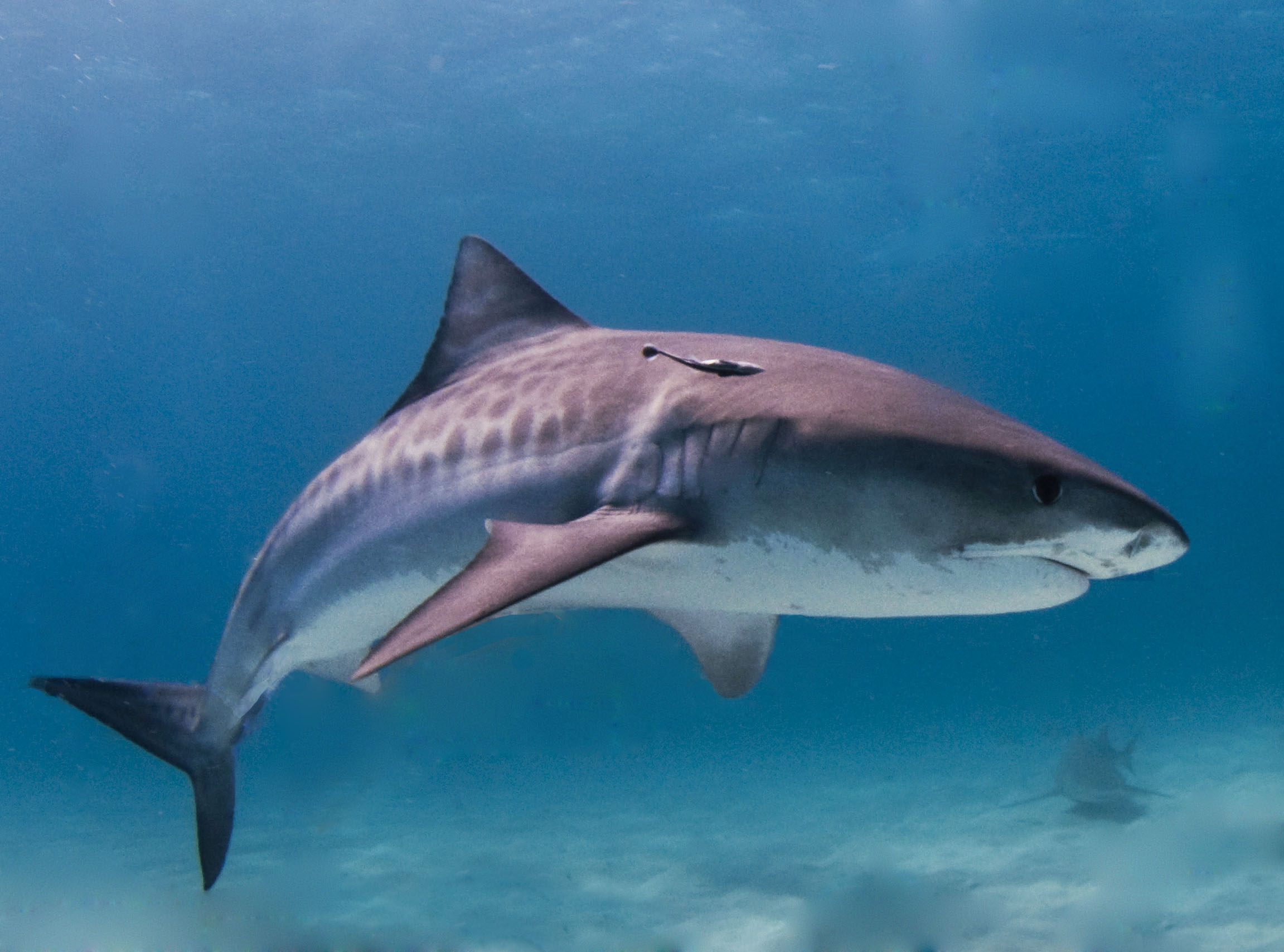
- A living Galeocerdo cuvier, or tiger shark
  Galeocerdo
  - †Galeocerdo aduncus
- Galeodea
- Galeorhinus
- †Ganolytes
- Gari
- Gasterosteus
  - †Gasterosteus aculeatus
- Gastrochaena
- Gavia
  - †Gavia arctica
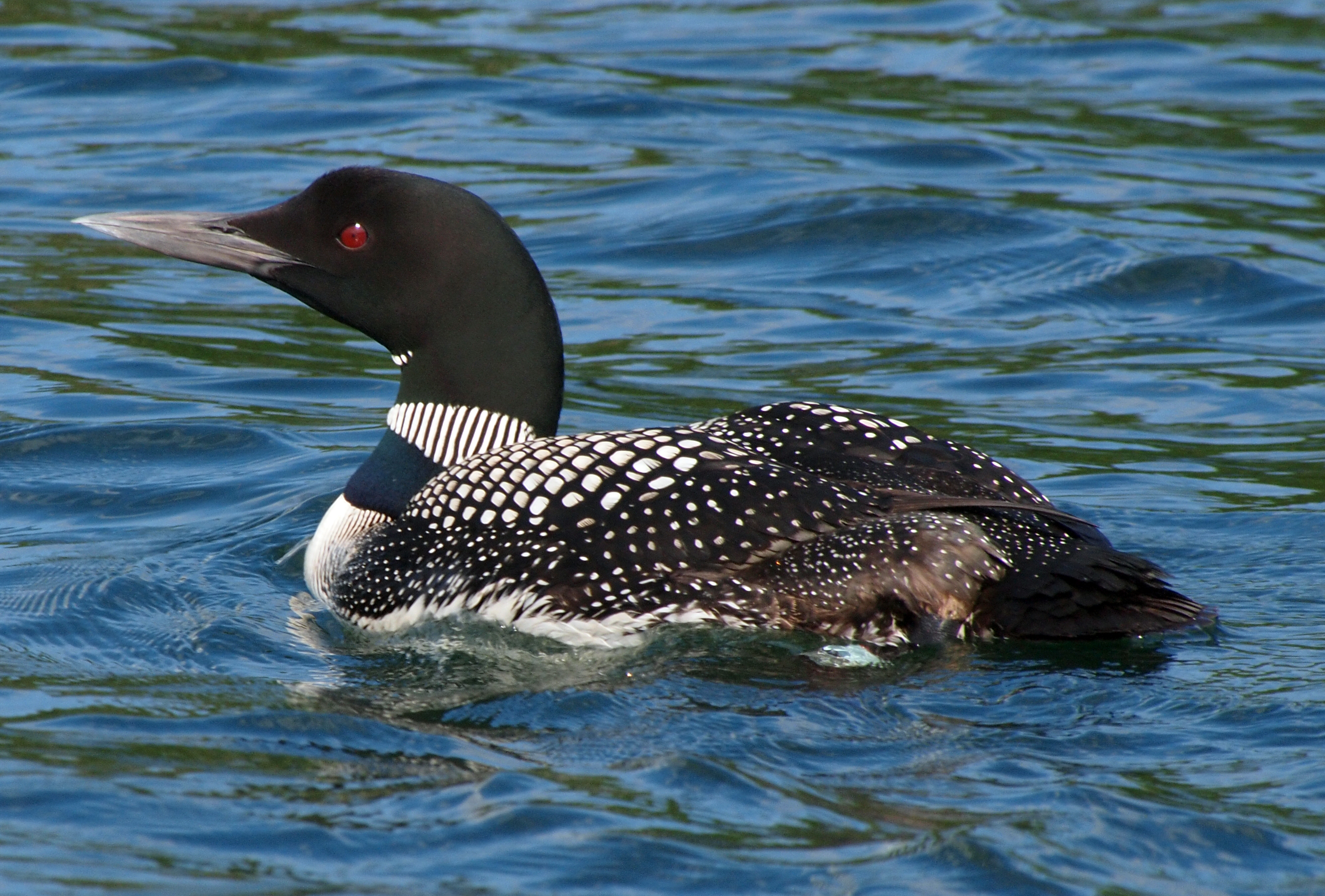
  - A living Gavia immer, or common loon
    †Gavia immer
  - †Gavia pacifica
  - †Gavia stellata
- Gemmula
- Genota
- Genyonemus
  - †Genyonemus lineatus
- Geochelone
- †Geococcyx
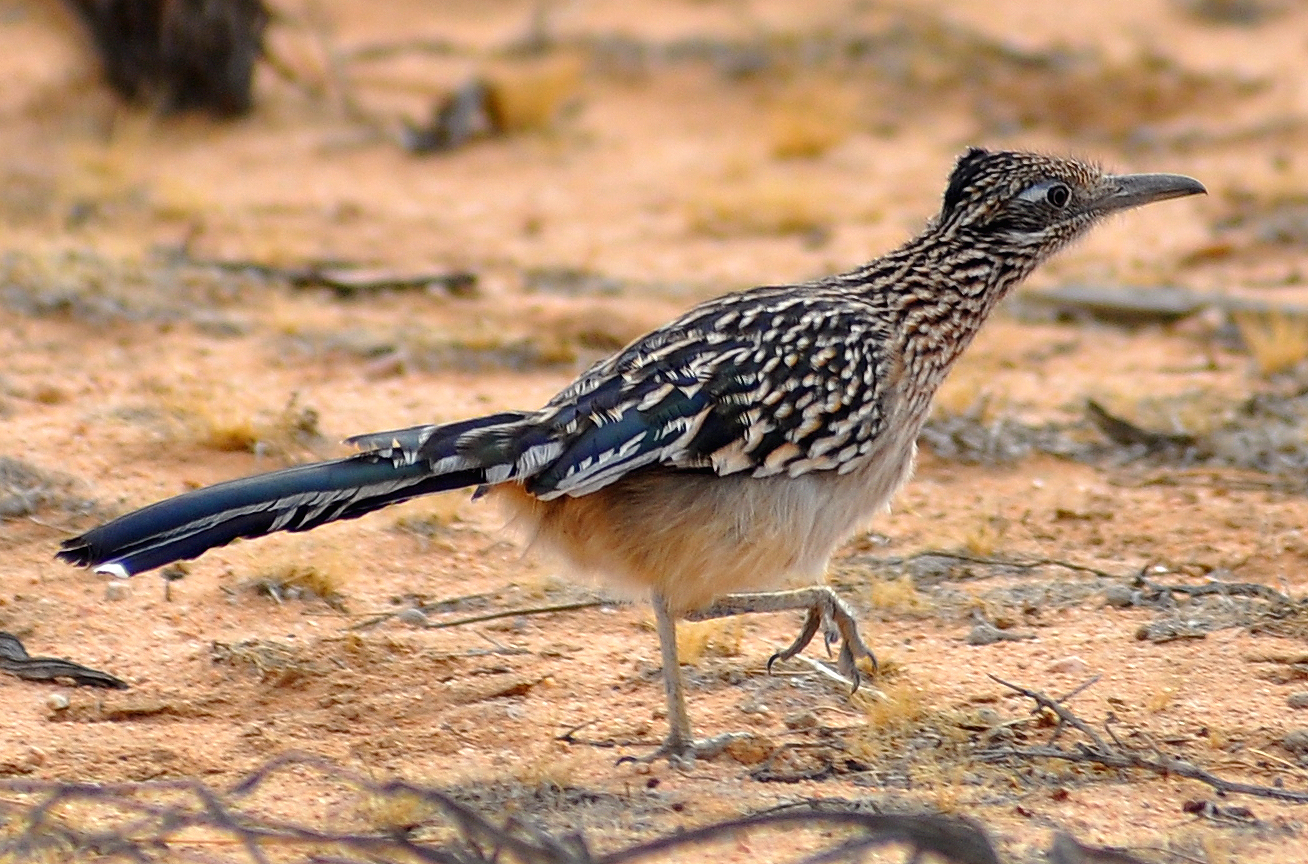
  - A living Geococcyx californianus, or greater roadrunner
    †Geococcyx californianus
- Geomys
- Geranoaetus
- Gerrhonotus
- †Gila – tentative report
- †Gilbertia
- Glans
- Glaucidium
  - †Glaucidium gnoma
- Glebocarcinus
- Globigerina
  - †Globigerina bulloides
- Globularia
- Glossus
- Glycimeris
- Glycymeris
- Glyptoactis
- Glyptostrobus
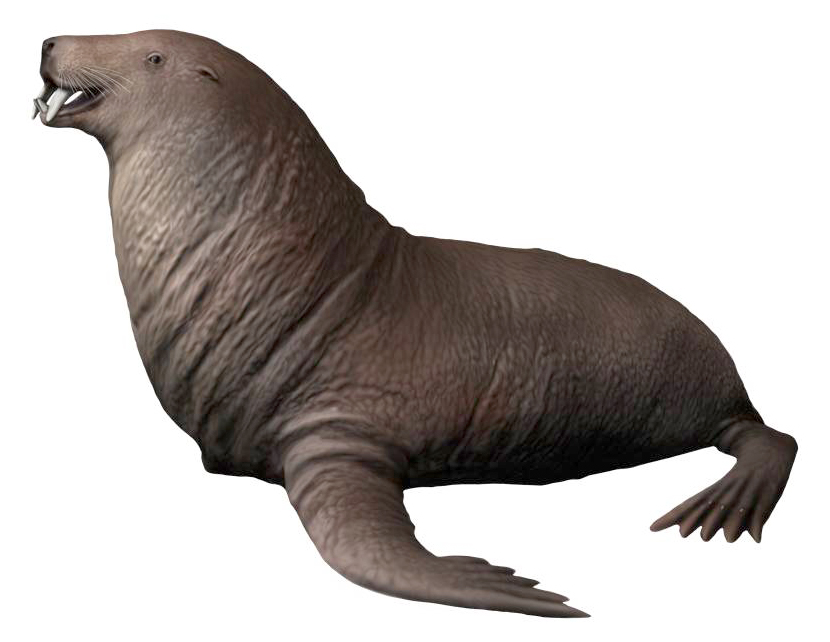
- Life restoration of the Miocene walrus Gomphotaria
  †Gomphotaria – type locality for genus
  - †Gomphotaria pugnax – type locality for species
- †Gomphotherium
- †Goniobasis – tentative report
- Goniopora
- Gopherus
  - †Gopherus agassizii
- †Gordonia
- Granulina
- Gymnogyps
  - †Gymnogyps californianus – type locality for species
- Gyroidina
- Haliaeetus
  - †Haliaeetus leucocephalus
- †Haliaetus
- Haminoea
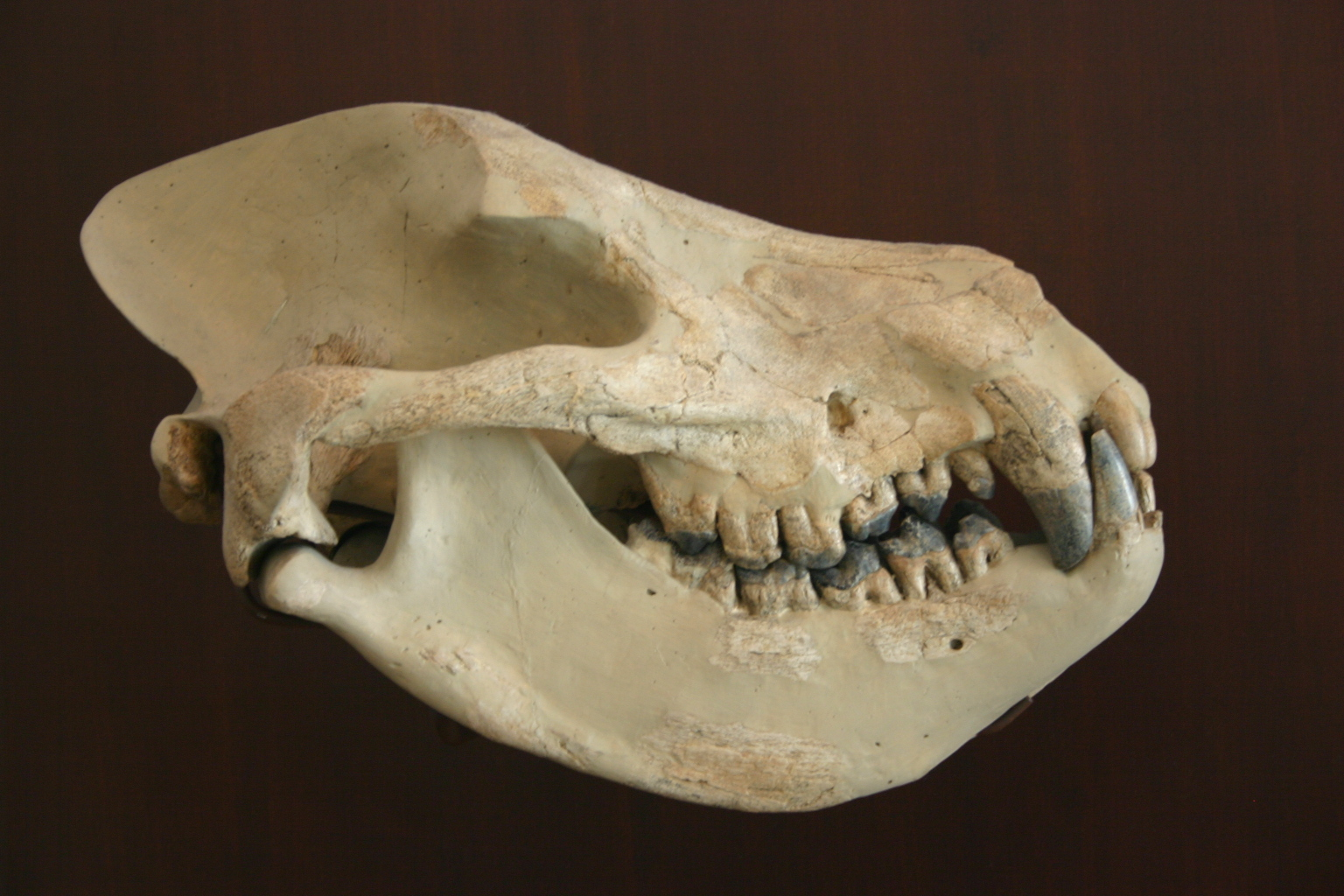
- Fossilized skull of the mesonychian mammal Harpagolestes
  †Harpagolestes – or unidentified comparable form
- Heloderma
- †Hemiauchenia
  - †Hemiauchenia macrocephala
- Hemipristis
  - †Hemipristis serra
- Hemitelia
- Hemitoma
- Here
- †Herpetocetus
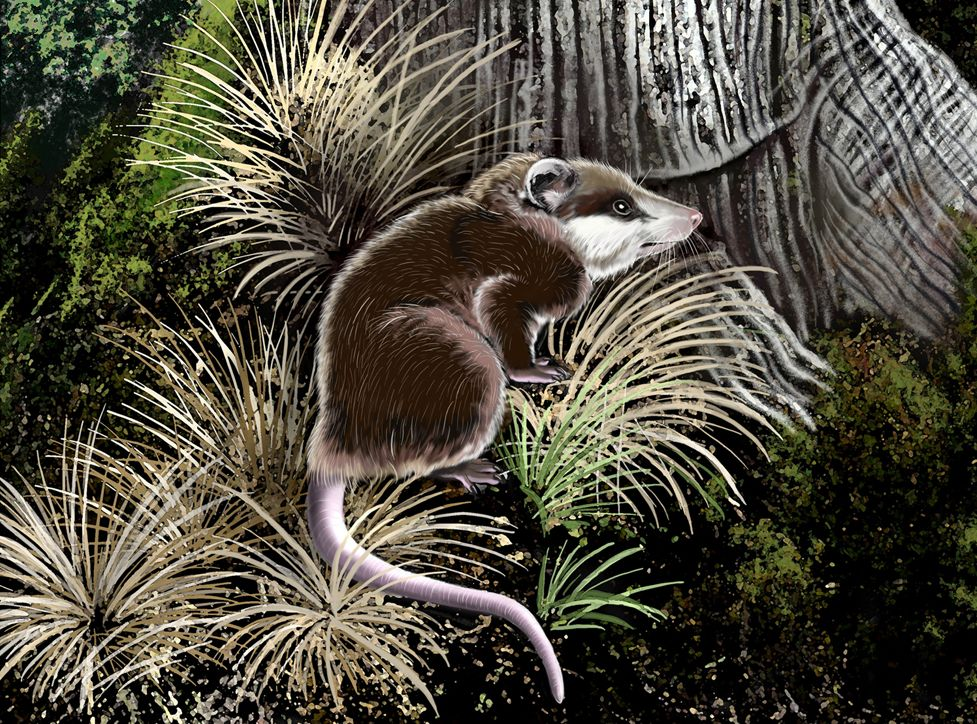
- Life restoration of the Eocene-Miocene mammal Herpetotherium
  †Herpetotherium
  - †Herpetotherium knighti – or unidentified comparable form
- Hespererato
  - †Hespererato columbella
- †Hesperocamelus – or unidentified comparable form
- Hesperomys
- †Hesperotestudo
- Heterodontus
- Hexagrammos
- Hexanchus
- Hiatella
  - †Hiatella arctica
- †Hiltonius
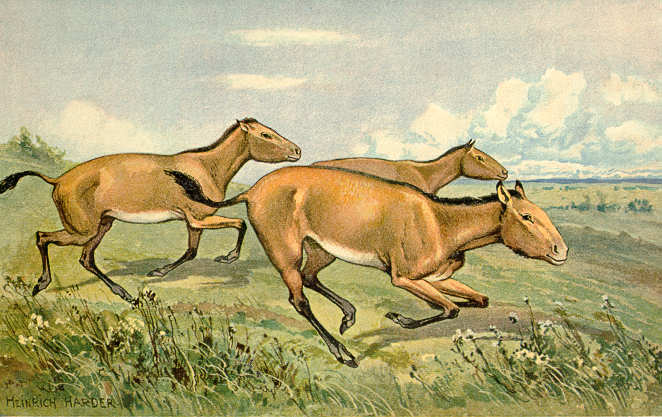
- Life restoration of a herd of the Miocene-Pleistocene horse Hipparion. Heinrich Harder (1920).
  †Hipparion
  - †Hipparion forcei
- †Hippidion
- Hipponix
- †Hipponoe
- †Hippotherium
- Histrionicus
  - †Histrionicus histrionicus – tentative report
- Hodomys
- Homalopoma
- Homo
  - †Homo sapiens
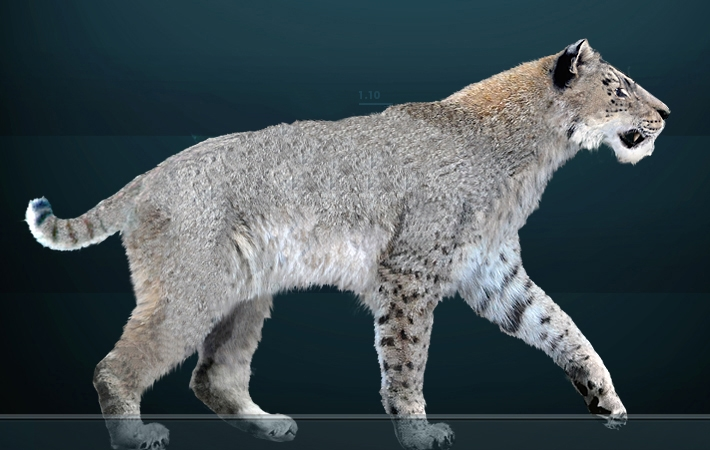
- Restoration of Pliocene-Pleistocene Homotherium, or scimitar cat
  †Homotherium
  - †Homotherium serum – or unidentified comparable form
- †Hoplophoneus
- †Hyaenodon
  - †Hyaenodon venturae
  - †Hyaenodon vetus – type locality for species
- Hyalina
- Hydrangea
- †Hydrodamalis
  - †Hydrodamalis cuestae – type locality for species
  - †Hydrodamalis gigas
- Hydrophilus
- Hyla
- †Hyopsodus – or unidentified comparable form
- †Hyperbaena
- †Hypertragulus
- †Hypohippus
- †Hypolagus
- †Hyrachyus
- †Ilingoceros
- †Imagotaria – type locality for genus
  - †Imagotaria downsi – type locality for species
- †Indarctos
- †Inga
- †Ioscion
- Ischnochiton
- †Ischyrocyon
- †Ischyromys
- Isognomon
- Isurus
  - †Isurus oxyrinchus
  - †Isurus planus
- Jaton
- †Julus
- †Juncus
- Juniperus
- Kelletia
  - †Kelletia kelletii
- Kellia
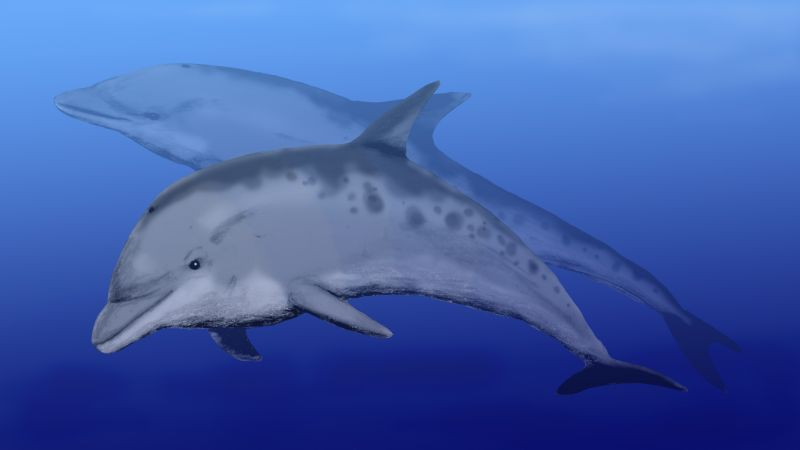
- Life restoration of the Oligocene-Miocene dolphin Kentriodon
  †Kentriodon – type locality for genus
- †Keteleeria
- †Kingena
- Kurtzia
  - †Kurtzia arteaga
- Kurtziella
  - †Kurtziella plumbea
- †Labyrinthus
- Lacuna
  - †Lacuna porrecta
  - †Lacuna unifasciata
- †Lacunaria
- Laevicardium
  - †Laevicardium elatum
- Lagena
- Lamna
- Lampanyctus
- †Lampris – type locality for genus
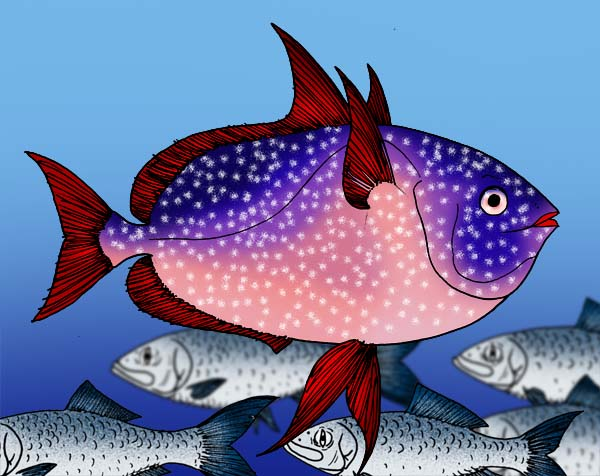
  - Life restoration of the Miocene opah fish Lampris zatima
    †Lampris zatima – type locality for species
- Lampropeltis
  - †Lampropeltis getulus
- Larus
  - †Larus californicus
  - †Larus delawarensis
  - †Larus glaucescens
  - †Larus philadelphia
- Latirus
- †Laytonia – type locality for genus
- Lechytia
- Leda
- Lepeta
- Lepidochitona
- Lepisosteus
  - †Lepisosteus spatula – or unidentified comparable form
- †Leptacanthichthys
  - †Leptacanthichthys gracilispinis
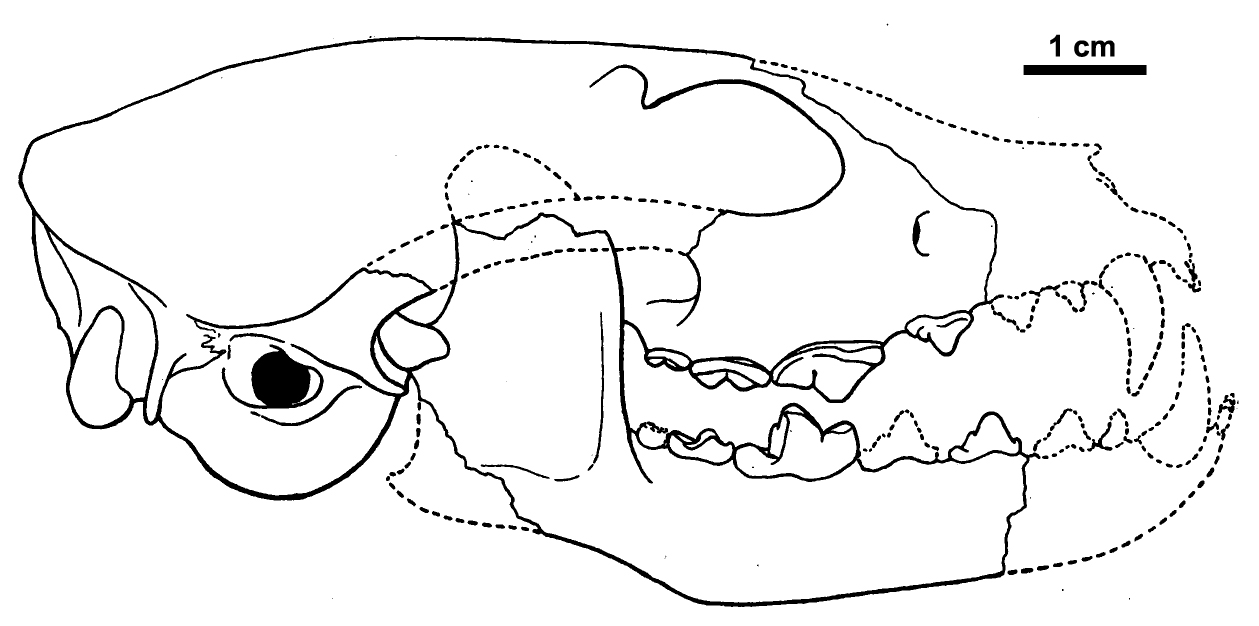
- Illustration of a fossilized skull of the Oligocene-Miocene dog Leptocyon
  †Leptocyon
- †Leptomeryx
  - †Leptopecten latiauratus
- †Leptoreodon
- Lepus
  - †Lepus americanus
  - †Lepus californicus
  - †Lepus callotis
- Leukoma
  - †Leukoma staminea
- Lima
- Limaria
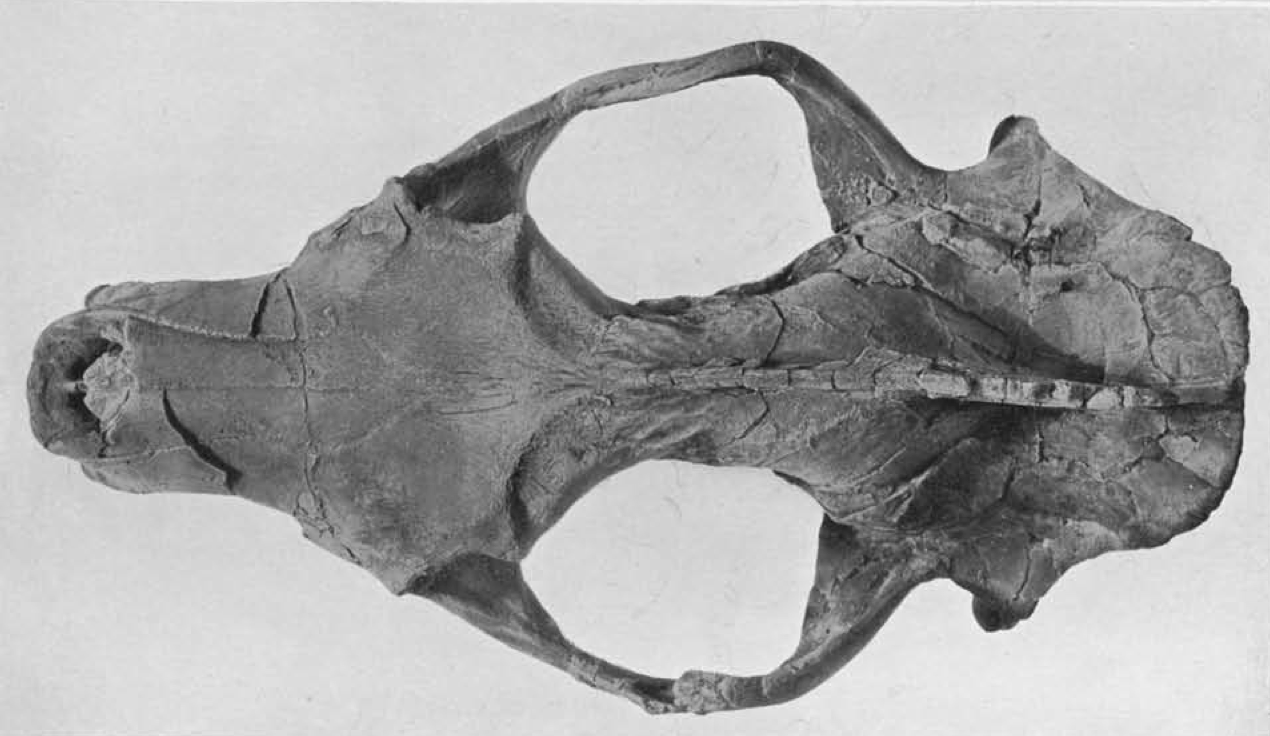
- Top view of a fossilized skull of the Eocene creodont mammal Limnocyon
  †Limnocyon
- †Limosa
  - †Limosa fedoa
- Linga
- †Linophryne
  - †Linophryne indica
- †Liolithax – type locality for genus
- Liquidambar
- †Lirosceles
- Lirularia
  - †Lirularia lirulata
- Lissodelphis – or unidentified comparable form
- †Lithocarpus
- Lithophaga
- Lithophyllum
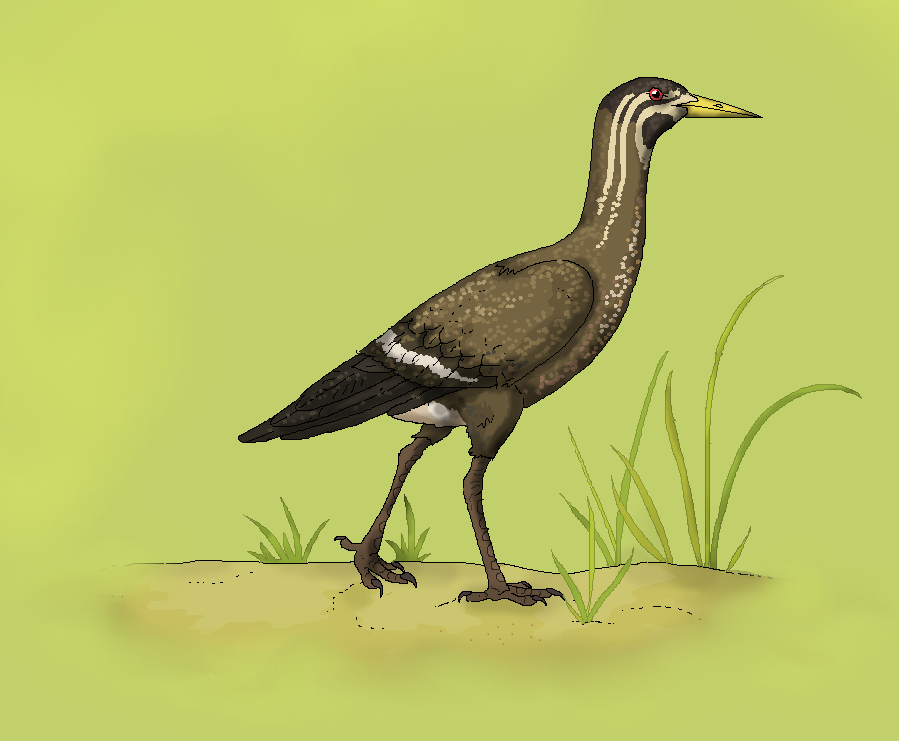
- Life restoration of the Paleocene-Eocene bird Lithornis
  †Lithornis – or unidentified comparable form
- Lithothamnion
- Littorina
  - †Littorina scutulata
- †Lompoquia – type locality for genus
- Lontra
  - †Lontra canadensis
- †Lophar – type locality for genus
- †Lophocetus
- †Lophortyx
- †Lora
- Lottia
  - †Lottia limatula
  - †Lottia scabra
- Lucapinella
  - †Lucapinella callomarginata
- Lucina
- Luidia
- †Lycophocyon – type locality for genus
  - †Lycophocyon hutchisoni – type locality for species
- †Lygisma – type locality for genus
- Lygodium
- Lynx
  - †Lynx rufus
- Lyonsia
- Lyria
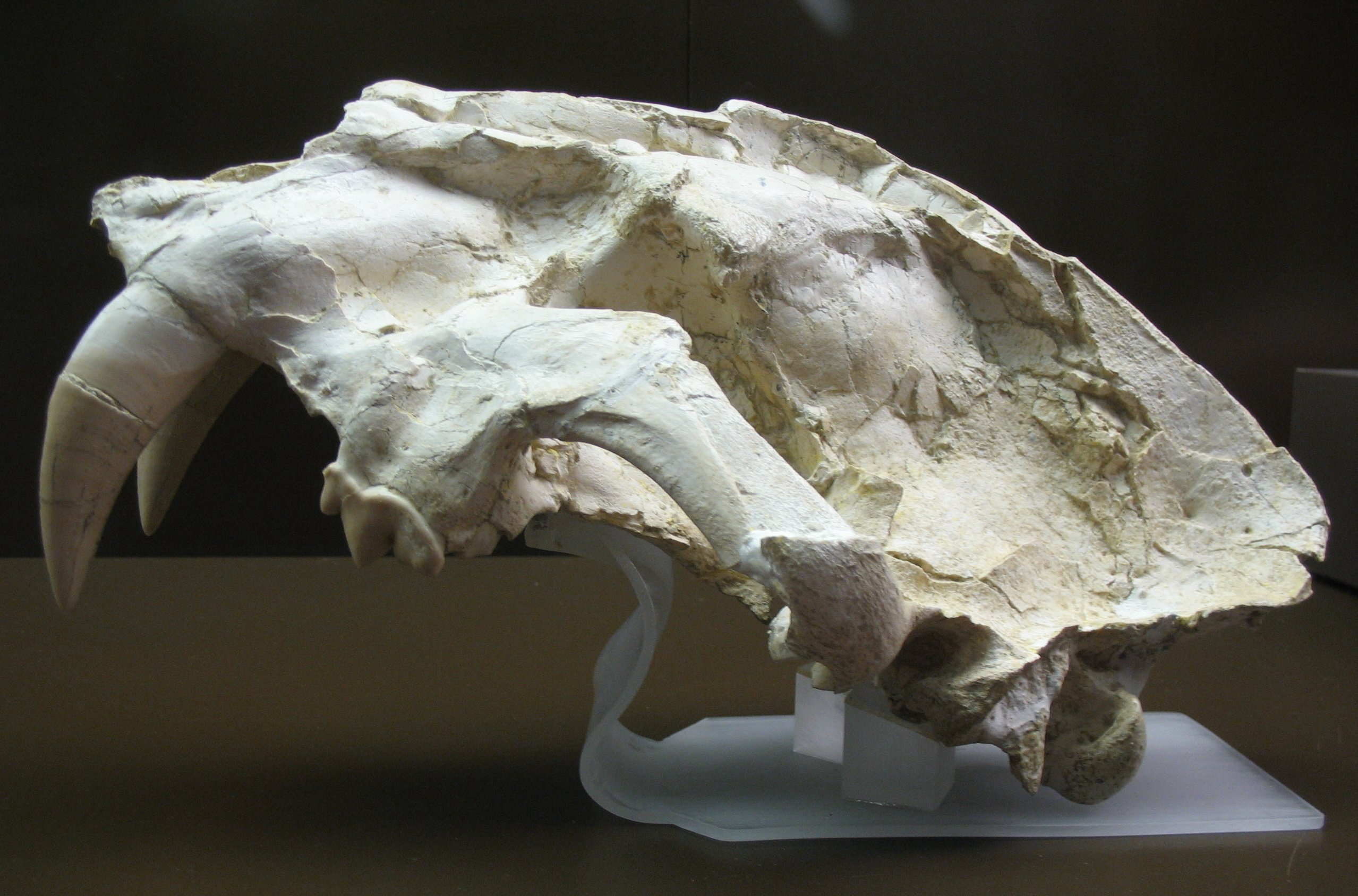
- Fossilized cranium of the Miocene-Pleistocene saber-toothed cat Machairodus
  †Machairodus
- Macoma
  - †Macoma nasuta
- Macrarene
- Macrocallista
- †Macrodelphinus – type locality for genus
- Madrepora
- Magnolia
- Mahonia
- Makaira
- Malea
  - †Malea ringens
- Mallotus
- †Mammut
  - †Mammut americanum
  - †Mammut cosoensis
  - †Mammut matthewi
- †Mammuthus
  - †Mammuthus columbi
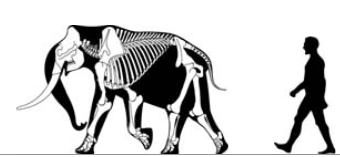
  - Reconstructive illustration of the skeleton of a Mammuthus exilis, or pygmy mammoth
    †Mammuthus exilis
  - †Mammuthus primigenius
- †Mancalla – type locality for genus
  - †Mancalla californiensis – type locality for species
- †Mangelia
- Margarites
  - †Margarites pupillus
- Marginella
- Marmota
- Martes
- Martesia
- Maxwellia
  - †Maxwellia gemma
- †Mayena – tentative report
- †Mediochoerus
- †Megacamelus
- Megachasma
- Megachile
  - †Megachile gentilis
- †Megahippus
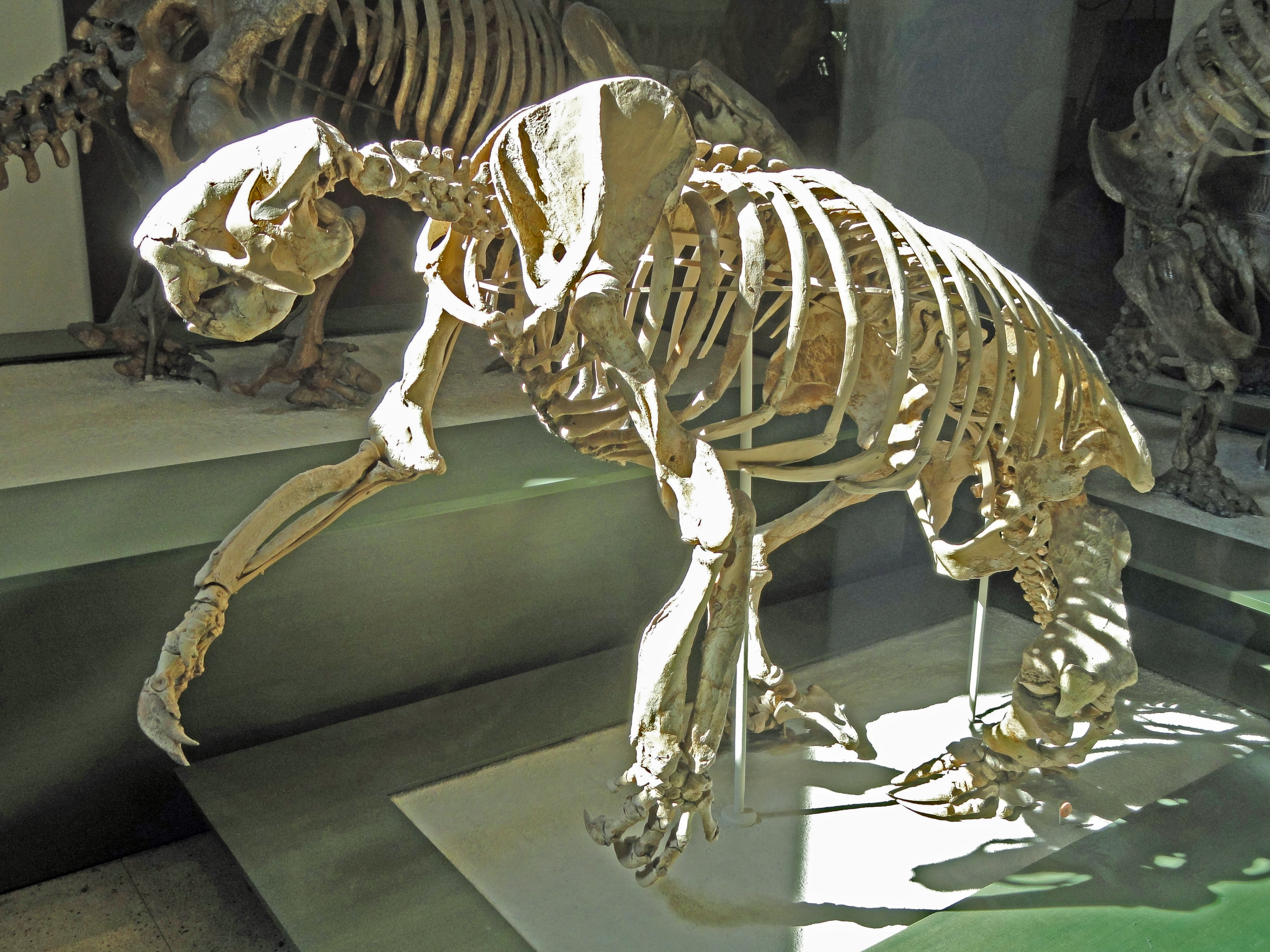
- Mounted fossilized skeleton of the Miocene-Pleistocene ground sloth Megalonyx
  †Megalonyx
  - †Megalonyx jeffersonii
  - †Megalonyx wheatleyi
- Megalops – tentative report
- †Megapaloelodus
- Megaptera
- Megathura – tentative report
- †Megatylopus
- Melampus
- Melanella
- Melanitta
  - †Melanitta deglandi – tentative report
  - †Melanitta fusca
  - †Melanitta perspicillata
- Melanoplus
  - †Melanoplus differentialis
- Meleagris
- †Meliosma
- Melospiza
  - †Melospiza melodia
- †Meniscotherium
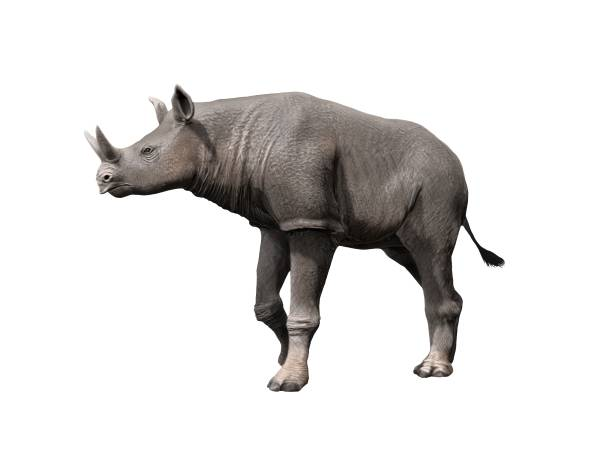
- Life restoration of the Miocene rhinoceros Menoceras
  †Menoceras
- Mephitis
  - †Mephitis mephitis
- Meretrix
- Mergus
  - †Mergus serrator
- Merluccius
  - †Merluccius productus
- †Merriamoceros
- †Merychippus
- †Merychyus
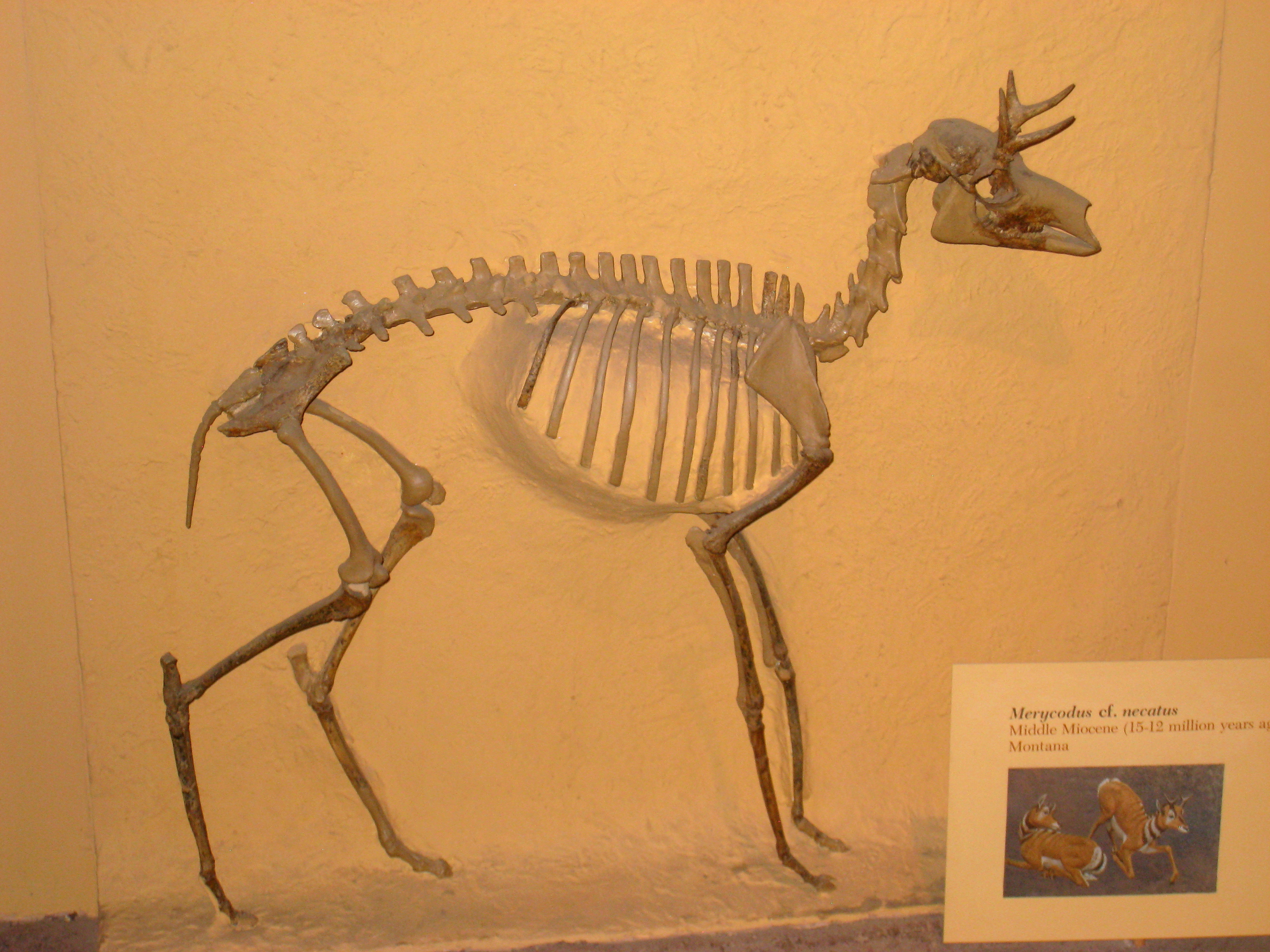
- Fossilized skeleton of the Miocene pronghorn Merycodus
  †Merycodus
- Mesalia
- †Mesocyon
- †Mesodma – tentative report
- †Mesohippus
- Mesophyllum
- †Mesoreodon
- †Metalopex
- †Metarhinus
- †Metatomarctus
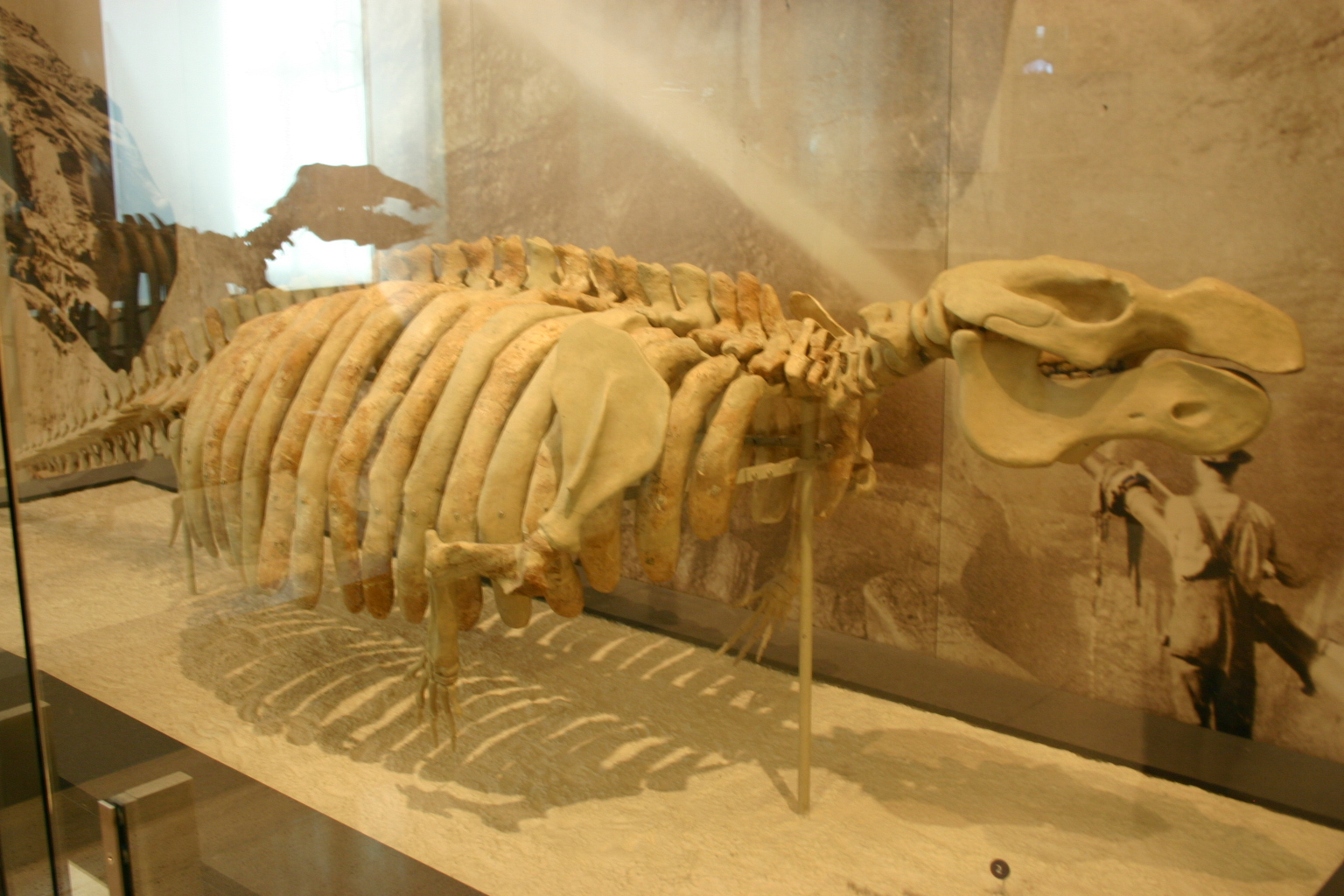
- Mounted fossilized skeleton of the Miocene-Pleistocene manatee relative Metaxytherium
  †Metaxytherium
- †Miacis
- †Michenia
- †Microcosmodon – or unidentified comparable form
- Microdipodops
- Microgadus – tentative report
- †Microsyops
- †Microtomarctus
- Microtus
  - †Microtus californicus
- †Miocryptorhopalum – type locality for genus
- †Miocyon
- †Miohippus
- †Miomancalla
- †Miotapirus
- †Miotylopus
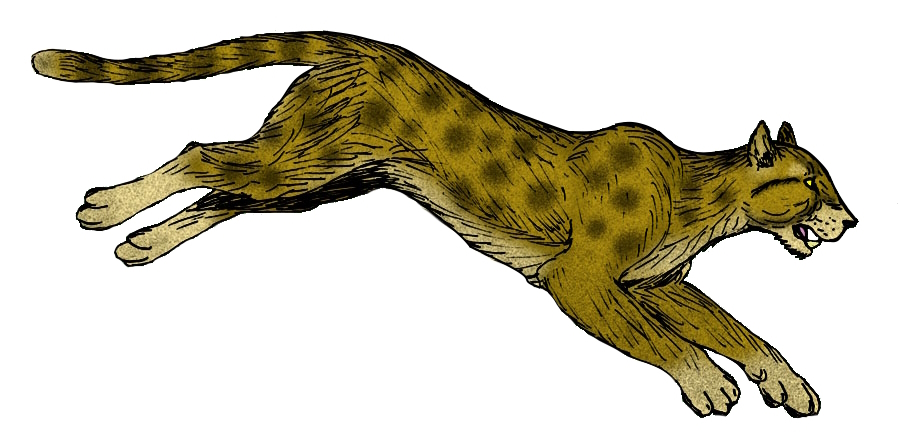
- Restoration of the Pliocene-Pleistocene Miracinonyx, or American cheetah
  †Miracinonyx
  - †Miracinonyx studeri – tentative report
- Mirounga
  - †Mirounga angustirostris – or unidentified comparable form
- Mitra
  - †Mitra fultoni
  - †Mitra idae
- Mitrella
  - †Mitrella carinata
- †Mixocetus – type locality for genus
- Modiolus
  - †Modiolus capax – or unidentified comparable form
- Modulus
- Monoplex
  - †Monoplex amictus
- †Monosaulax
- Montipora
- Mopalia
  - †Mopalia ciliata
- †Moropus
- Morula
- Morus – or unidentified comparable form
- Morus
- Mulinia
- Murex – or unidentified related form
- Musculus
- Mustela
  - †Mustela frenata
- †Mya
  - †Mya truncata
- Myctophum
- Myliobatis
  - †Myliobatis californicus
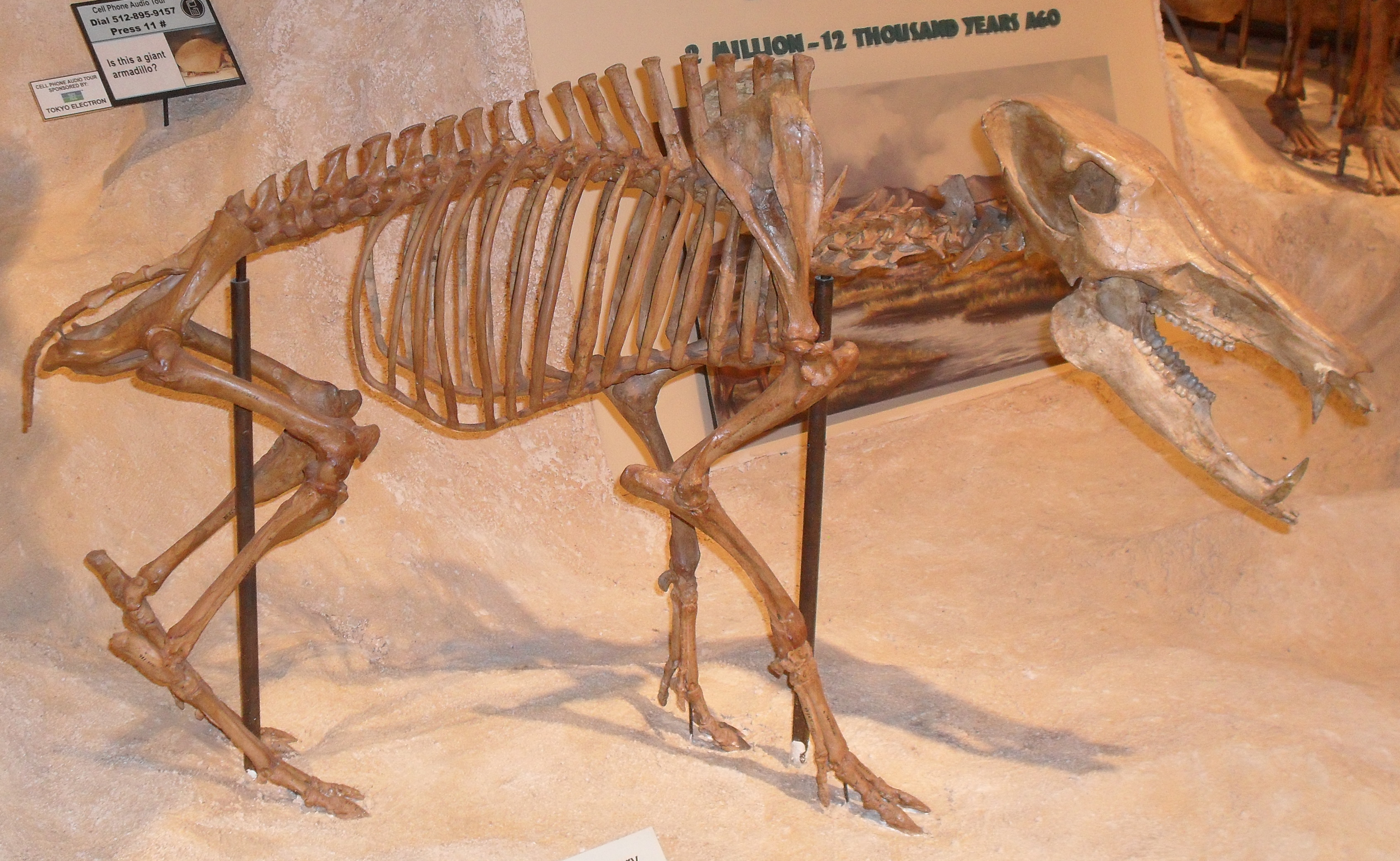
- Fossilized skeleton of the Pliocene-Holocene peccary Mylohyus
  †Mylohyus
  - †Mylohyus fossilis
- †Mylopharodon
  - †Mylopharodon conocephalus
- Mytilus
  - †Mytilus californianus
  - †Mytilus edulis
- Myurella
- †Nannippus
- †Nannocetus – type locality for genus
- †Nanotragulus
- Narona
  - †Narona clavatula
- Nassa
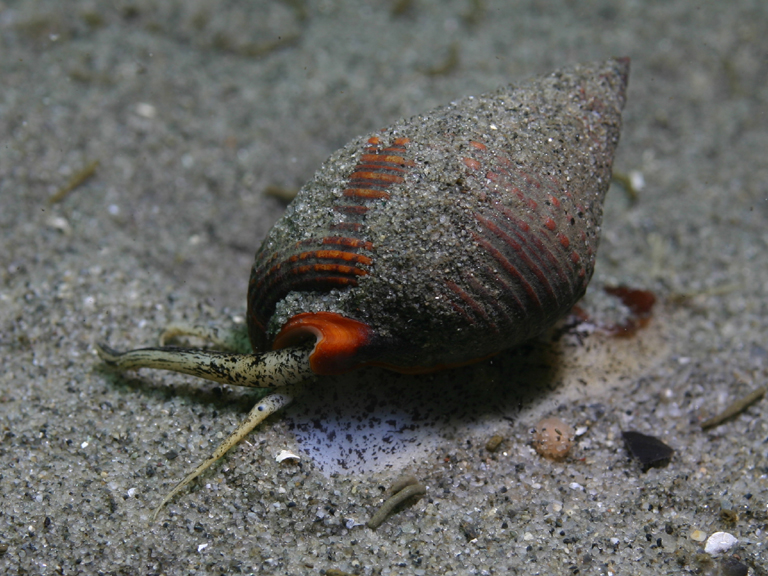
- A living Nassarius, or nassa mud snail
  Nassarius
  - †Nassarius fossatus
- Natica
- Naticarius
- †Navahoceros
- Nectandra
- Negaprion
- †Neobernaya
  - †Neobernaya spadicea
- †Neogyps
  - †Neogyps errans
- †Neohipparion
- †Neoliotomus – or unidentified comparable form
- †Neolitsea
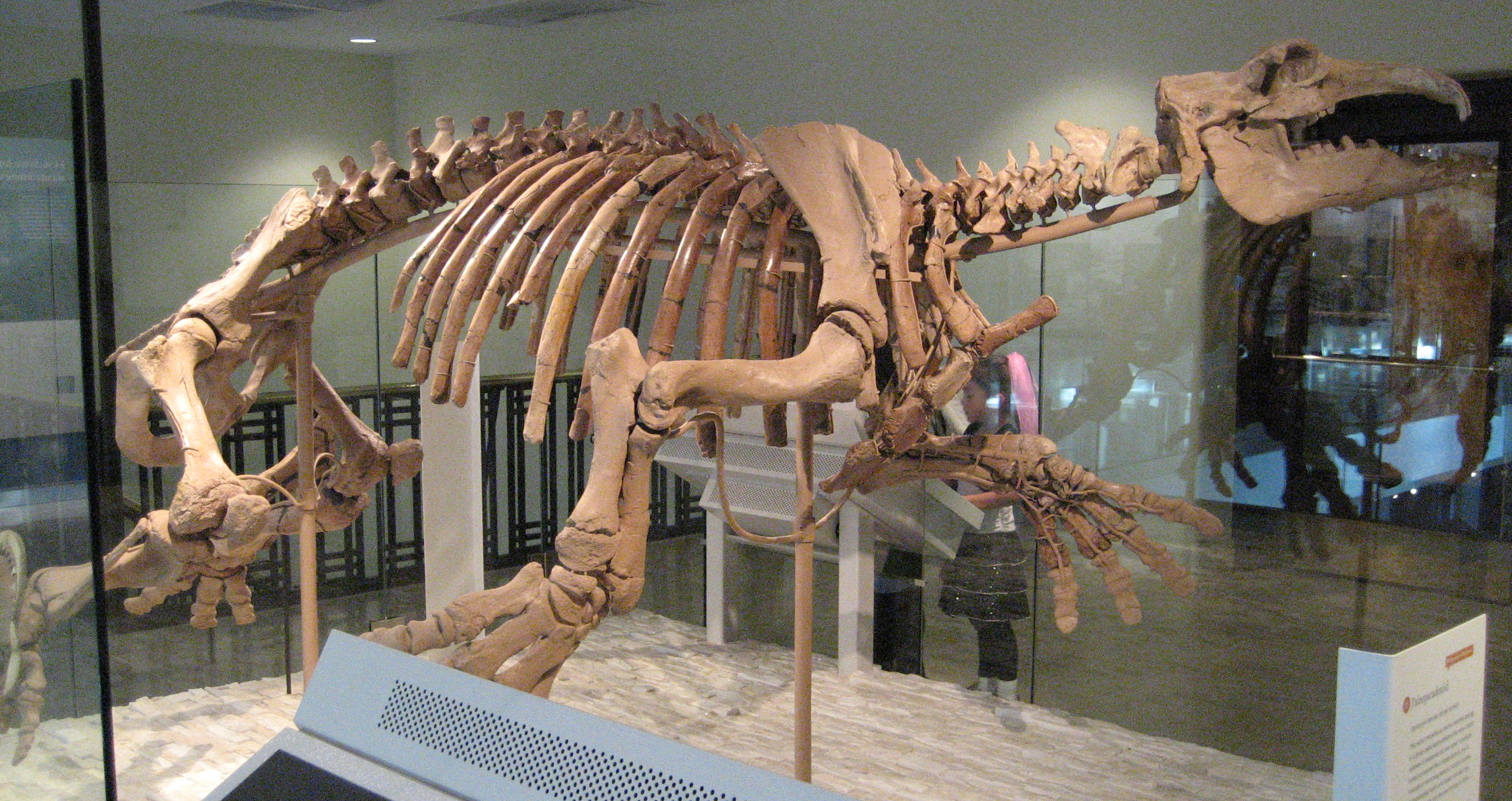
- Mounted fossilized skeleton of the Miocene aquatic desmostylian mammal Neoparadoxia
  †Neoparadoxia – type locality for genus
  - †Neoparadoxia cecilialina – type locality for species
  - †Neoparadoxia repenningi – type locality for species
- Neophrontops
  - †Neophrontops americanus
- †Neoplagiaulax
- Neotamias
  - †Neotamias senex
- †Neotherium – type locality for genus
- Neotoma
  - †Neotoma cinerea – type locality for species
  - †Neotoma fuscipes
  - †Neotoma lepida
- Neptunea
- Nerita
- Neritina
- †Nerium
- Neverita
- Nicrophorus
  - †Nicrophorus guttula
  - †Nicrophorus marginatus – type locality for species
  - †Nicrophorus nigrita
- †Nimravides
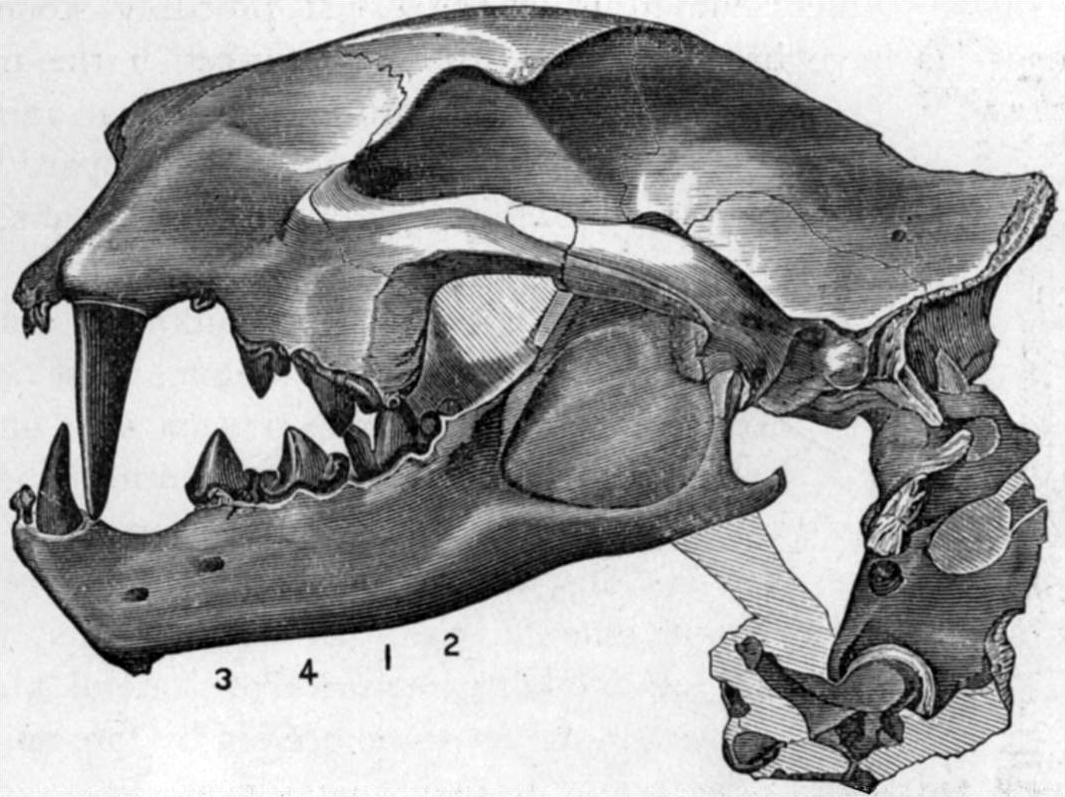
- Illustration of the fossilized skull of the Oligocene false saber-toothed cat Nimravus
  †Nimravus
- Niso – tentative report
- †Nitzschia
- Nodipecten
  - †Nodipecten subnodosus
- Norrisia
  - †Norrisia norrisii
- †Nothrotheriops
- †Nothrotherium
- Notiosorex
  - †Notiosorex crawfordi
- Notoacmea
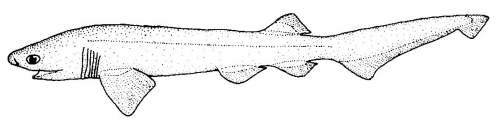
- Illustration of a living Notorynchus cow shark
  Notorhynchus
- †Nototamias
- Nucella
  - †Nucella emarginata
  - †Nucella lamellosa
  - †Nucella lima
- Nucula
- Numenius
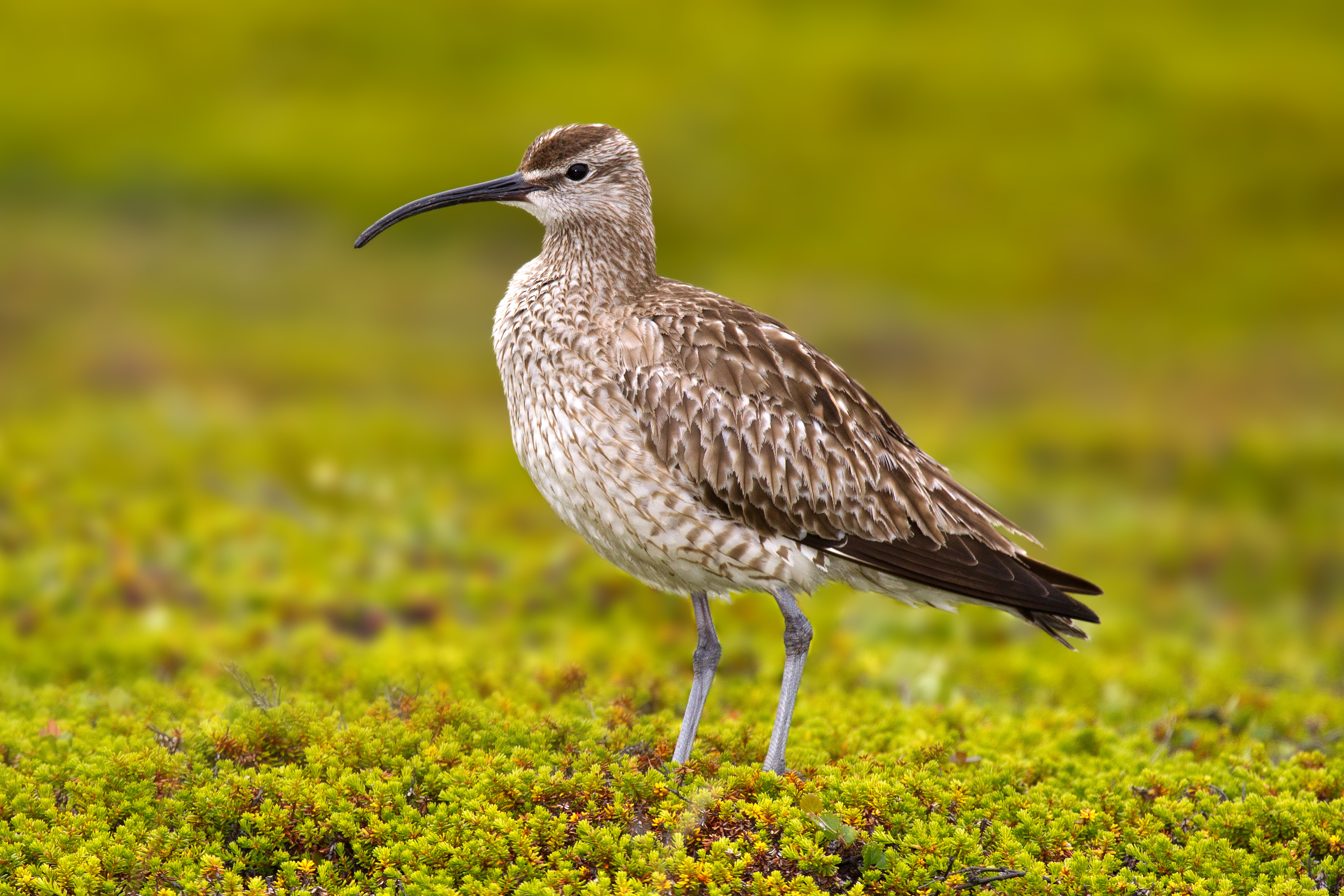
  - A living Numenius phaeopus, or whimbrel
    †Numenius phaeopus
- Nuttallia
- †Nyssa
- Oceanodroma
  - †Oceanodroma furcata
  - †Oceanodroma homochroa
- Ocenebra
- Ocotea
- †Ocystias
- †Odaxosaurus
- Odobenus
  - †Odobenus rosmarus
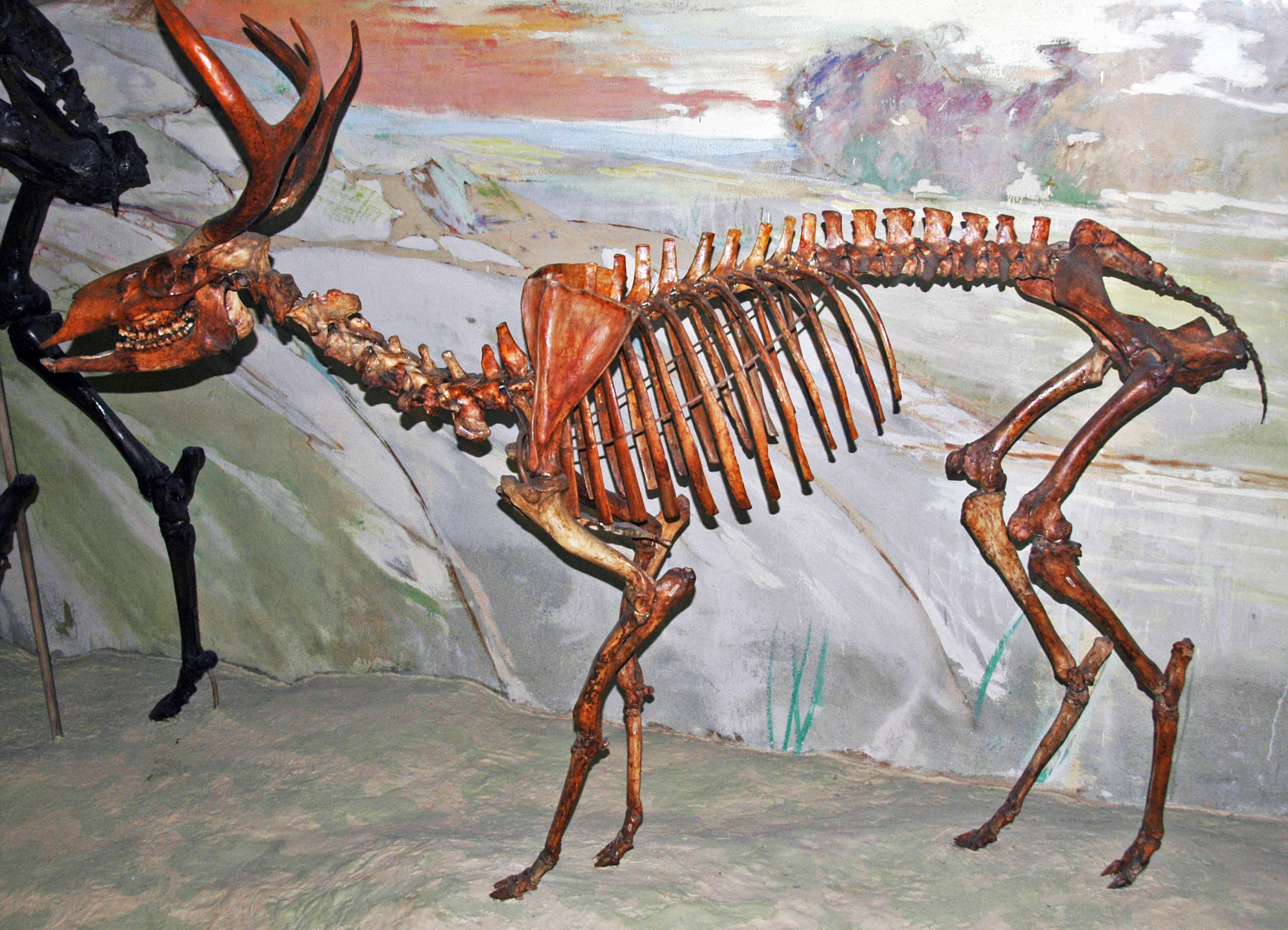
- Mounted fossilized skeleton of the Pleistocene Odocoileus lucasi, or American mountain deer
  Odocoileus
  - †Odocoileus hemionus
  - †Odocoileus virginianus – or unidentified comparable form
- Odontaspis
  - †Odontaspis ferox
- Odostomia
  - †Odostomia avellana
  - †Odostomia beringi – or unidentified comparable form
  - †Odostomia californica – or unidentified comparable form
  - †Odostomia callimene – or unidentified related form
  - †Odostomia columbiana – or unidentified comparable form
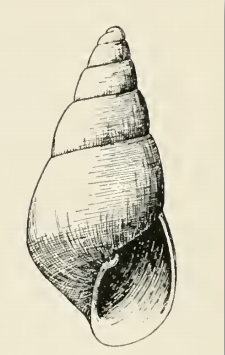
  - Illustration of the shell of an Odostomia donilla pyram shell sea snail
    †Odostomia donilla
  - †Odostomia eugena
  - †Odostomia farallonensis
  - †Odostomia fetella
  - †Odostomia gravida
  - †Odostomia helena
  - †Odostomia minutissima – or unidentified comparable form
  - †Odostomia nemo
  - †Odostomia nota
  - †Odostomia stephensae
  - †Odostomia tenuisculpta – or unidentified comparable form
- Oenopota
  - †Oenopota tabulata
- Oliva
  - †Oliva spicata
- Olivella
  - †Olivella baetica
  - †Olivella biplicata
  - †Olivella gracilis
  - †Olivella pedroana
- Oncorhynchus
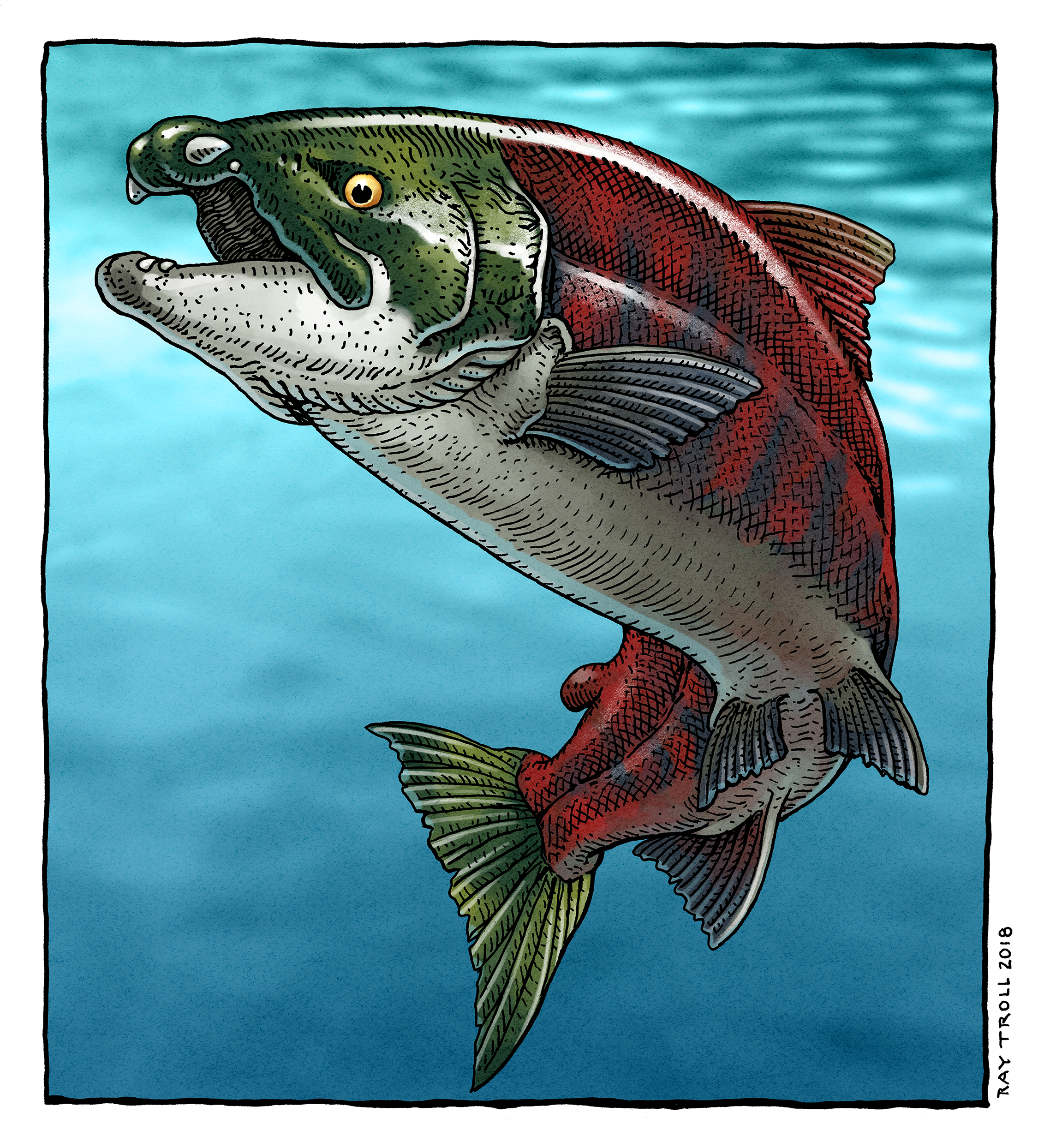
  - Life restoration of a school of the Miocene-Pleistocene Oncorhynchus rastrosus, or saber-toothed salmon
    †Oncorhynchus rastrosus
- Ondatra
- Oneirodes
- Onthophagus
- Onychomys
  - †Onychomys torridus
- Ophiodermella
  - †Ophiodermella inermis
- †Opisthonema
- Oreamnos
  - †Oreamnos americanus
- Oreortyx
  - †Oreortyx picta
- Orthemis
  - †Orthemis ferruginea
- Orthodon
- †Osbornodon
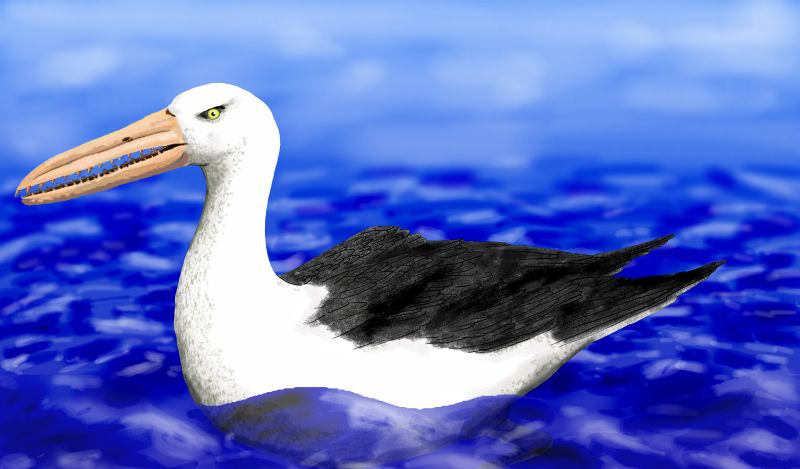
- Life restoration of the Miocene pseudo-toothed bird Osteodontornis
  †Osteodontornis – type locality for genus
  - †Osteodontornis orri – type locality for species
- Ostrea
  - †Ostrea conchaphila
  - †Ostrea lurida
- †Otodus
  - †Otodus megalodon
- Otus
  - †Otus asio
- Ovibos
  - †Ovibos moschatus
- Ovis
  - †Ovis canadensis
- †Oxyrhina
- †Oxyura
  - †Oxyura jamaicensis
- †Ozymandias – type locality for genus
- †Pacifichelys
- †Palaeolagus
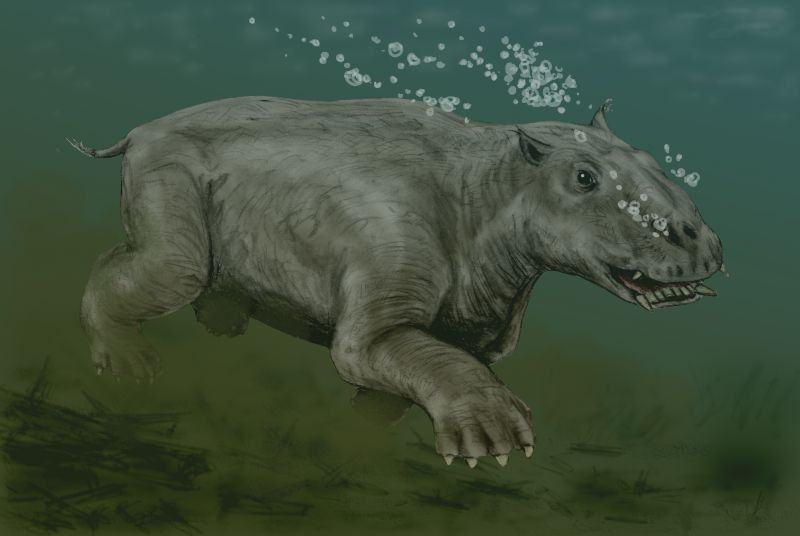
- Restoration of the Miocene aquatic desmostylian mammal Paleoparadoxia
  †Paleoparadoxia
  - †Paleoparadoxia tabatai
- Pandora
- Panopea
  - †Panopea abrupta
- Panthera
  - †Panthera leo
  - †Panthera onca – or unidentified comparable form
- †Parabalaenoptera – type locality for genus
  - †Parabalaenoptera baulinensis – type locality for species
- †Paracynarctus
- †Parahippus
- Paralichthys – type locality for genus
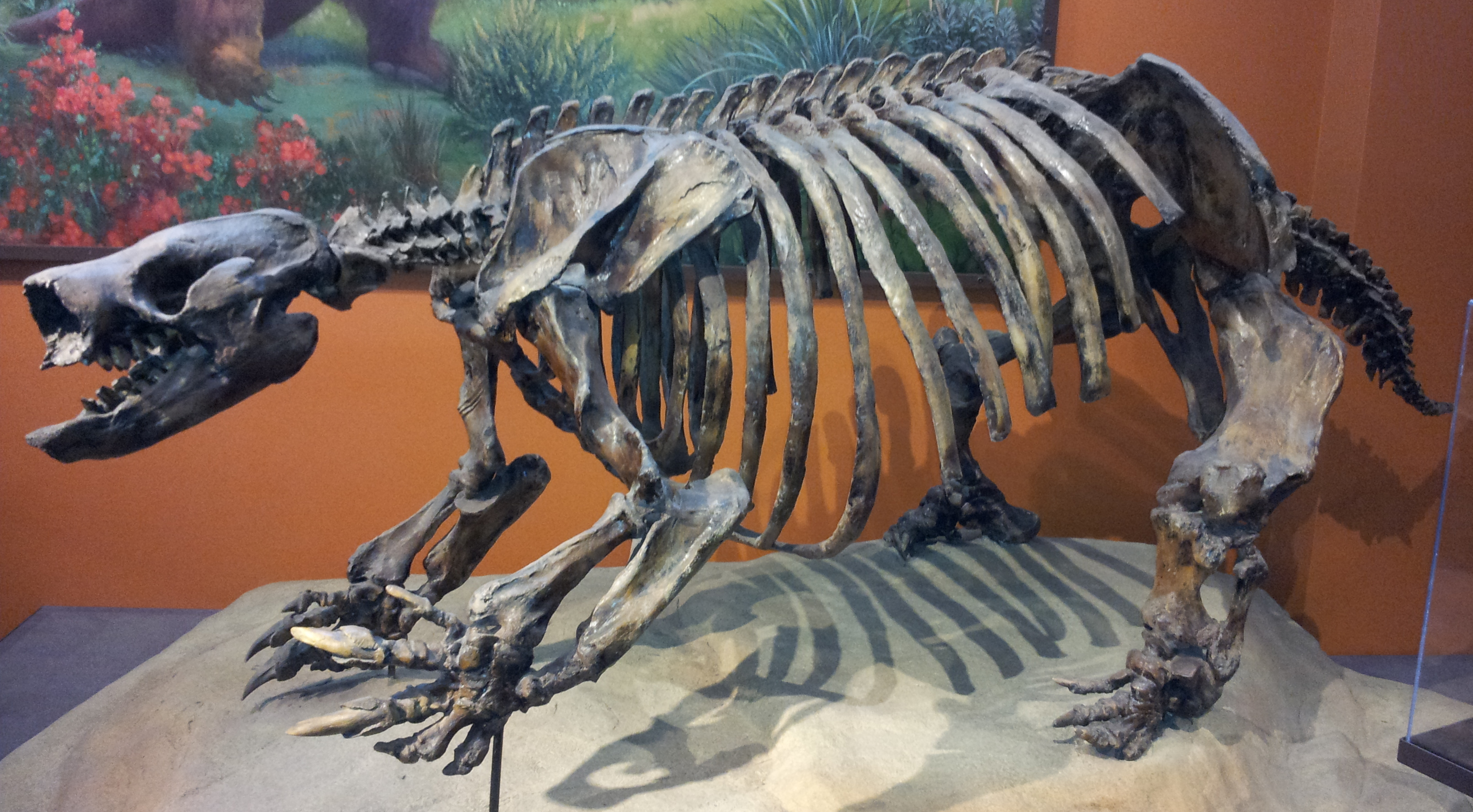
- Fossilized skeleton of the Pliocene-Pleistocene ground sloth Paramylodon
  †Paramylodon
  - †Paramylodon harlani
- †Paramys
- †Parapontoporia
  - †Parapontoporia sternbergi – type locality for species
- †Parastylotermes
  - †Parastylotermes calico – type locality for species
  - †Parastylotermes frazieri – type locality for species
- †Paratomarctus
- †Parietobalaena
- †Paronychomys
- †Parribacus
- Patelloida
- Pecten
- †Pedalion
- †Pediomeryx
- †Pelagiarctos – type locality for genus
  - †Pelagiarctos thomasi – type locality for species
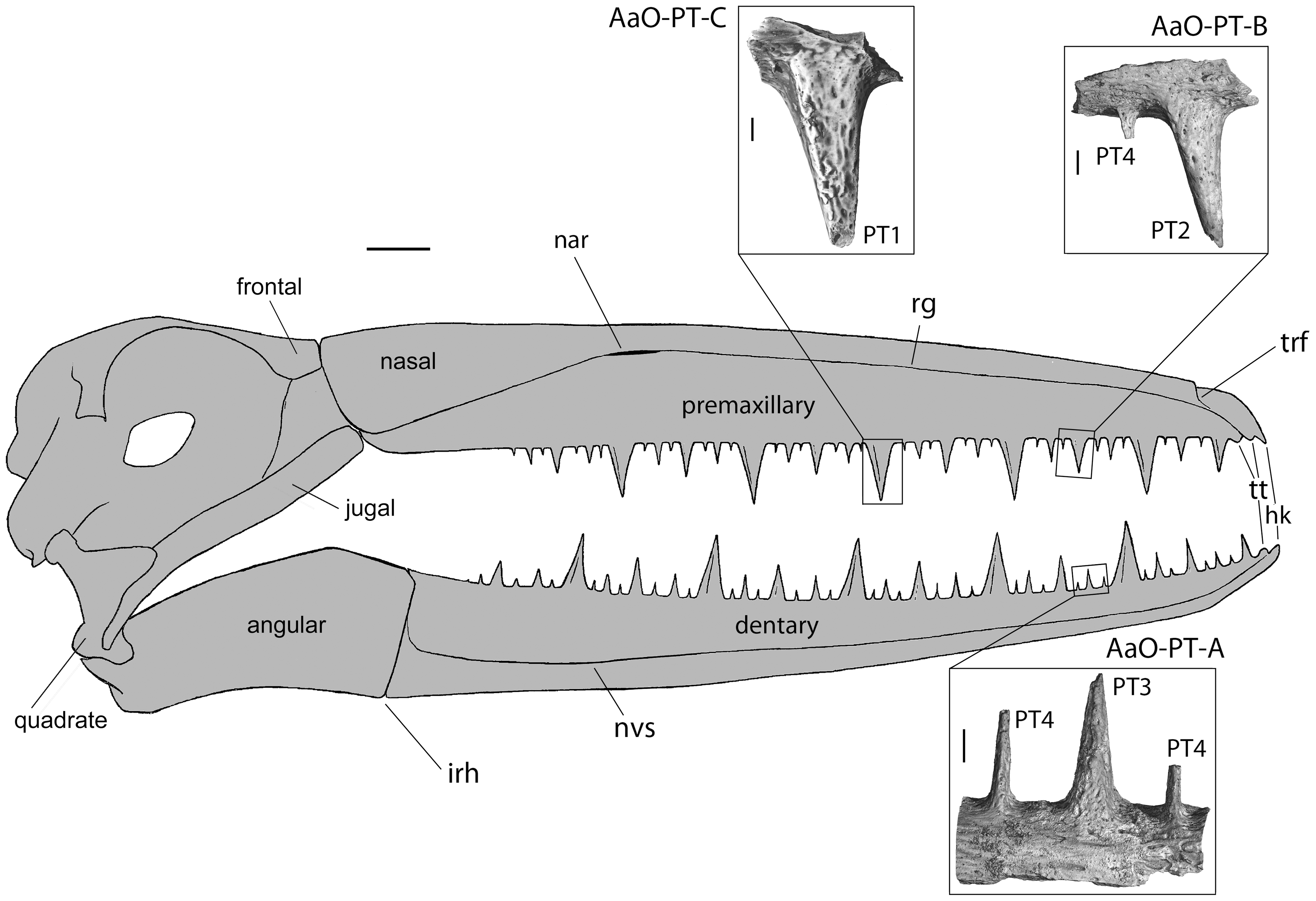
- Reconstructive illustration of a fossilized skull of the Oligocene-Pleistocene pseudo-toothed bird Pelagornis, with close-up insets of its pseudo-teeth
  †Pelagornis
- Pelecanus
  - †Pelecanus erythrorhynchus – or unidentified comparable form
  - †Pelecanus occidentalis
- †Peltosaurus
- †Peraceras
- Perognathus
- Peromyscus
  - †Peromyscus truei – or unidentified comparable form
- †Perse
- Persea
- Persististrombus
- Petricola
- Phalacrocorax
  - †Phalacrocorax auritus
  - †Phalacrocorax pelagicus
  - †Phalacrocorax penicillatus
- Phalaropus
  - †Phalaropus fulicaria
  - †Phalaropus lobatus
- †Phanaeus
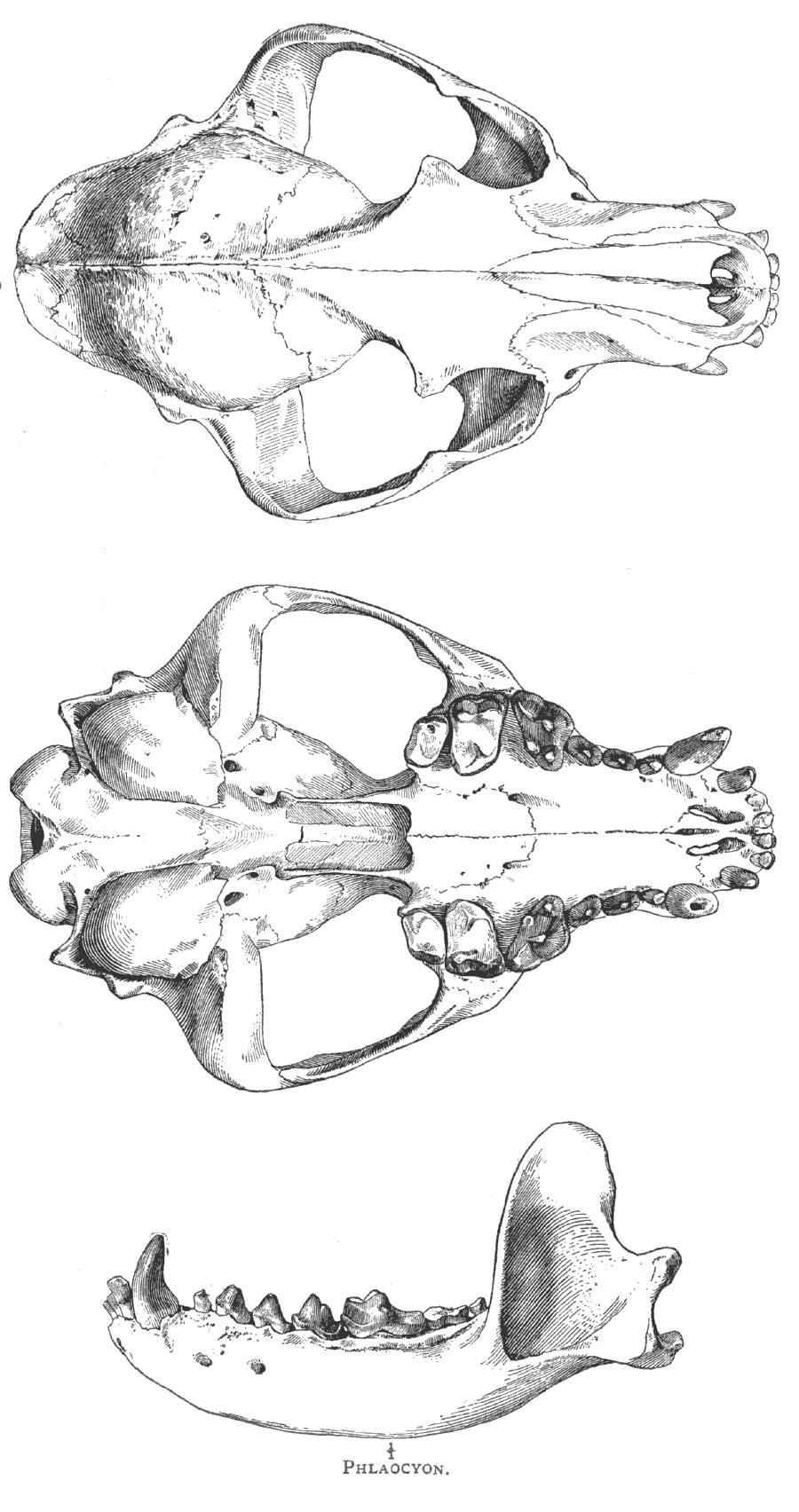
- Illustration of a fossilized skull in multiple views of the Oligocene-Miocene bone-crushing dog Phlaocyon
  †Phlaocyon
- Phloeodes
  - †Phloeodes diabolicus
  - †Phloeodes plicatus
- †Phoberogale
- Phoca
  - †Phoca vitulina – or unidentified comparable form
- Phocoena – or unidentified comparable form
- †Phoebastria
  - †Phoebastria albatrus – type locality for species
- Phoenicopterus – or unidentified comparable form
- Pholadidea
- Pholadomya
- Pholas
- Phos
- †Photinia
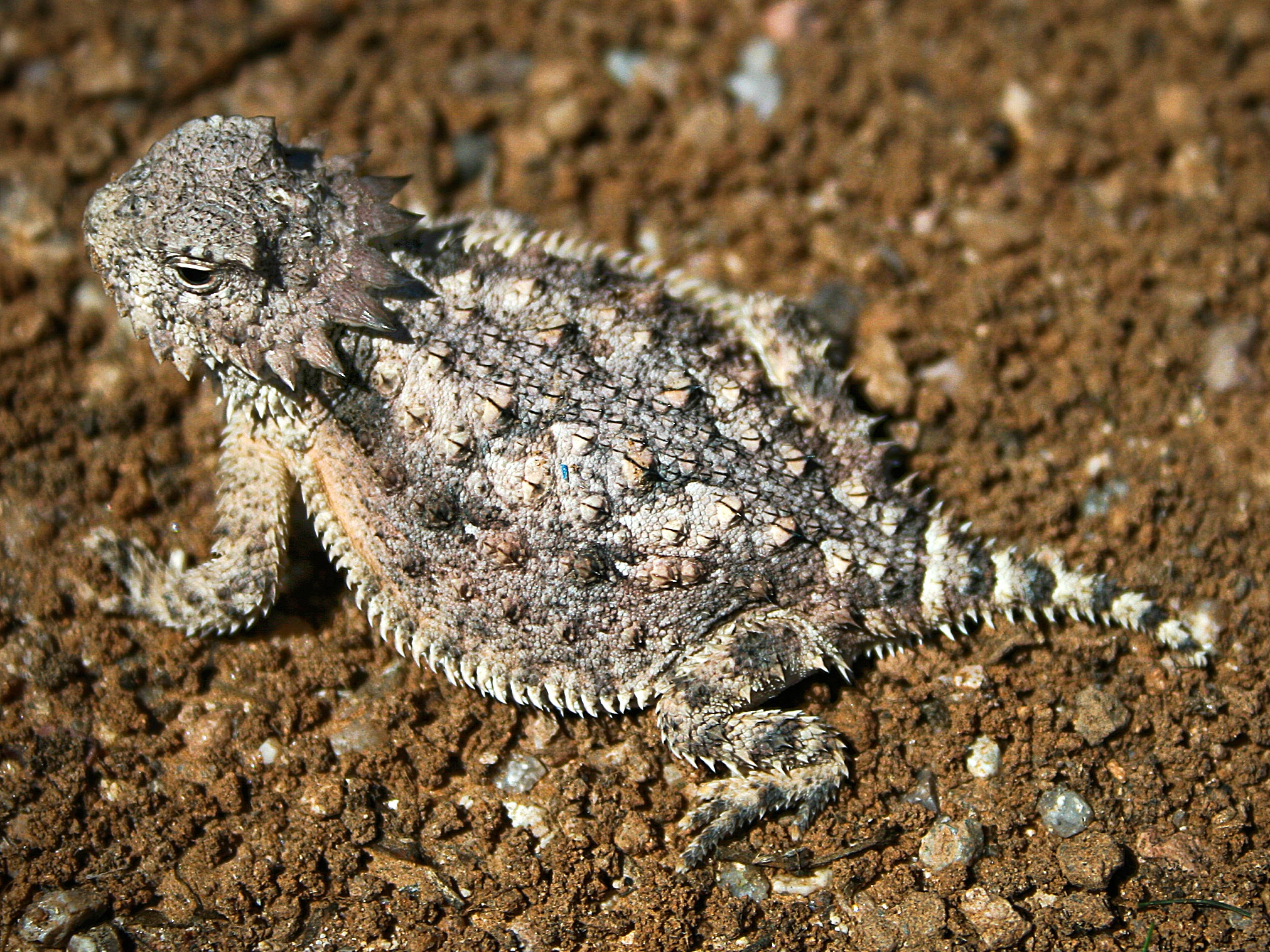
- A living Phrynosoma, or horned lizard
  Phrynosoma
- Phyllonotus
- Physa
- Picea
- Pinna
- Pinus
  - †Pinus muricata
  - †Pinus radiata
- Piranga
  - †Piranga ludoviciana
- Pitar
- Pituophis
  - †Pituophis melanoleucus
- Pitymys
- Platanus
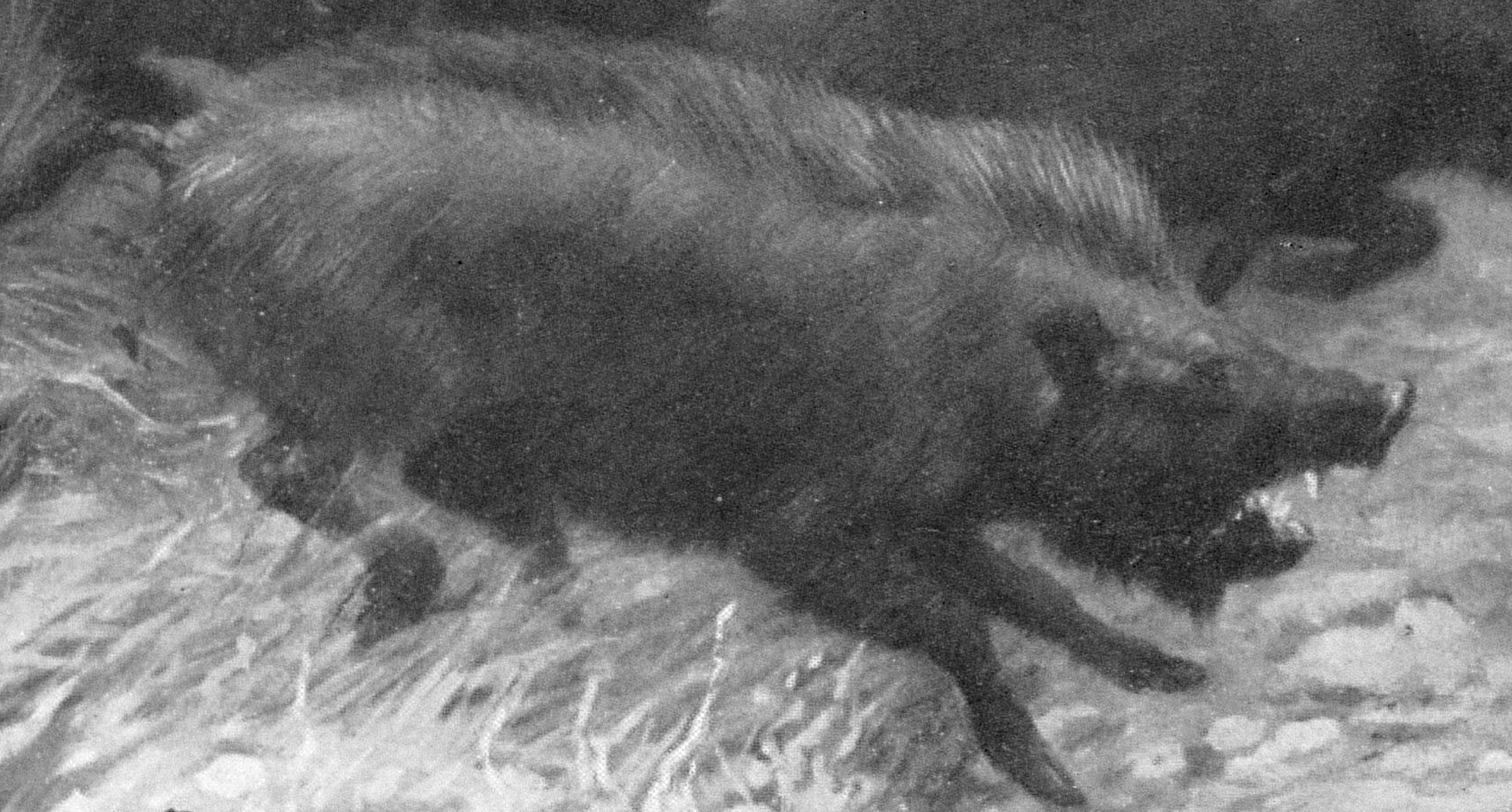
- Restoration of a herd of alarmed Miocene-Pleistocene peccaries of the genus Platygonus. Charles R. Knight (1922).
  †Platygonus
- Platynus
- Plegadis
  - †Plegadis chihi
- †Pleiolama
- †Plesiadapis
- †Plesiogulo
- Pleurofusia
- †Pleuroncodes
- †Pleuronichthys
- †Pliauchenia
- †Pliocyon
- †Pliohippus
- †Pliometanastes
- †Plionarctos
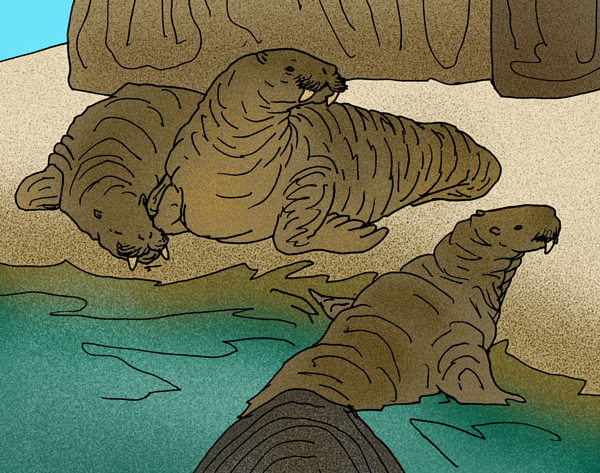
- Life restoration of the Miocene walrus Pliopedia
  †Pliopedia – type locality for genus
  - †Pliopedia pacifica – type locality for species
- †Plithocyon
- Pluvialis
  - †Pluvialis squatarola
- †Poabromylus – tentative report
- Pocillopora
- Podiceps
  - †Podiceps auritus
- Podilymbus
  - †Podilymbus podiceps
- Pododesmus
  - †Pododesmus macrochisma
- †Poebrodon
  - †Poebrodon californicus – type locality for species
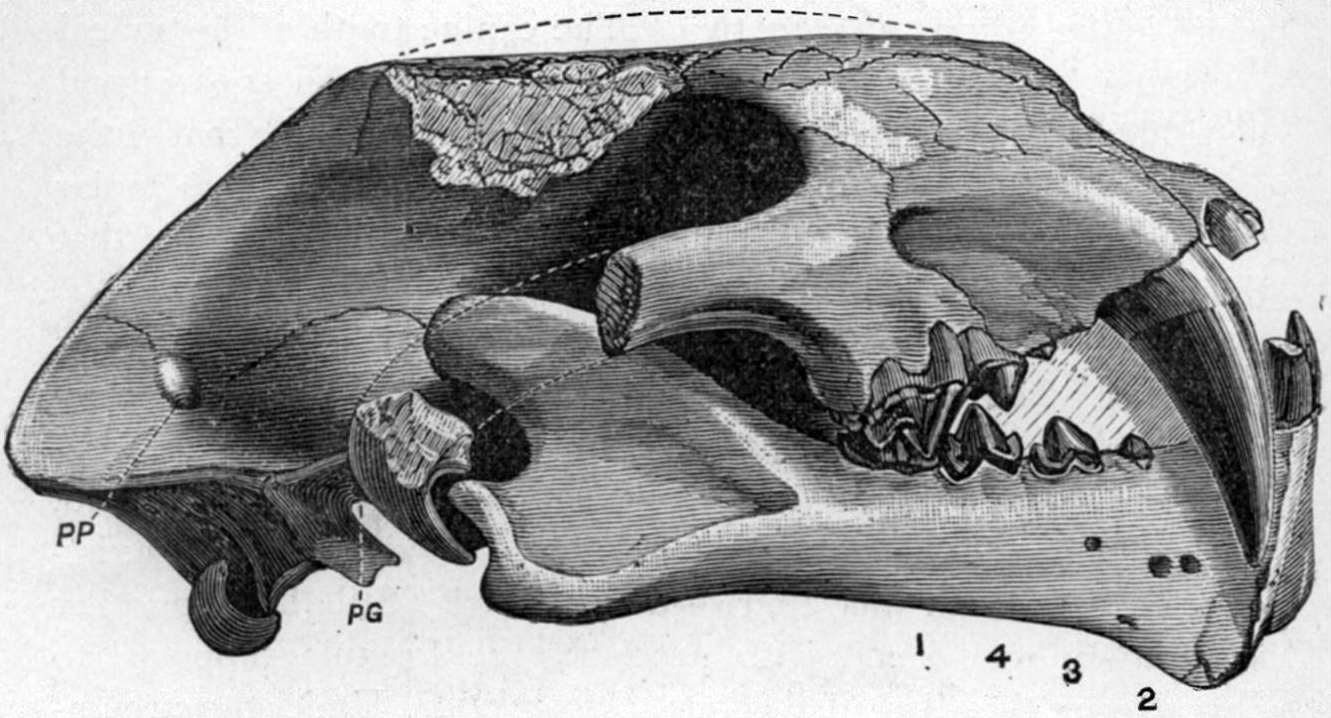
- Illustration of a fossilized skull of the Oligocene false faber-toothed cat Pogonodon
  †Pogonodon
- Polinices
  - †Polinices lewisii
- Polydora
- Polymesoda
- Polystira
- †Pongamia
- †Pontolis – or unidentified comparable form
  - †Pontolis magnus
- Populus
- Porichthys
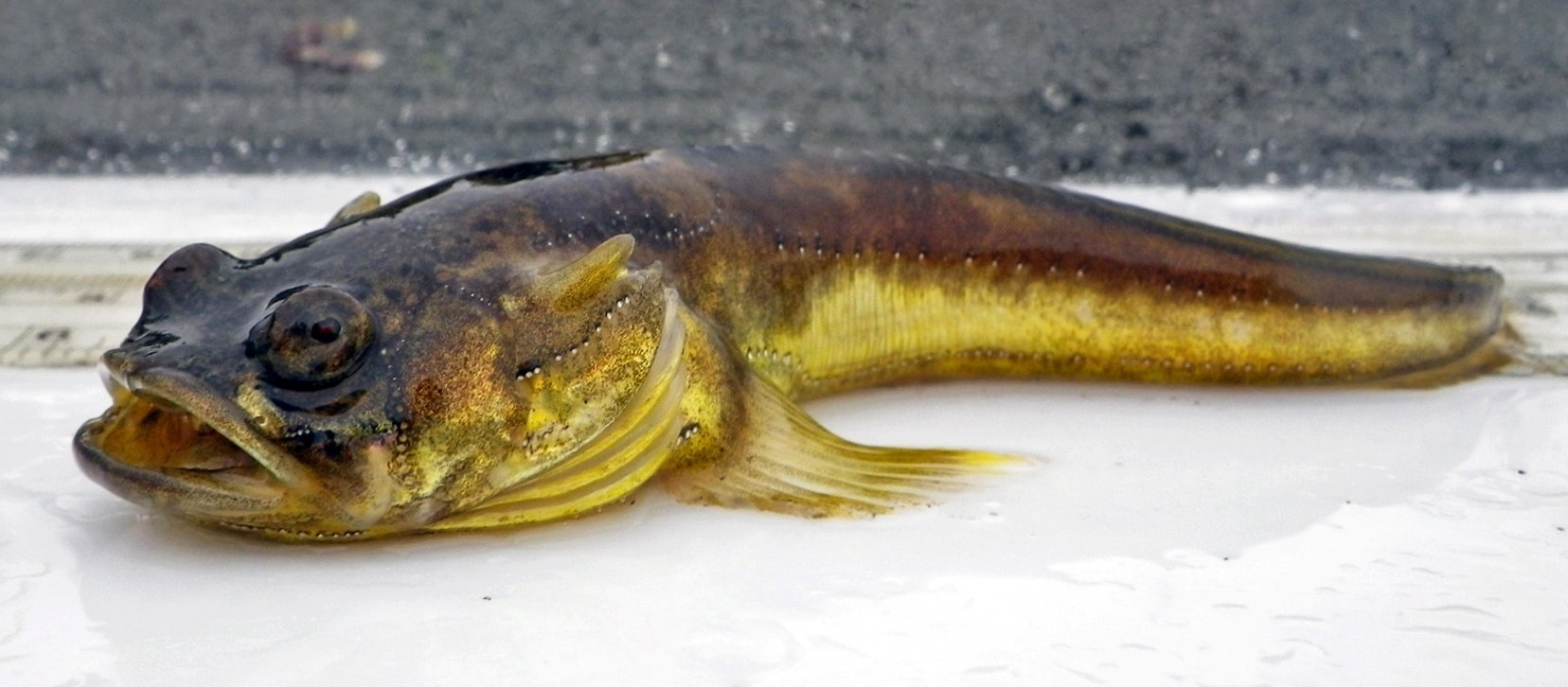
  - A modern Porichthys notatus, or plainfin midshipman
    †Porichthys notatus
- Porites
- †Portunites
- †Potamides
- †Praemancalla – type locality for genus
- Priene
- Prionace
  - †Prionace glauca
- †Pristichampsus
- Pristiophorus
- †Procamelus
- †Procynodictis
- Procyon
  - †Procyon lotor
- †Promartes
- †Protanthias – type locality for genus
- †Protepicyon
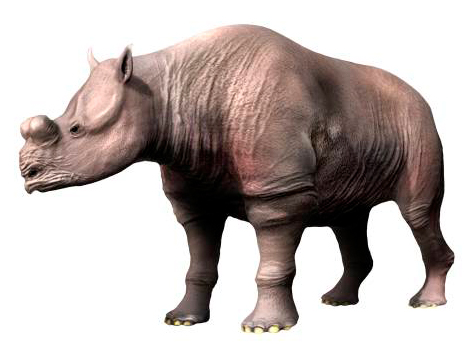
- Life restoration of the Eocene brontothere mammal Protitanops
  †Protitanops
- †Protohepialus – type locality for genus
  - †Protohepialus comstocki – type locality for species
- †Protolabis
- †Protomarctus
- †Protostrix
- Protothaca
- †Protylopus
- Prunus
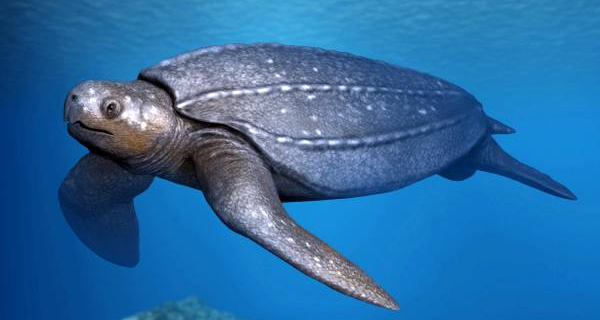
- Hypothetical restoration of the Oligocene-Pliocene sea turtle Psephophorus
  †Psephophorus
- †Pseudaelurus
- Pseudochama
- Pseudoliva
- Pseudomelatoma
  - †Pseudomelatoma penicillata
- †Pseudoseriola – type locality for genus
- †Pseudotsuga
- Pteria
- †Pteroplatea
- Pteropurpura
  - †Pteropurpura festiva
- Pterostichus
- Pterynotus
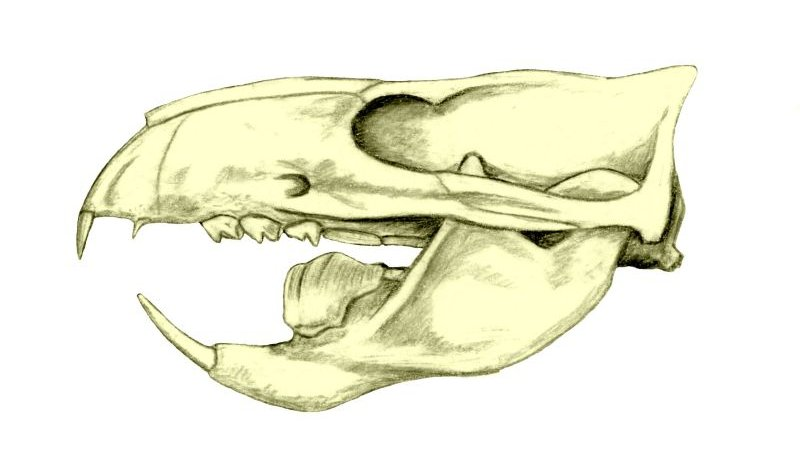
- Illustration of a fossilized skull of the Paleocene multituberculate mammal Ptilodus
  †Ptilodus
- Ptinus
- Ptychoramphus
  - †Ptychoramphus aleuticus
- Puffinus
  - †Puffinus griseus
  - †Puffinus opisthomelas
  - †Puffinus tenuirostris
- †Puma
  - †Puma concolor – type locality for species
- Puncturella
  - †Puncturella galeata
- Purpura
- Pusula
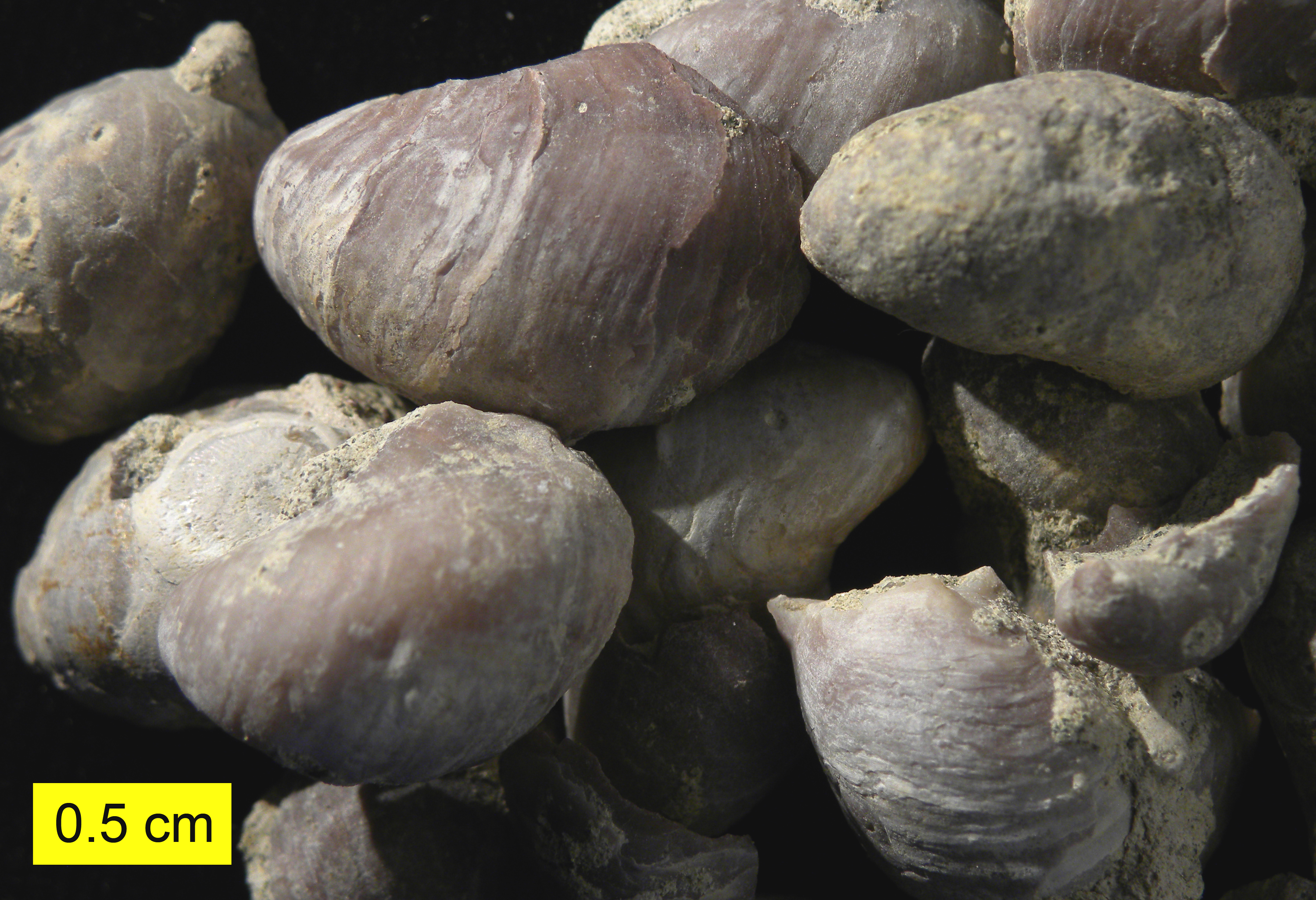
- Assemblage of fossilized shells of the Cretaceous-Pleistocene oyster Pycnodonte
  Pycnodonte
- Pyramidella
  - †Pyramidella adamsi – or unidentified comparable form
- Pyrene
- Quercus
- Raja
- Rallus
  - †Rallus limicola
- †Ramoceros
- †Raja
- Rallus
  - †Rallus limicola
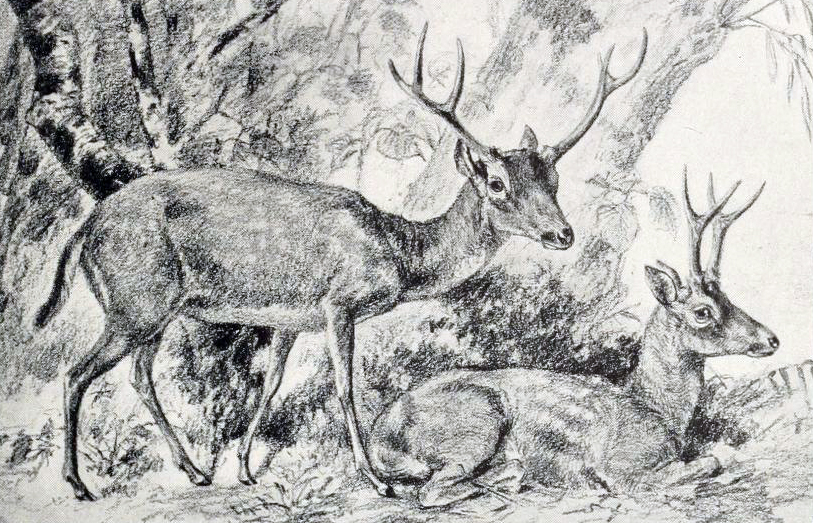
- Life restoration of the Miocene-Pliocene pronghorn Ramoceros and Cosoryx. Robert Bruce Horsfall (1913).
  †Ramoceros
- †Rana
- Rapana
- Recurvirostra
- Reithrodontomys
- †Repomys
- Reticulitermes
- Reticutriton
- Retusa
- †Rhabdammina
- †Rhamnidium
- †Rhamnus
- Rhus
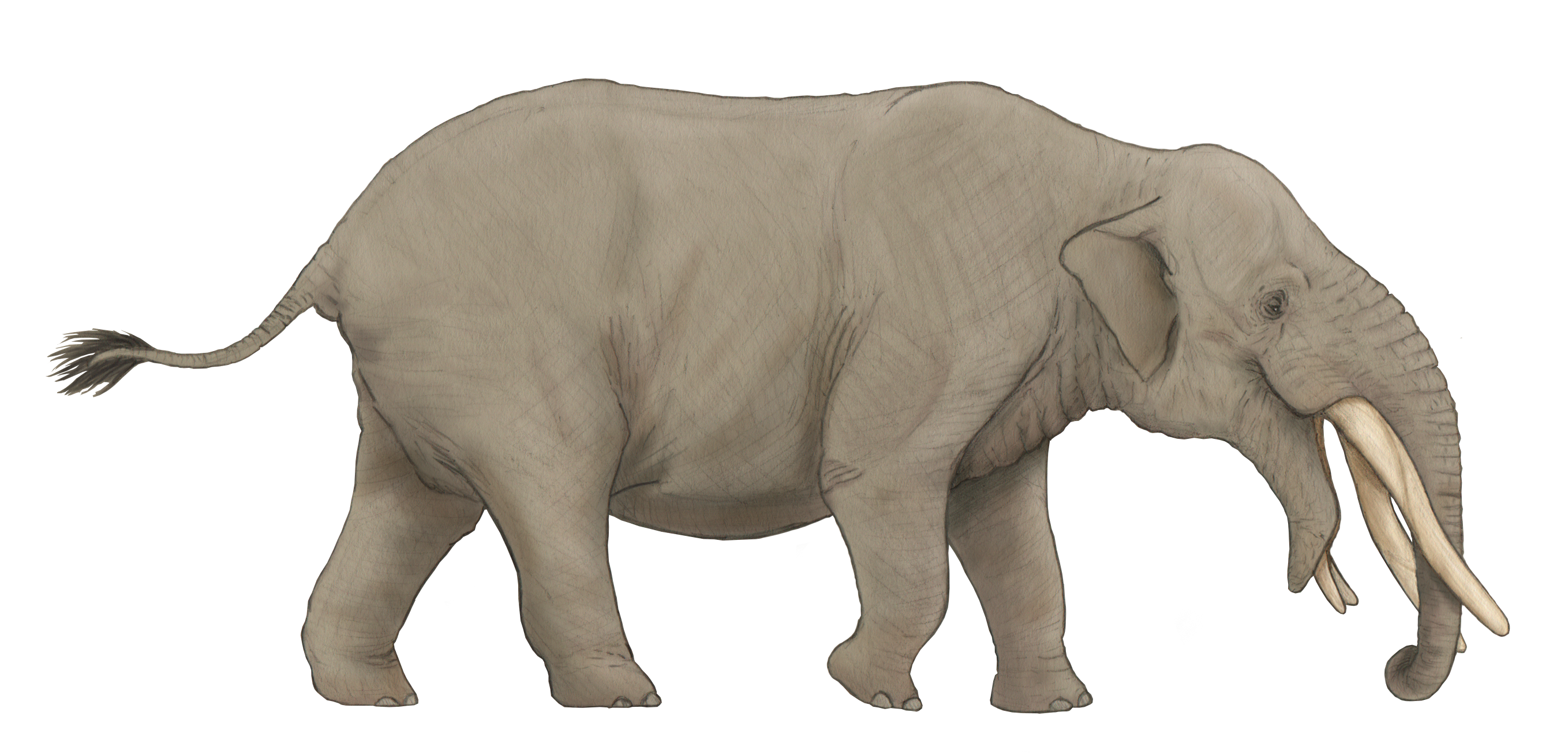
- Restoration of the Miocene-Pliocene elephant relative Rhynchotherium
  †Rhynchotherium
- †Rhythmias
- Rimella
- Rissa
  - †Rissa tridactyla
- Rissoina
- †Robinia
- †Rotularia
- Sabal
- Sagmatias
- Salix
- †Saniwa
  - †Saniwa ensidens – type locality for species
- †Sapindus
- †Sarda
- Sassia
- Saxidomus
  - †Saxidomus gigantea
  - †Saxidomus nuttalli
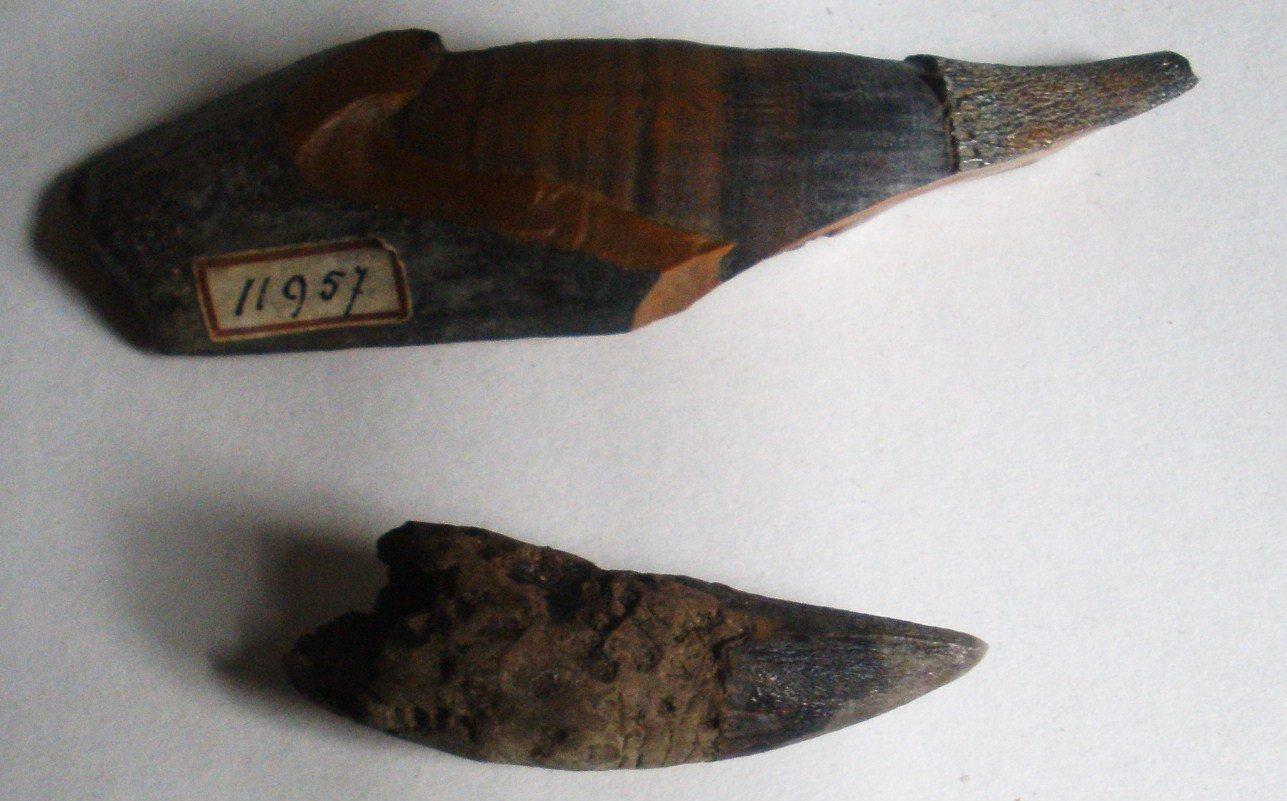
- Fossilized teeth of the Neogene sperm whale Scaldicetus
  †Scaldicetus
- Scapanus
  - †Scapanus latimanus
- Scaphander
- Scapharca
- Scaphinotus
  - †Scaphinotus interruptus
- †Scaphohippus
- Sceloporus
  - †Sceloporus occidentalis
- †Schistomerus – type locality for genus
  - †Schistomerus californense – type locality for species
- Schizaster
- Sciurus
- Scomber
- †Scomberesox
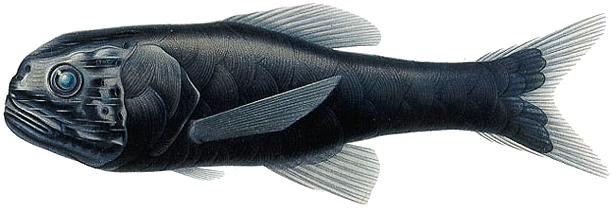
- Illustration of a living Scopelogadus ridgehead
  Scopelogadus
- †Scutella
- Scyliorhinus
- †Scymnorhinus
- †Sebastodes
- Seila
- Semele – tentative report
- Semele
- Semicassis
- Semicossyphus
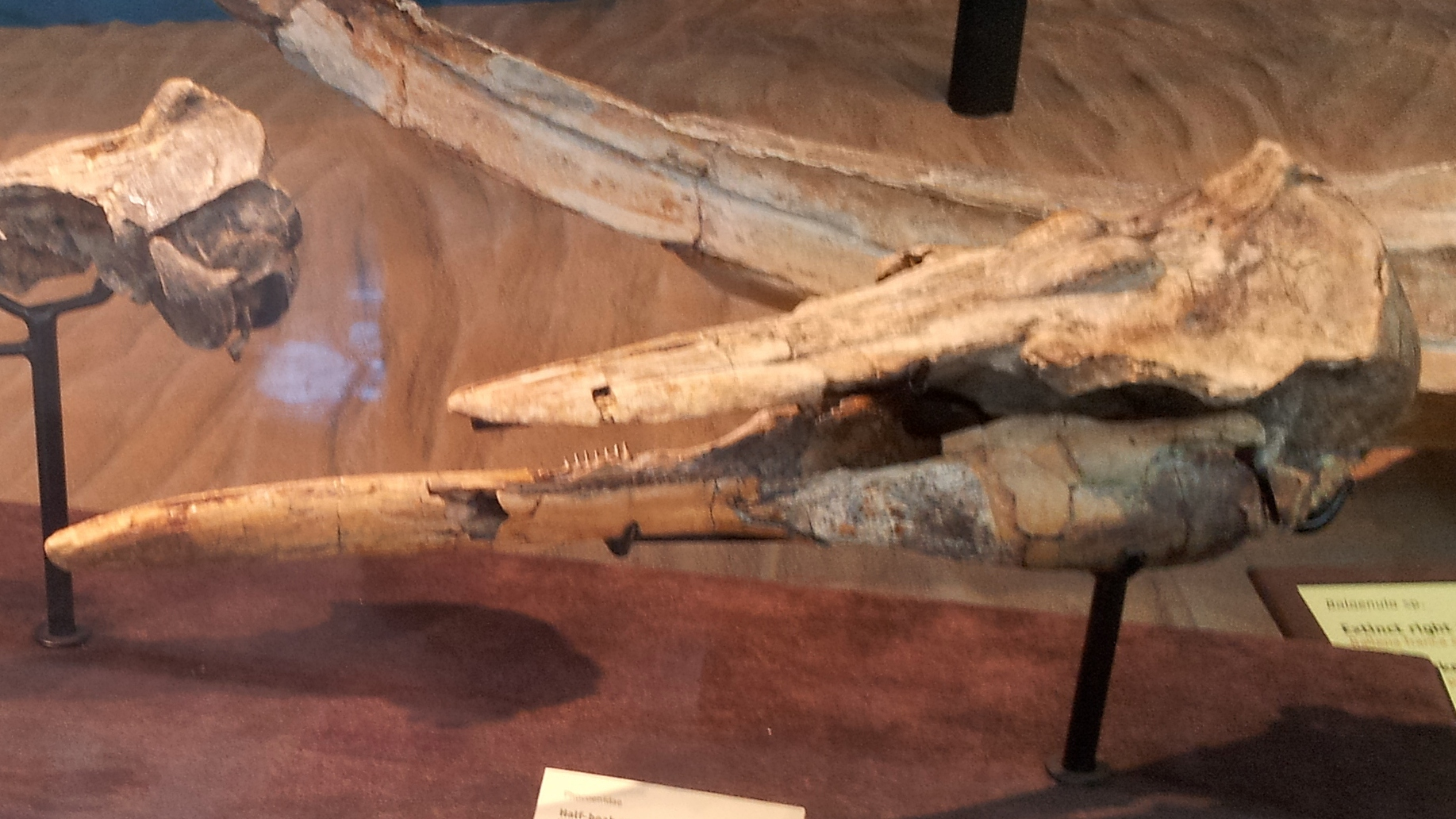
- Fossilized skull of the Pliocene porpoise Semirostrum
  †Semirostrum – type locality for genus
  - †Semirostrum ceruttii – type locality for species
- †Sequoiadendron
- †Serbelodon
- Serica
- Seriola
- Seriphus
  - †Seriphus politus
- Serpula
- Serpulorbis
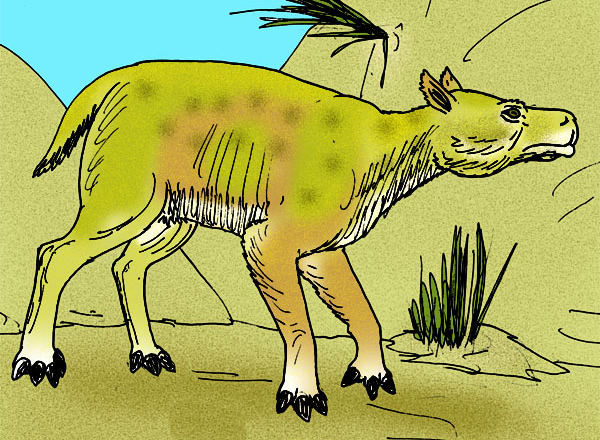
- Restoration of two species of the Oligocene oreodont mammal genus Sespia
  †Sespia
- Siderastrea
- Sigmodon
- Sigmoilina – tentative report
- Siliqua
  - †Siliqua patula – or unidentified related form
- Sinum
- Siphonalia
- Skenea
  - †Skenea californica
- †Smilax
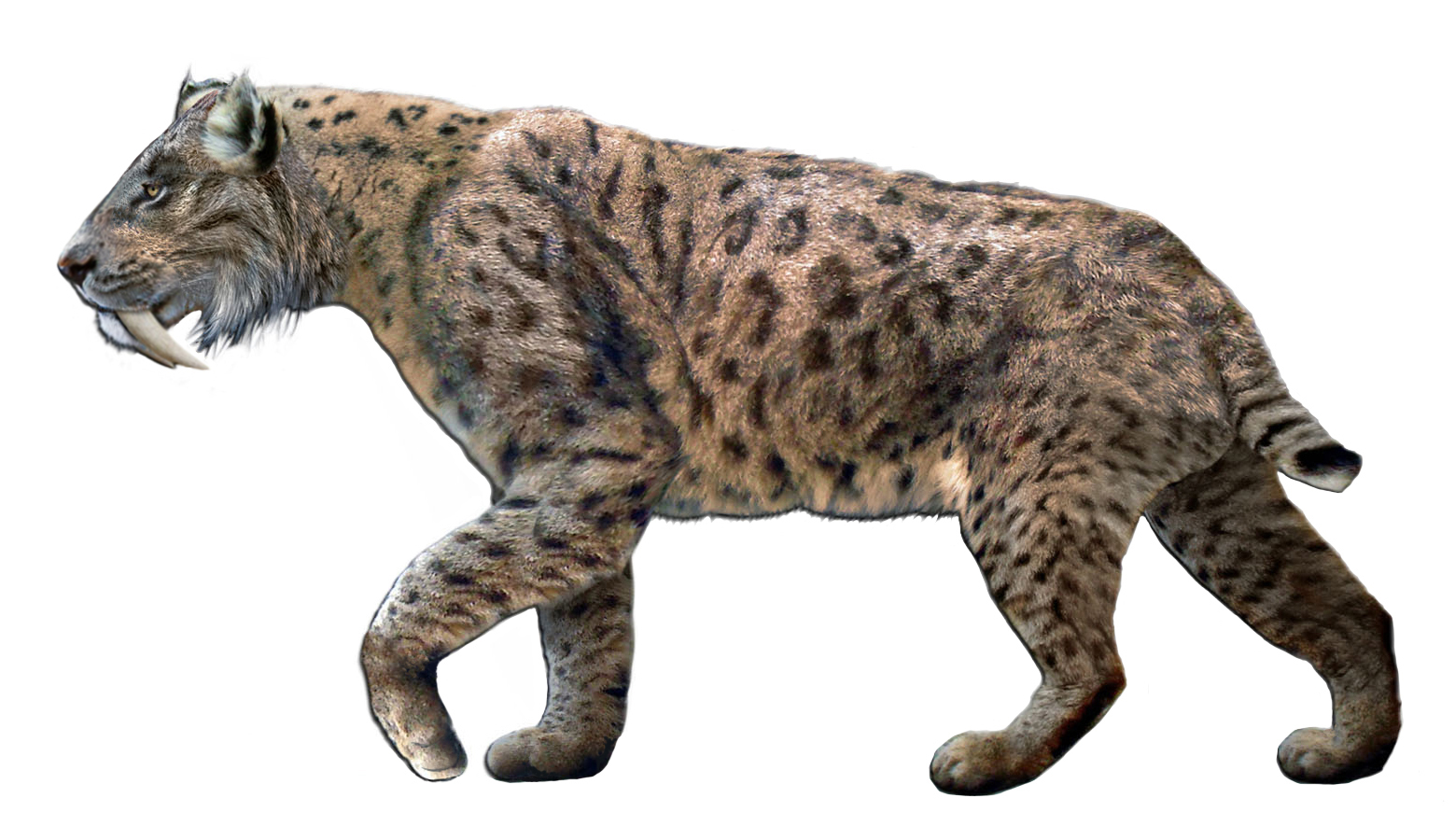
- Life restoration of the Pleistocene-Holocene saber-tooth cat Smilodon
  †Smilodon
  - †Smilodon fatalis
  - †Smilodon gracilis
- †Smilodonichthys
- Solariella
  - †Solariella peramabilis
- Solemya
- Solen
- Solenosteira
- Sorex
- Spermophilus
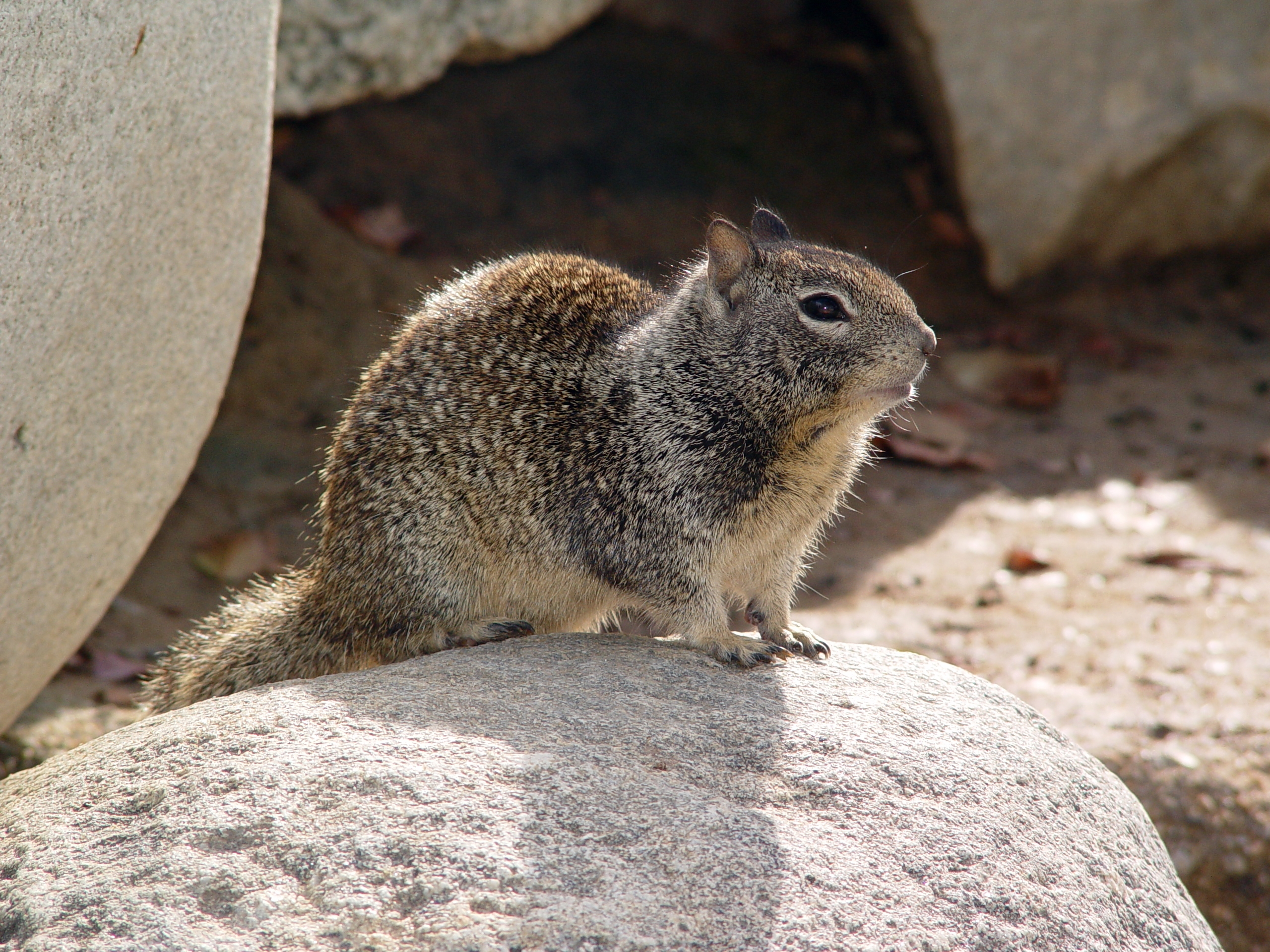
  - A living Otospermophilus beecheyi (formerly Spermophilus beecheyi), or California ground squirrel
    †Spermophilus beecheyi
  - †Spermophilus lateralis
- Sphyrna
- Spilogale
  - †Spilogale putorius
- Spirotropis
- Spisula
- Spondylus
- Squalus
- Squatina
  - †Squatina californica – or unidentified comparable form
- Squilla
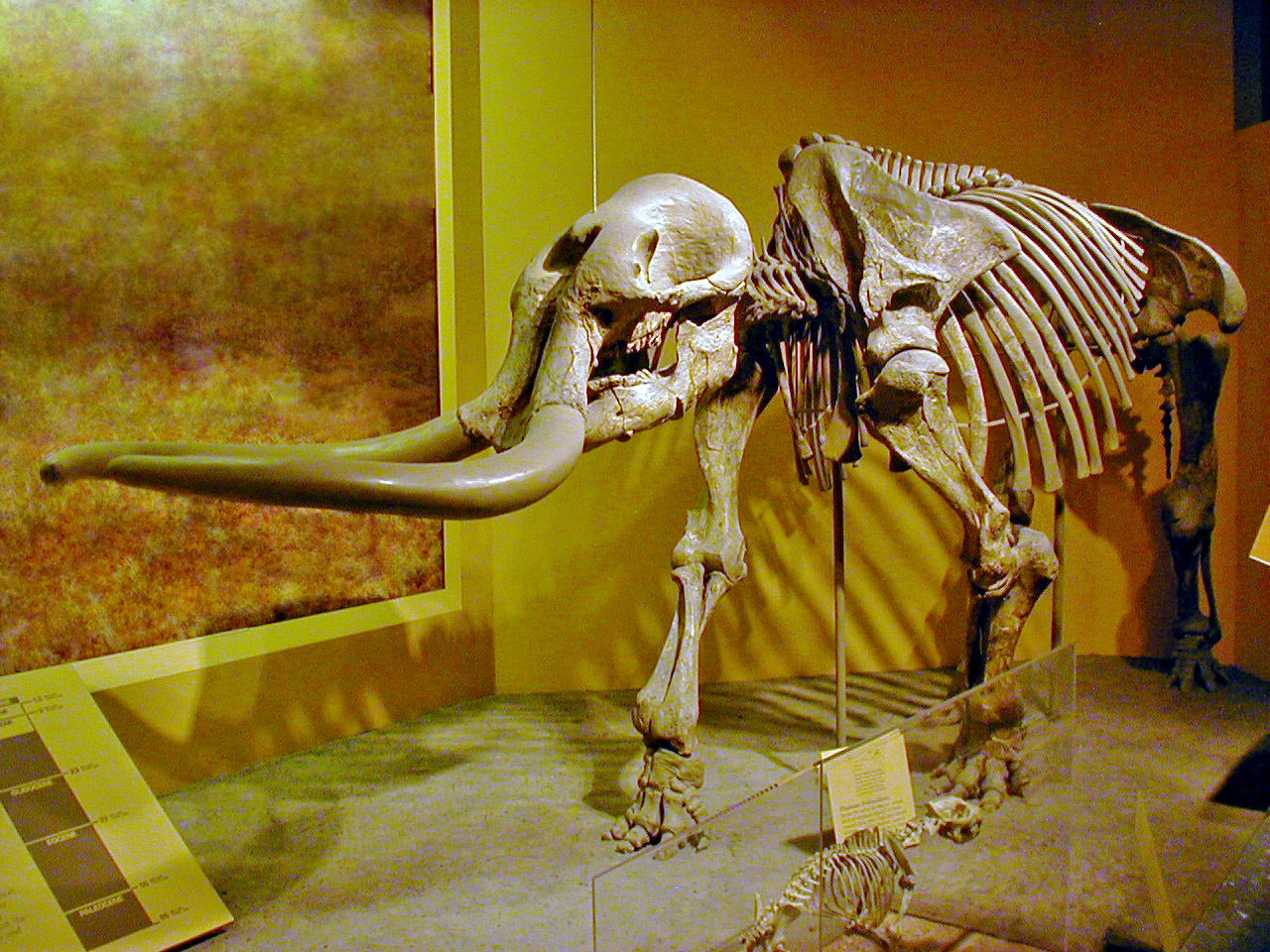
- Mounted fossilized skeleton of the Pliocene-Pleistocene elephant relative Stegomastodon
  †Stegomastodon
  - †Stegomastodon mirificus – or unidentified comparable form
- Stenella
- †Stenomylus
  - †Stenomylus hitchcocki – or unidentified comparable form
- Stenoplax
  - †Stenoplax conspicua
- Stercorarius
- Sterna
- †Sternbergia – type locality for genus
- Sthenictis
- †Stictocarbo
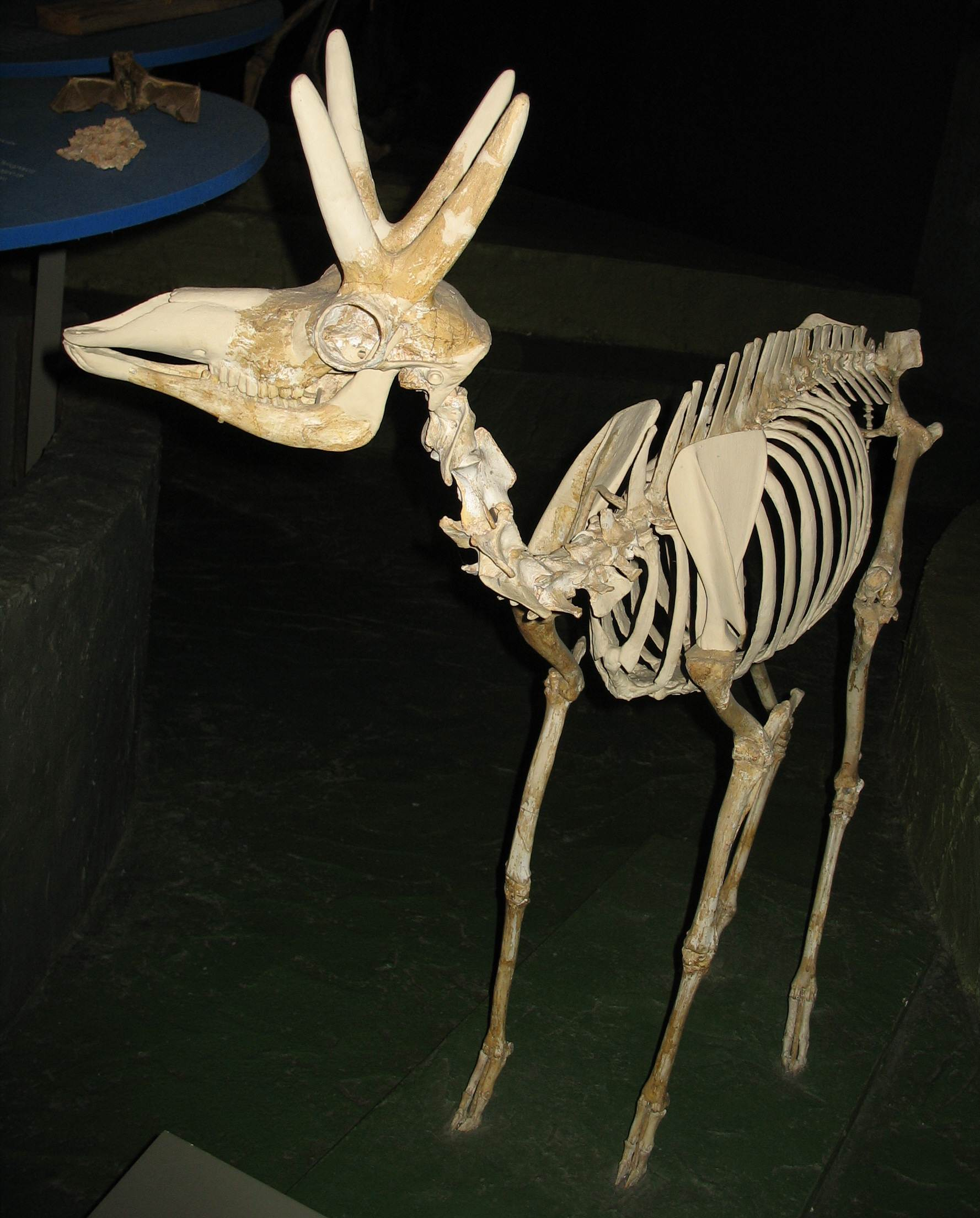
- Mounted fossilized skeleton of the fossil pronghorn Stockoceros
  †Stockoceros – or unidentified comparable form
- Stomias
- Stramonita
  - †Stramonita biserialis
  - †Stramonita canaliculata
- †Striatolamia
- Strioterebrum
- Strombiformis
- Strombus
  - †Strombus galeatus
  - †Strombus gracilior
- Strongylocentrotus
- †Strongylodon
- Sturnella
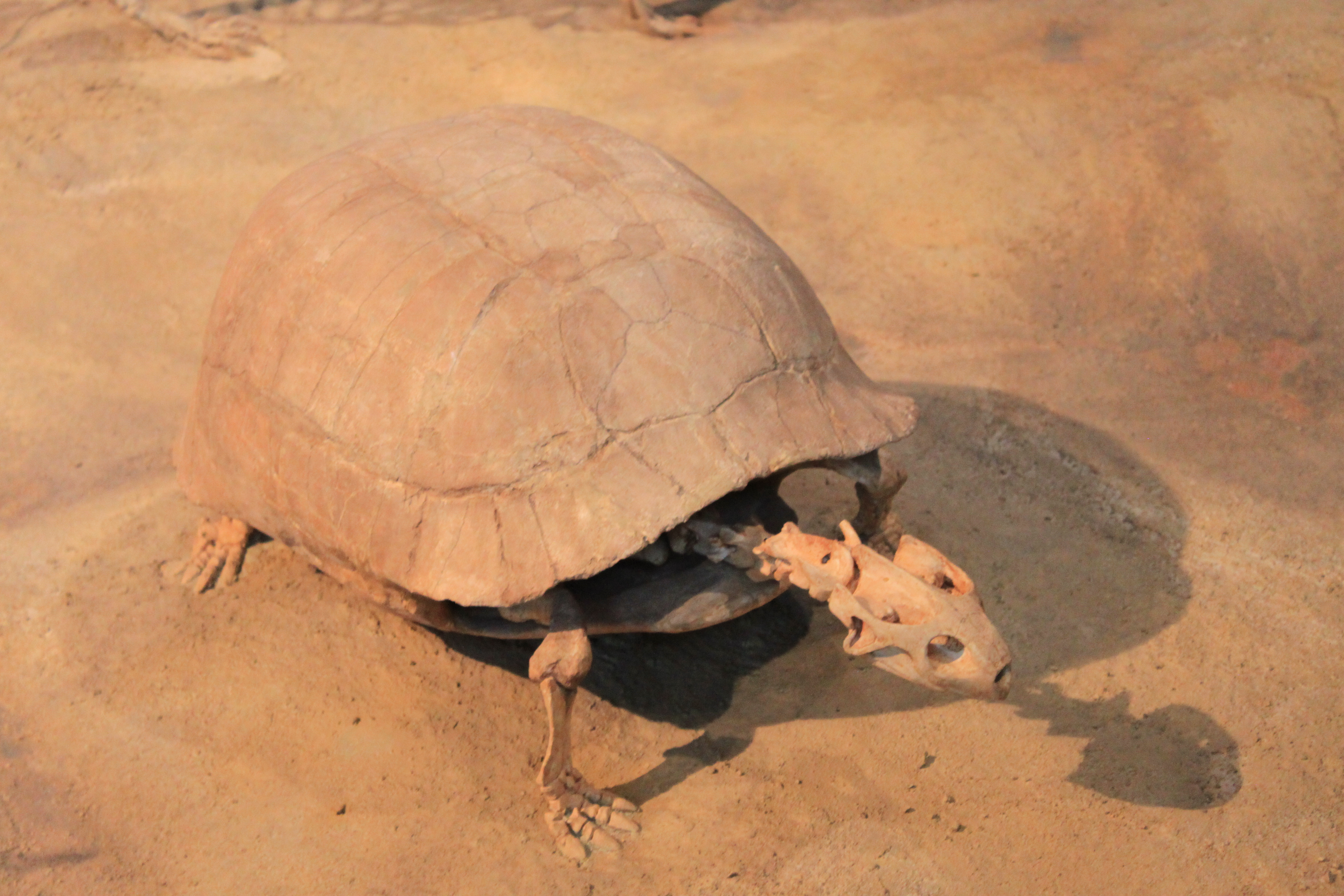
- Mounted fossilized skeleton of the Eocene-Oligocene tortoise Stylemys
  †Stylemys
- Subcancilla
  - †Subcancilla sulcata
- †Subhyracodon
- Succinea
- Sula
- †Syllomus – or unidentified comparable form
- Sylvilagus
  - †Sylvilagus audubonii
  - †Sylvilagus bachmani
  - †Sylvilagus floridanus
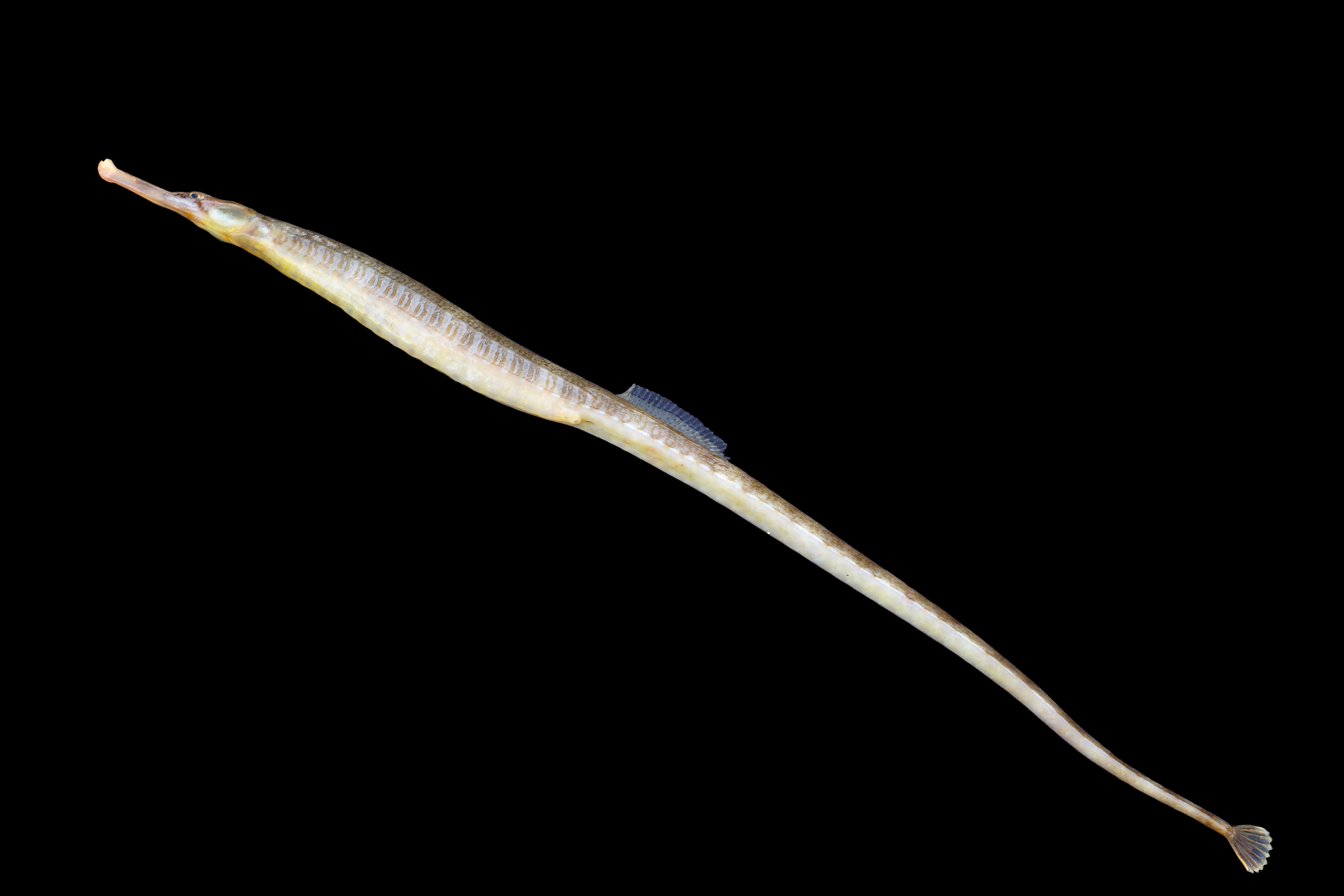
- A living Syngnathus pipefish
  Syngnathus
- Synthliboramphus
  - †Synthliboramphus antiquus
  - †Synthliboramphus hypoleucus
- †Tabernaemontana
- Tadorna
  - †Tadorna tadorna
- Tagelus
  - †Tagelus californianus
  - †Tagelus subteres
- Tamias
- Tamiasciurus
  - †Tamiasciurus hudsonicus
- †Tanymykter
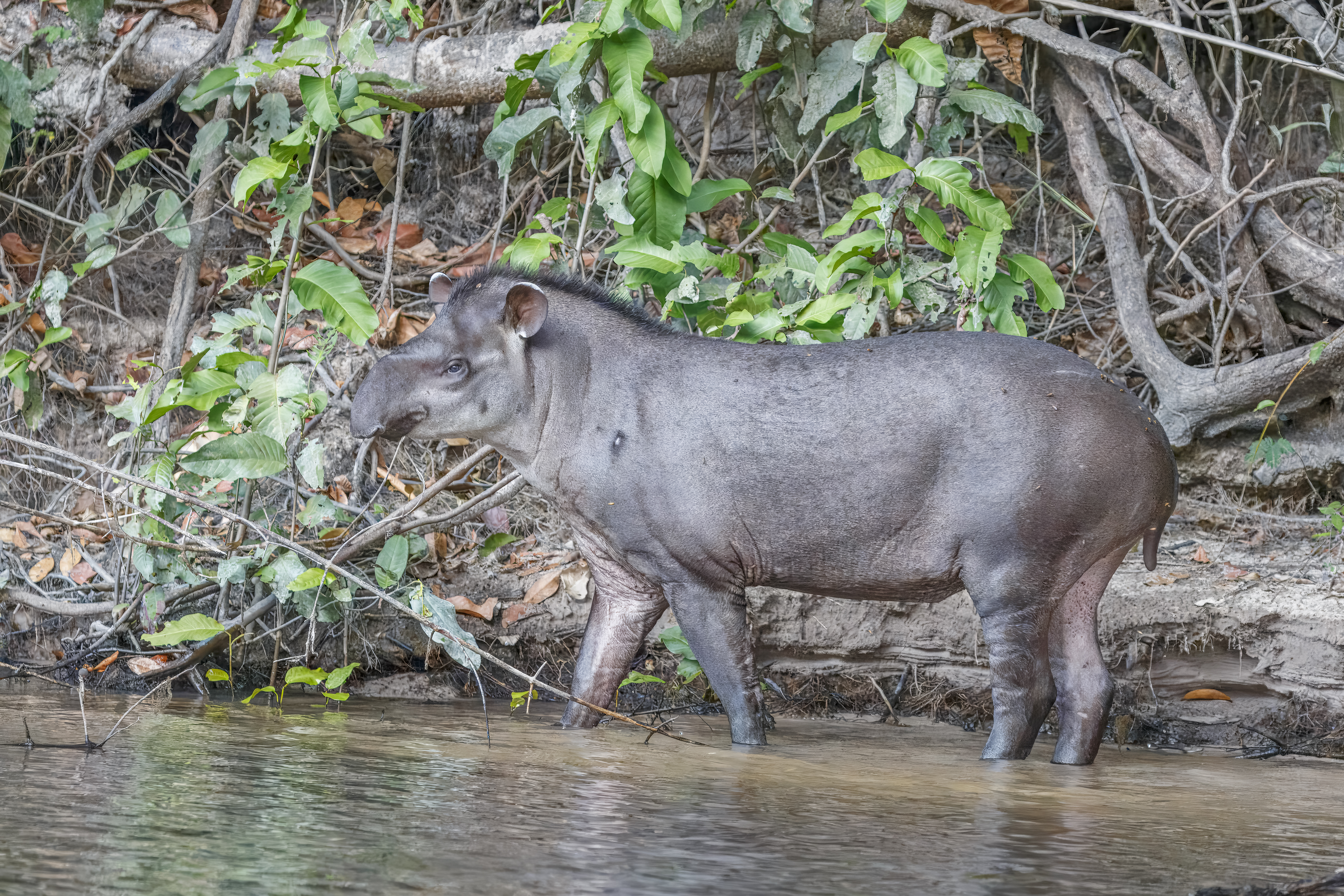
- A living Tapirus, or tapir
  Tapirus
  - †Tapirus californicus
  - †Tapirus merriami – type locality for species
- †Tapocyon
- Taranis
- Taricha
- Taxidea
  - †Taxidea taxus
- Tayassu
- Tegula
  - †Tegula aureotincta
  - †Tegula eiseni
  - †Tegula ligulata
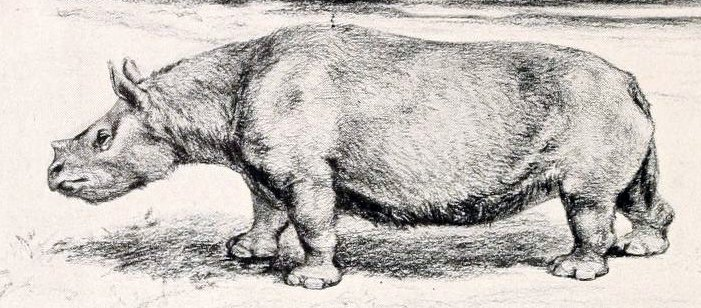
- Restoration of the Miocene-Pliocene rhinoceros Teleoceras
  †Teleoceras
- Tellina
- †Temnocyon
- Tenagodus
- †Teratornis
  - †Teratornis merriami
- Terebellum
- Terebra
  - †Terebra pedroana
  - †Terebra protexta
- Terebratula
- Teredo
- Terminalia
- †Tessarolax – tentative report
- Testudo
- †Tetraclaenodon
- †Tetrameryx
- Thais
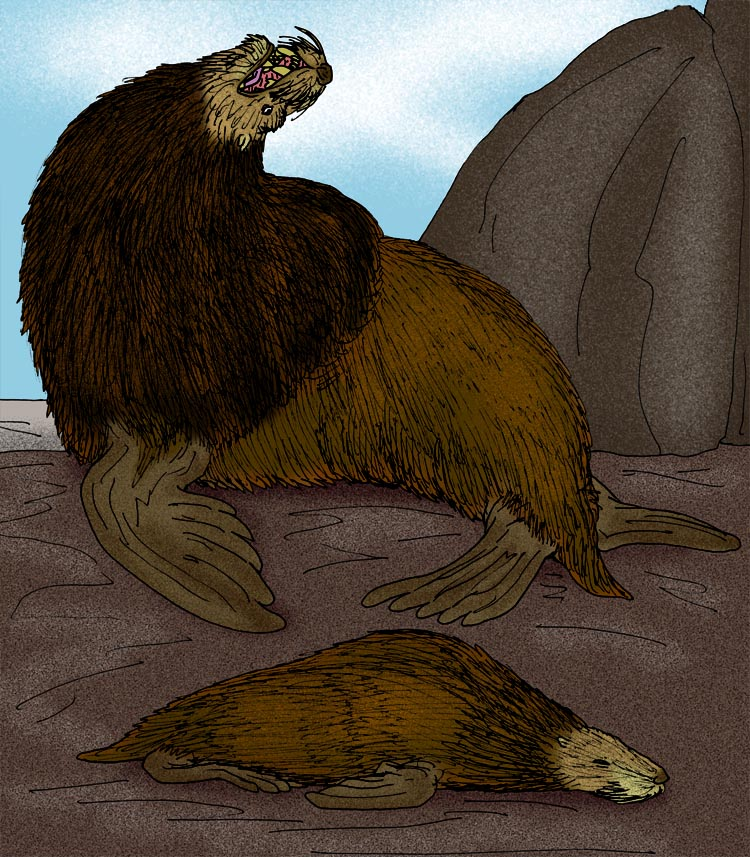
- Life restoration of the Miocene fur seal Thalassoleon
  †Thalassoleon
  - †Thalassoleon macnallyae – type locality for species
  - †Thalassoleon mexicanus
- †Thamnasteria
- Thamnophis
- Thomomys
  - †Thomomys bottae
  - †Thomomys monticola
- Thracia
- Thunnus – type locality for genus
- Thyasira
- †Thyrsites
- †Ticholeptus
- Timoclea
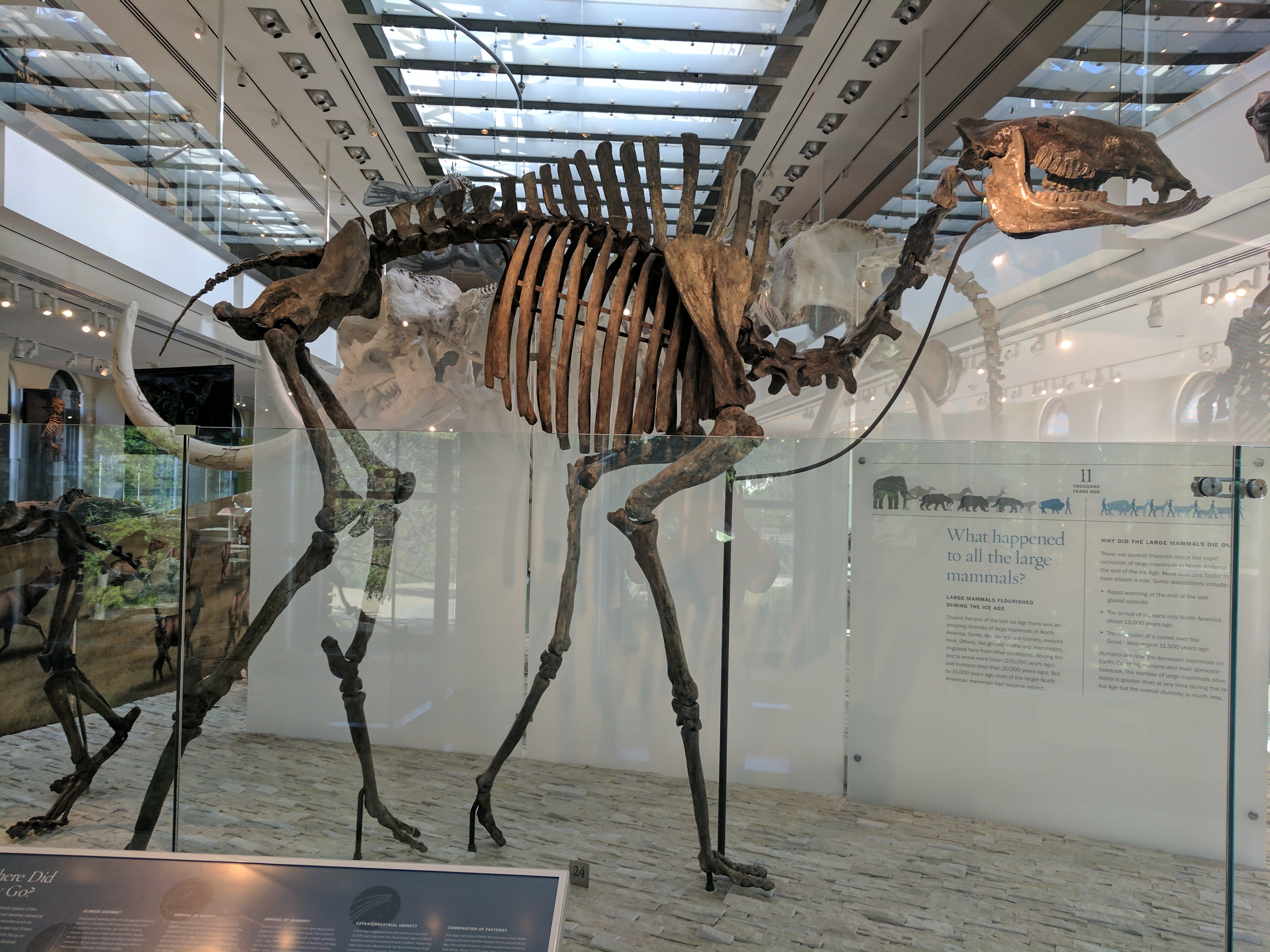
- Mounted fossilized skeleton of the Miocene-Pleistocene camel Titanotylopus
  †Titanotylopus
- Tivela
  - †Tivela stultorum
- †Tomarctus
  - †Tomarctus brevirostris
  - †Tomarctus hippophaga
- Totanus
- †Toxicodendron
- Toxopneustes
  - †Toxopneustes roseus – or unidentified comparable form
- Toxostoma
  - †Toxostoma redivivum
- Trachycardium
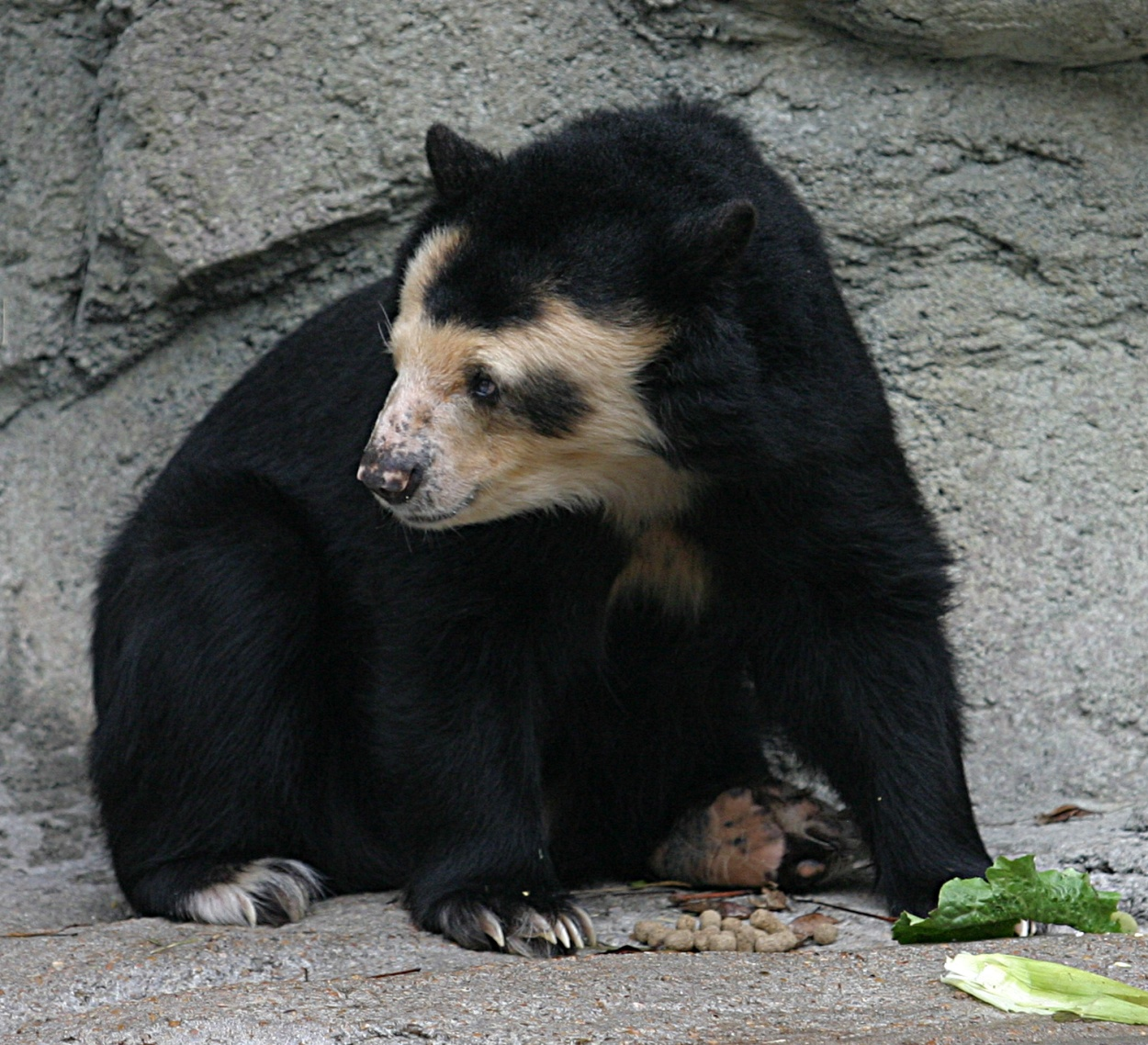
- A living Tremarctos, or spectacled bear
  Tremarctos
  - †Tremarctos floridanus
- Tresus
  - †Tresus capax
  - †Tresus nuttallii
- Triakis – tentative report
- Trichotropis
- Tricolia
  - †Tricolia pulloides
  - †Trigonictis macrodon
- Trionyx
- Triphora
- Triplofusus
  - †Triplofusus princeps
- Trochita
- †Trogosus
- Trophon
- Tucetona
  - †Tucetona multicostata
- †Tunita – type locality for genus
- Turbonilla
  - †Turbonilla aepynota
  - †Turbonilla almo
  - †Turbonilla asser
  - †Turbonilla canfieldi
  - †Turbonilla carpenteri
  - †Turbonilla laminata
  - †Turbonilla pentalopha
  - †Turbonilla raymondi
  - †Turbonilla regina
  - †Turbonilla stylina
  - †Turbonilla tenuicula
  - †Turbonilla torquata
  - †Turbonilla tridentata
  - †Turbonilla weldi
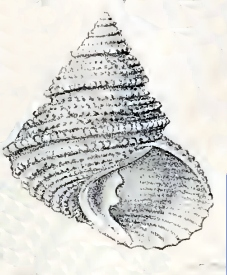
- Shell of a Turcica sea snail
  Turcica
  - †Turcica caffea
- Turdus
- †Turio
- Turricula
- Turris
- Turritella
- Turritriton
  - †Turritriton gibbosus
- Tursiops – or unidentified comparable form
- Typha
- Typhis
- Tyto
  - †Tyto (sp.)
- Uca
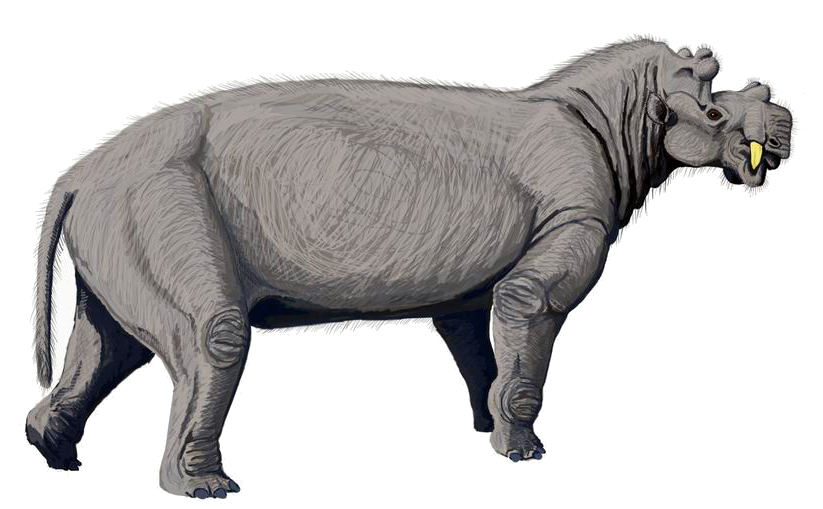
- Life restoration of the Eocene mammal Uintatherium
  †Uintatherium
- Ulmus
- †Umbellularia
- Uria
  - †Uria aalge
- †Urobatis
  - †Urobatis halleri
- †Urocitellus
  - †Urocitellus beldingi
- Urocyon
  - †Urocyon cinereoargenteus
- Urolophus
  - †Urolophus halleri – tentative report
- Ursus
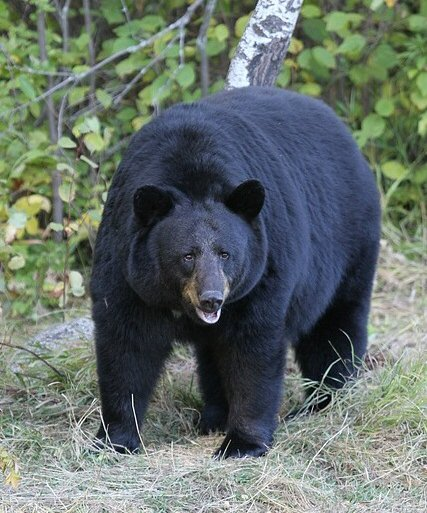
  - A living Ursus americanus, or American black bear
    †Ursus americanus
- †Ustatochoerus
- Uta
  - †Uta stansburiana
- †Valenictus – type locality for genus
  - †Valenictus chulavistensis – type locality for species
  - †Valenictus imperialensis – type locality for species
- †Vanderhoofius
- Vasum
- †Vauquelinia
- †Velates
- Velutina
  - †Velutina velutina
- Venericardia
- Venus
- Vermicularia
- Veromessor
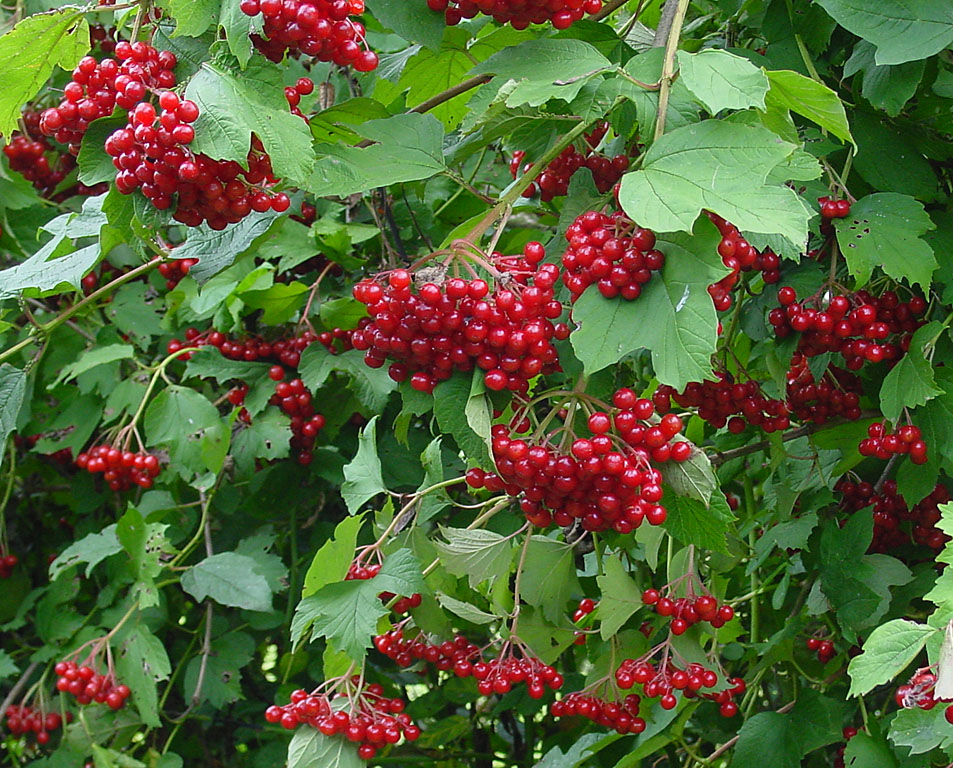
- Leaves and fruit of a living Viburnum.
  †Viburnum
- †Vireo
- Vitrinella – tentative report
- Volsella
- Voluta
- Volutopsius
- †Vouapa
- Vulpes
  - †Vulpes cascadensis
  - †Vulpes velox
- Williamia
- †Wodnika
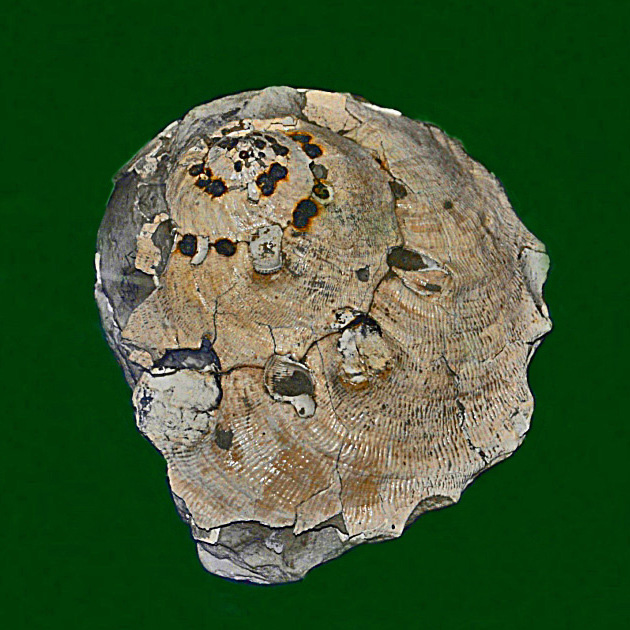
- Fossilized shell of the Late Cretaceous-modern carrier shell sea snail Xenophora
  Xenophora
- †Xyne – type locality for genus
- Yoldia
  - †Yoldia cooperii
- †Yumaceras – tentative report
- †Zachrysia
- Zalophus
  - †Zalophus californianus
- †Zamites
- †Zaphleges
  - †Zaphleges longurio
- †Zapteryx
- †Zarhinocetus
  - †Zarhinocetus errabundus – type locality for species
- Zelkova
- Zenaida
  - †Zenaida macroura
- Zonotrichia
  - †Zonotrichia leucophrys
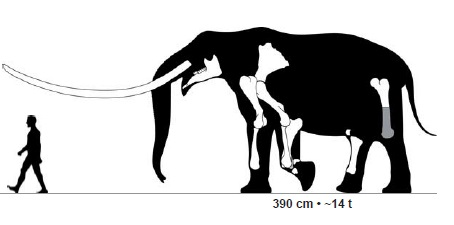
- Known material diagram depicting the Miocene-Pleistocene mastodon relative Zygolophodon with a human to scale
  †Zygolophodon
