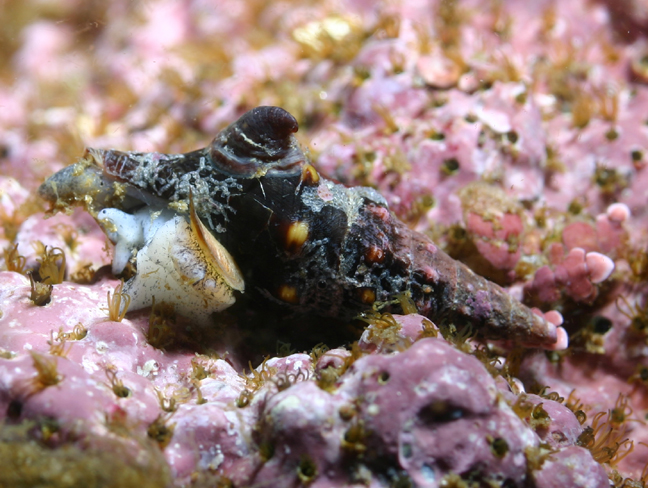
- A live individual of Pseudomelatoma torosa with an attached individual of Crepidula adunca

Scientific classification
- Kingdom: Animalia
- Phylum: Mollusca
- Class: Gastropoda
- Subclass: Caenogastropoda
- Order: Neogastropoda
- Superfamily: Conoidea
- Family: Pseudomelatomidae
- Genus: Pseudomelatoma; Dall, 1918

Type species
- Drillia penicillata Carpenter, 1865

Species
- See text

= Pseudomelatoma =

Genus of gastropods

Pseudomelatoma is a genus of predatory sea snails, marine gastropod mollusks in the family Pseudomelatomidae.

== Description ==
(Original description) There is a group of species typified by Pleurotoma penicillata Carpenter which in sculpture and periostracum closely resemble the African Melatoma but their operculum has an apical nucleus and is long and narrow. They may be called Pseudomelatoma. Melatoma Anthony, 1847, is quite a different thing.

== Species ==
Species within the genus Pseudomelatoma include:

- Pseudomelatoma eburnea (Carpenter, 1865)
- Pseudomelatoma moesta (Carpenter, 1864)
- Pseudomelatoma penicillata (Carpenter, 1864)
- Pseudomelatoma sticta S. S. Berry, 1956
- Pseudomelatoma torosa (Carpenter, 1864)

Species brought into synonymy

- Pseudomelatoma grippi (Dall, 1919): synonym of Ophiodermella grippi (Dall, 1919)
- Pseudomelatoma redondoensis T. Burch, 1938: synonym of Burchia semiinflata (Grant & Gale, 1931) (original combination)
