= Perimangelia nitens =

Scientific classification
- Kingdom: Animalia
- Phylum: Mollusca
- Class: Gastropoda
- Subclass: Caenogastropoda
- Order: Neogastropoda
- Superfamily: Conoidea
- Family: Mangeliidae
- Genus: Perimangelia
- Species: P. nitens

Binomial name
- Perimangelia nitens (Carpenter, 1864)

Synonyms
- Mangelia pulchrior Dall, W.H., 1921; Mangelia (variegata) nitens Carpenter, 1864 (original combination); Perimangelia variegata nitens (Carpenter, 1864)

Species of gastropod

Perimangelia nitens is a species of sea snail, a marine gastropod mollusk in the family Mangeliidae.

== Description ==
The shell is similar to Clathromangelia variegata (Carpenter, 1864), but it has a chestnut and a white band.

== Distribution ==
This marine species occurs off Northwest USA, from Monterey, California, to Magdalena Bay, Lower California
