= Ophiodermella cancellata =

Scientific classification
- Kingdom: Animalia
- Phylum: Mollusca
- Class: Gastropoda
- Subclass: Caenogastropoda
- Order: Neogastropoda
- Superfamily: Conoidea
- Family: Borsoniidae
- Genus: Ophiodermella
- Species: O. cancellata

Binomial name
- Ophiodermella cancellata (Carpenter, 1864)

Synonyms
- Drillia cancellata Carpenter, 1864 (original combination); † Moniliopsis chacei Berry, 1941; Moniliopsis rhines Dall, 1919; Pleurotoma rhines Dall, W.H., 1908 (unnecessary nom. nov. pro Drillia cancellata Carpenter, 1864); Pleurotoma vancouverensis Smith, E.A., 1880; Surcula rhines Dall, 1908

Species of gastropod

Ophiodermella cancellata is a species of sea snail, a marine gastropod mollusk in the family Borsoniidae.

== Description ==
The shell resembles a young Ophiodermella inermis in form. The spire is decorticated with four planate whorls remaining. The suture is distinct. The sculpture of the shell shows about twenty small longitudinal ribs crossed by close revolving striae, cancellating the surface, and sometimes the intersections are subnodulous.

It is a vermivore, but it feeds mainly on an oweniid polychaete, Galathowenia oculata (Zachs, 1923)

== Distribution ==
This species occurs in the Pacific Ocean from British Columbia, Canada to Washington, USA
