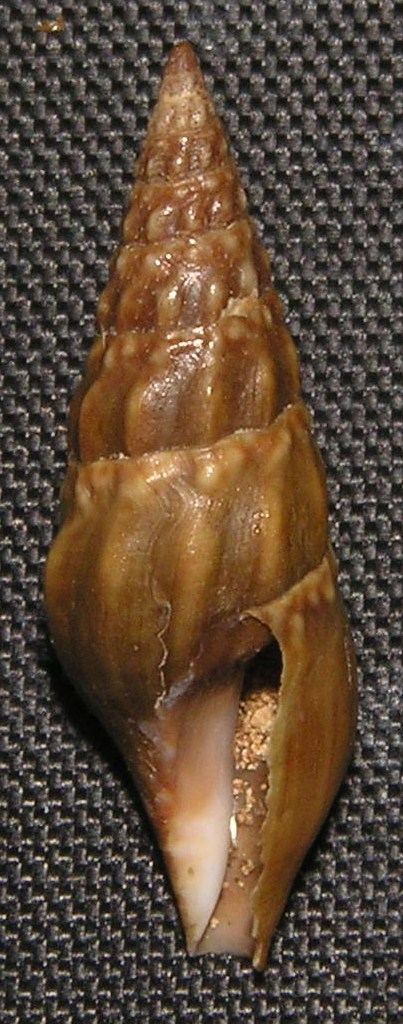
- Shell of Pseudomelatoma penicillata

Scientific classification
- Kingdom: Animalia
- Phylum: Mollusca
- Class: Gastropoda
- Subclass: Caenogastropoda
- Order: Neogastropoda
- Superfamily: Conoidea
- Family: Pseudomelatomidae
- Genus: Pseudomelatoma
- Species: P. penicillata

Binomial name
- Pseudomelatoma penicillata (Carpenter, 1864)

Synonyms
- Drillia digna Smith, E.A.; Drillia eburnea Carpenter, 1864; Drillia eburneola Dall, W.H., 1890; Drillia inermis Hinds; Drillia moesta maculata Williamson, M.B., 1905; Drillia penicillata Carpenter, 1864 (original combination); Pleurotoma penicillata Carpenter, 1864

= Pseudomelatoma penicillata =

Species of gastropod

Pseudomelatoma penicillata, common name the doleful turrid, is a species of small sea snail, a marine gastropod mollusk in the family Pseudomelatomidae.

The variety † Pseudomelatoma penicillata var. semiinflata Grant & Gale, 1931: synonym of Burchia semiinflata (Grant & Gale, 1931)

== Description ==
The length of the shell varies between 30 mm and 47 mm.

== Distribution ==
This marine species occurs off California, United States, and in the Sea of Cortez, Western Mexico.
