= B. spectabilis =

B. spectabilis may refer to:

- Barkeria spectabilis, an orchid species
- Bledius spectabilis, a beetle species
- Boerlagella spectabilis, a flowering plant species
- Bougainvillea spectabilis, a flowering plant species
- Bowenia spectabilis, a cycad species
- Brachychiton spectabilis, a tree species
- Buccochromis spectabilis, a fish species
- Bucculatrix spectabilis, a moth species
- Burchia spectabilis, a sea snail species
