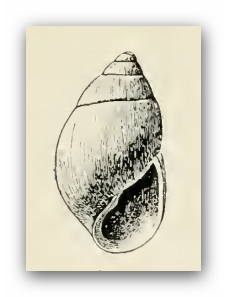
- Apertural view of the shell of Odostomia nuciformis

Scientific classification
- Kingdom: Animalia
- Phylum: Mollusca
- Class: Gastropoda
- Family: Pyramidellidae
- Genus: Odostomia
- Species: O. nuciformis

Binomial name
- Odostomia nuciformis Carpenter, 1864

Synonyms
- Aartsenia orcia Carpenter, 1864; Aartsenia nuciformis Dall & Bartsch, 1909; Odostomia (Amaura) orcia Carpenter, 1864; Odostomia (Amaura) nuciformis Dall and Bartsch, 1909

= Odostomia nuciformis =

Species of gastropod

Odostomia nuciformis is a species of sea snail, a marine gastropod mollusc in the family Pyramidellidae, the pyrams and their allies.

== Description ==
The large, shortly ovate shell is yellowish to milk-white. Its length measures 7.7 mm. The whorls of the protoconch are deeply immersed; only half of the last turn is seen in tilted position when viewed from above. The five whorls of the teleoconch are increasing rapidly' in size. They are well rounded, having their summits closely appressed to the preceding whorl. The suture is moderately well impressed. The periphery and the base of the body whorl are well rounded. The ovate aperture is rather large, and white within. The posterior angle is acute. The outer lip is moderately thin at the edge but thicker within. The columella is short, strongly curved and with a strong oblique fold at its insertion. It is reinforced by the attenuated base. The parietal wall is covered by a thin callus.

== Distribution ==
This species occurs in the Pacific Ocean off Washington, USA
