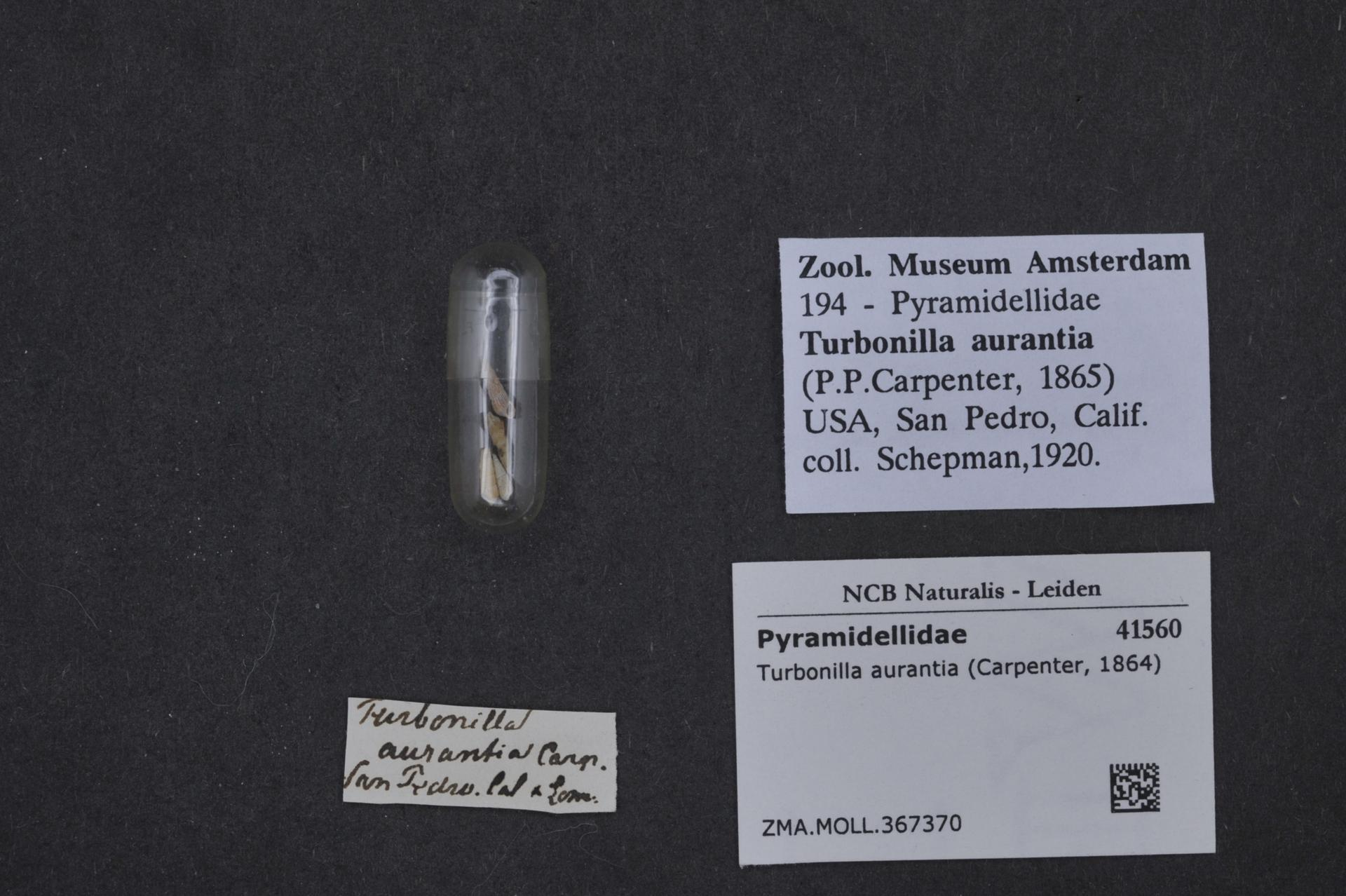
- Turbonilla aurantia

Scientific classification
- Kingdom: Animalia
- Phylum: Mollusca
- Class: Gastropoda
- Family: Pyramidellidae
- Genus: Turbonilla
- Species: T. aurantia

Binomial name
- Turbonilla aurantia (Carpenter, 1864)

= Turbonilla aurantia =

Species of gastropod

Turbonilla aurantia is a species of sea snail, a marine gastropod mollusk in the family Pyramidellidae, the pyrams and their allies.
