= Gibberula subtrigona =

Scientific classification
- Kingdom: Animalia
- Phylum: Mollusca
- Class: Gastropoda
- Subclass: Caenogastropoda
- Order: Neogastropoda
- Family: Cystiscidae
- Subfamily: Cystiscinae
- Genus: Gibberula
- Species: G. subtrigona

Binomial name
- Gibberula subtrigona (Carpenter, 1864)

Synonyms
- Granula subtrigona (Carpenter, 1864)

Species of gastropod

Gibberula subtrigona is a species of sea snail, a marine gastropod mollusk, in the family Cystiscidae.
