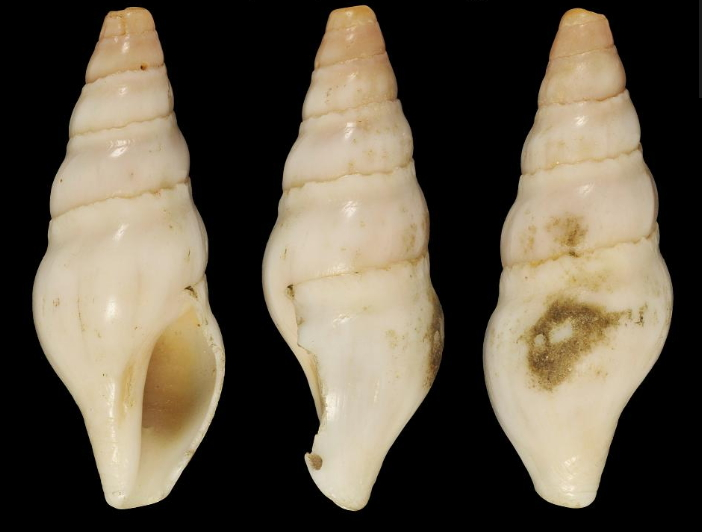
- Shell of Pseudomelatoma eburnea (holotype at the Smithsonian Institution)

Scientific classification
- Kingdom: Animalia
- Phylum: Mollusca
- Class: Gastropoda
- Subclass: Caenogastropoda
- Order: Neogastropoda
- Superfamily: Conoidea
- Family: Pseudomelatomidae
- Genus: Pseudomelatoma
- Species: P. eburnea

Binomial name
- Pseudomelatoma eburnea (Carpenter, 1865)

Synonyms
- Drillia eburnea .P.P. Carpenter, 1865; Pseudomelatoma (Laevitectum) eburnea (Carpenter, 1865)

= Pseudomelatoma eburnea =

Species of gastropod

Pseudomelatoma eburnea is a species of small sea snail, a marine gastropod mollusk in the family Pseudomelatomidae.

== Description ==
The length of the shell attains 30 mm.

The turreted shell is pinkish white, rather thin, smooth and shining. The spire is decollated. There are nine normal whorls remaining, planate above, appressed above the sutures and medianly concave, with here and there obsolete irregular longitudinal ribs. The base of the shell is prolonged, with a conspicuous, open siphonal canal.

This species is easily recognized by its smooth, glossy aspect and French-white color. The notch lying along a broad spiral channel, which throws the junction of the whorl as it were up the suture.

== Distribution ==
This marine species occurs in the Sea of Cortez, Western Mexico.
