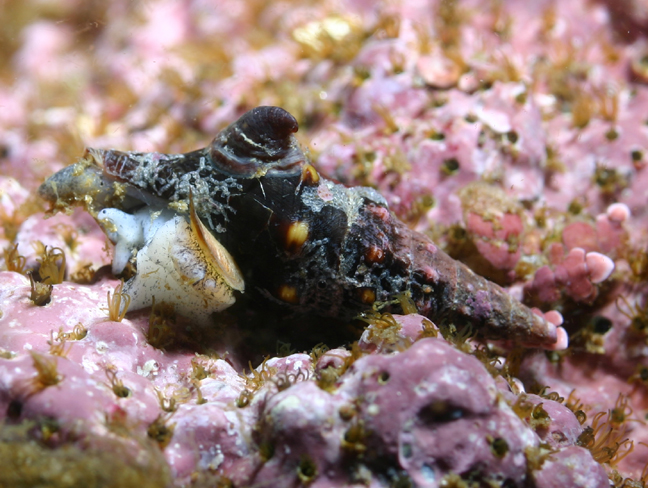
- A live individual of Pseudomelatoma torosa with an attached individual of Crepidula adunca on top

Scientific classification
- Kingdom: Animalia
- Phylum: Mollusca
- Class: Gastropoda
- Subclass: Caenogastropoda
- Order: Neogastropoda
- Superfamily: Conoidea
- Family: Pseudomelatomidae
- Genus: Pseudomelatoma
- Species: P. torosa

Binomial name
- Pseudomelatoma torosa (Carpenter, 1864)

Synonyms
- Drillia torosa Carpenter, 1864 (original combination)

= Pseudomelatoma torosa =

Species of gastropod

Pseudomelatoma torosa is a species of predatory sea snail, a marine gastropod mollusk in the family Pseudomelatomidae.

Subspecies

- Pseudomelatoma torosa aurantia Carpenter, 1864

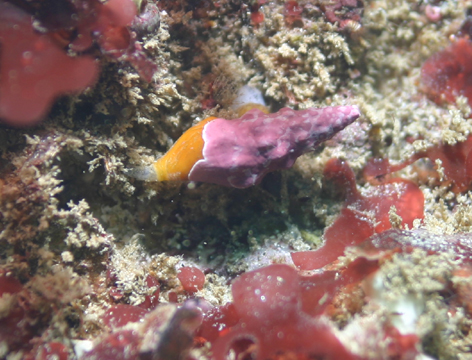
A live Pseudomelatoma torosa in situ, the shell encrusted with pink coralline algae

== Description ==
The whorls show an angulated shoulder bearing nodulous terminations of about ten short oblique ribs. There is no spiral sculpture. The color of the shell is burnt-brown, under an olivaceous epidermis. The nodules are whitish. The aperture is brown.

The shell of the subspecies P. t. aurantia is orange-colored, sometimes spirally striate.

== Distribution ==
This marine species occurs off southern California, United States.
