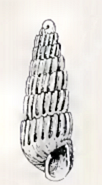
- Drawing of a shell of Turbonilla muricata

Scientific classification
- Kingdom: Animalia
- Phylum: Mollusca
- Class: Gastropoda
- Family: Pyramidellidae
- Genus: Turbonilla
- Species: T. muricata

Binomial name
- Turbonilla muricata (Carpenter, 1857)

Synonyms
- Chemnitzia muricata Carpenter, 1856 (basionym); Turbonilla (Chemnitzia) muricata (Carpenter, 1857)

= Turbonilla muricata =

Species of gastropod

Turbonilla muricata is a species of sea snail, a marine gastropod mollusk in the family Pyramidellidae, the pyrams and their allies.

== Description ==
The milk-white shell has an elongate-conic shape. Its length measures 2.3 mm. The three whorls of the protoconch form an elevated helicoid spire, whose axis is at right angles to that of the succeeding turns, in the first of which it is almost half immersed. The seven whorls of the teleoconch are moderately rounded, somewhat contracted at the suture, and strongly shouldered at the summit. They are marked by very strong, slightly protractive axial ribs, of which 14 occur upon the first to fourth and 16 upon the remaining turns. These ribs extend prominently to the summit which they render muricated. The intercostal spaces are as wide as the ribs, deeply impressed, and terminating at the periphery. The sutures are very strongly marked. The periphery and the base of the body whorl are well rounded and smooth. The aperture is rhomboidal. The posterior angle is obtuse. The outer lip is thin, showing the external sculpture within. The columella is slender, slightly twisted and curved.

== Distribution ==
The type specimen was found in the Pacific Ocean off Mazatlán, Mexico.
