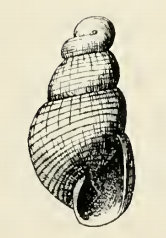
- Apertural view of a shell of Odostomia intermedia

Scientific classification
- Kingdom: Animalia
- Phylum: Mollusca
- Class: Gastropoda
- Family: Pyramidellidae
- Genus: Odostomia
- Species: O. intermedia

Binomial name
- Odostomia intermedia (Carpenter, 1857)

= Odostomia intermedia =

Species of gastropod

Odostomia intermedia is a species of sea snail, a marine gastropod mollusc in the family Pyramidellidae, the pyrams and their allies.

== Description ==
The white shell is elongate-ovate. Its length measures 1.4 mm. The 2 ½ whorls of the protoconch are large and form a depressed helicoid spire, whose axis is at right angles to that of the succeeding turns, in the first of which it is about one-fifth immersed. The three whorls of the teleoconch are well rounded. They are marked by very much enfeebled indications of axial ribs, which are best shown at the summit of the whorls, and broad low spiral lirations, of which 7 occur between the sutures. The periphery and the base of the body whorl are well rounded. They are marked by eight low spiral cords, which are somewhat closer spaced about the umbilicus. The aperture is oval. The outer lip is thin, showing the external sculpture within. The columella is slender and curved.

== Distribution ==
The type specimen was found in the Pacific Ocean off Mazatlán, Mexico.
