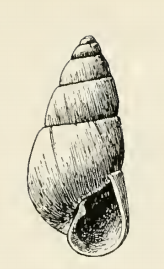
- Apertural view of a shell of Odostomia gouldii

Scientific classification
- Kingdom: Animalia
- Phylum: Mollusca
- Class: Gastropoda
- Family: Pyramidellidae
- Genus: Odostomia
- Species: O. gouldii

Binomial name
- Odostomia gouldii Carpenter, 1864

Synonyms
- Aartsenia gouldii Carpenter, 1864

= Odostomia gouldii =

Species of gastropod

Odostomia gouldii is a species of sea snail, a marine gastropod mollusc in the family Pyramidellidae, the pyrams and their allies.

== Description ==
The elongate-conic shell is of medium size, measuring 6.1 mm. It is yellowish-white, the exterior surface marked by irregular tumescences, giving it a much worn appearance. The three whorls of the protoconch are deeply immersed, having their axis at about a right angle to the axis of the succeeding turns. The six whorls of the teleoconch are moderately well rounded and faintly shouldered at the summit. The sutures are simple and well marked. The periphery and the base of the body whorl is well rounded, the latter somewhat elongated. The umbilicus is faint. The pyriform aperture is quite large. The posterior angle is obtuse. The outer lip is moderately thick. The columella is very oblique, fairly strong, revolute, with a strong fold somewhat anterior to its insertion. The parietal wall is covered with a fairly strong callus.

== Distribution ==
This species occurs in the Pacific Ocean off Washington (state)
