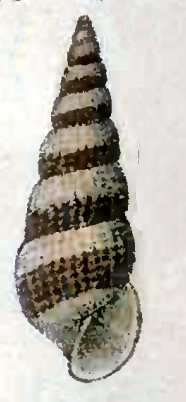
- Drawing of a shell of Turbonilla laminata

Scientific classification
- Kingdom: Animalia
- Phylum: Mollusca
- Class: Gastropoda
- Family: Pyramidellidae
- Genus: Turbonilla
- Species: T. laminata

Binomial name
- Turbonilla laminata (Carpenter, 1864)

= Turbonilla laminata =

Species of gastropod

Turbonilla laminata is a species of sea snail, a marine gastropod mollusk in the family Pyramidellidae, the pyrams and their allies.

== Description ==
The shell has the shape of an elongate cone. Its length measures 6.25 mm. Its color is yellowish or fulvous, more or less distinctly narrowly fasciate with lighter color on the spire, and bifasciate on the body whorl. The protoconch contains two whorls. The eight whorls of the teleoconch are convex. They contain a deep suture. They are longitudinally and spirally ribbed. The interstices of the decussations appear as pitted. On the body whorl the longitudinal sculpture becomes evanescent below the periphery

== Distribution ==
This species occurs in the Pacific Ocean off San Diego, California.
