= Odostomia clausiliformis =

Scientific classification
- Kingdom: Animalia
- Phylum: Mollusca
- Class: Gastropoda
- Family: Pyramidellidae
- Genus: Odostomia
- Species: O. clausiliformis

Binomial name
- Odostomia clausiliformis Carpenter, 1856

Synonyms
- Chrysallida clausiliformis Carpenter, 1856; Odostomia (Lysacme) clausiliformis Carpenter, 1856

Species of gastropod

Odostomia clausiliformis is a species of sea snail, a marine gastropod mollusc in the family Pyramidellidae, the pyrams and their allies.

== Description ==
The shell is clausiliform. Its length measures 3.8 mm. The two whorls of the protoconch form a depressed helicoid spire, whose axis is at right angles to that of the succeeding turns, in the first of which it is scarcely at all immersed. The first 2½ whorls of the seven of the teleoconch are loosely coiled, strongly rounded, smooth and separated by very strongly impressed sutures. The remaining whorls are moderately rounded, with a strong spiral cord at the summit and another one at the periphery, the two being closely appressed at the sutures. The base of the shell is prolonged, marked by low spiral cords. The aperture are irregularly oblong, decidedly effuse anteriorly. The columella is provided with a strong fold at its insertion. The operculum is paucispiral.

== Distribution ==
This species occurs in the Pacific Ocean off Mazatlán, Mexico.
