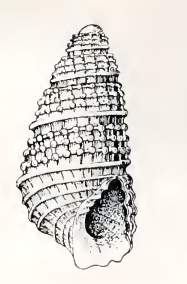
- Apertural view of the shell of Odostomia fasciata

Scientific classification
- Kingdom: Animalia
- Phylum: Mollusca
- Class: Gastropoda
- Family: Pyramidellidae
- Genus: Odostomia
- Species: O. fasciata

Binomial name
- Odostomia fasciata Carpenter, 1856

Synonyms
- Chrysallida fasciata Carpenter, 1856

= Odostomia fasciata =

Species of gastropod

Odostomia fasciata is a species of sea snail, a marine gastropod mollusc in the family Pyramidellidae, the pyrams and their allies.

== Description ==
The elongate-ovate shell is white. Its length measures 2.1 mm. The whorls of the protoconch are small, obliquely immersed in the first of the succeeding turns. The five whorls of the teleoconch are moderately rounded, ornamented by decidedly retractive axial ribs which practically terminate at the posterior edge of the supraperipheral spiral keel. Of these ribs, 12 occur upon the first, 14 upon the second, 18 upon the third, and 22 upon the penultimate turn. In addition to these ribs the whorls are marked by four spiral keels between the sutures which equal the ribs in strength and render the three anterior to the summit tuberculated at their junction, the fourth one being smooth. The sutures are strongly channeled. The periphery of the body whorl is marked by a groove. The base of the shell is well rounded, marked by six slender spiral keels, which are a little less strongly developed and more closely spaced at the umbilical area than at the periphery. The grooves separating these keels are about twice as wide as the keels, crossed by slender axial threads which correspond to the ribs. The aperture is ovate, somewhat effuse anteriorly. The posterior angle is obtuse. The outer lip is sinuous, thin and shows the external sculpture within. The columella is moderately strong, reflected, and provided with a slender fold at its insertion. The parietal wall is glazed with a thin callus.

== Distribution ==
This species occurs in the Pacific Ocean off Mazatlán, Baja California.
