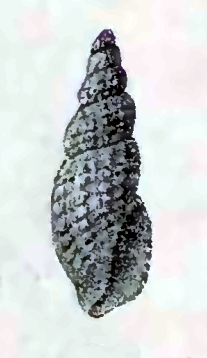
- Perimangelia interfossa

Scientific classification
- Kingdom: Animalia
- Phylum: Mollusca
- Class: Gastropoda
- Subclass: Caenogastropoda
- Order: Neogastropoda
- Superfamily: Conoidea
- Family: Mangeliidae
- Genus: Perimangelia; McLean, 2000

Type species
- Mangelia interfossa Carpenter, 1864

Species
- See text

= Perimangelia =

Genus of gastropods

Perimangelia is a genus of sea snails, marine gastropod mollusks in the family Mangeliidae.

== Species ==
- Perimangelia interfossa (Carpenter, 1864)
- Perimangelia nitens (Carpenter, 1864)
