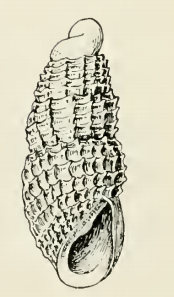
- Apertural view of a shell of Odostomia photis

Scientific classification
- Kingdom: Animalia
- Phylum: Mollusca
- Class: Gastropoda
- Family: Pyramidellidae
- Genus: Odostomia
- Species: O. photis

Binomial name
- Odostomia photis (Carpenter, 1856)

Synonyms
- Chrysallida photis Carpenter, 1856 (basionym); Haldra photis (Carpenter, 1856); Odostomia (Haldra) photis (Carpenter, 1856)

= Odostomia photis =

Species of gastropod

Odostomia photis is a species of sea snail, a marine gastropod mollusc in the family Pyramidellidae, the pyrams and their allies.

== Description ==
The white, small shell has a pupiform shape. The whorls of the protoconch number at least two. They form a depressed helicoid spire, whose axis is at right angles to that of the succeeding turns, in the first of which it is about one-half immersed. The five whorls of the teleoconch are well rounded, moderately contracted at the suture, slightly shouldered at the summit. They are marked by strongly raised, narrow, somewhat retractive axial ribs, of which 12 occur upon the first, 14 upon the second, and about 20 upon the penultimate turn. In addition to the axial ribs the whorls are marked between the sutures by five strong, narrow, spiral keels which render the intersections of the ribs cuspidate. The sutures are well impressed. The periphery and the base of the body whorl are well rounded. They are marked by the strong continuations of the axial ribs and five spiral keels, similar to those between the sutures. The aperture is pear-shaped. The outer lip is thin, showing the external sculpture within. The columella is strongly curved and revolute. It is provided with a weak fold at its insertion. The parietal wall is covered with a thin callus.

== Distribution ==
The type specimen was found in the Pacific Ocean off Mazatlán, Mexico.
