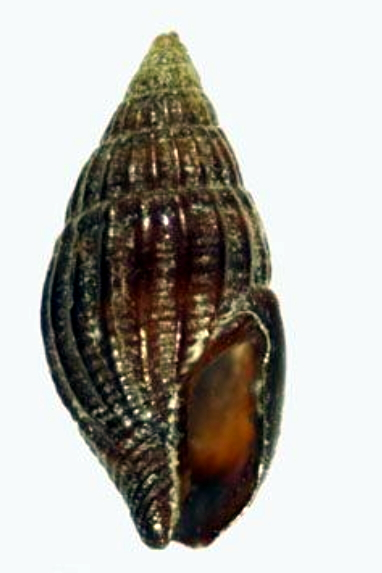
- Shell of Anachis nigrofusca (specimen at the Natural History Museum Rotterdam)

Scientific classification
- Kingdom: Animalia
- Phylum: Mollusca
- Class: Gastropoda
- Subclass: Caenogastropoda
- Order: Neogastropoda
- Family: Columbellidae
- Genus: Anachis
- Species: A. nigrofusca

Binomial name
- Anachis nigrofusca P. P. Carpenter, 1857

= Anachis nigrofusca =

Species of gastropod

Anachis nigrofusca is a species of sea snail in the family Columbellidae, the dove snails.

== Description ==
The length of the shell attains 7.8 mm.

(Original description) The shell is smaller and conoid, with the margins of the more or less elevated spire appearing excurvate. It is blackish-brown, marked with livid, radiating, somewhat undulate, and inconspicuous lines. The shell comprises six normal whorls. These are flattened and have a slightly impressed suture.

The shell features numerous radiating costules (fine ribs) that are continuous to the base, with small, spirally decussate interspaces and impressed lines. The sculpture is often obsolete. Spiral striae are conspicuous around the base.

The aperture is oblong. The outer lip is varicose, sinuate posteriorly, and is 7-dentate internally. The inner lip is conspicuous and nearly smooth. The operculum is unguiform (claw-shaped), with an anterior apex.

== Distribution ==
This species occurs in the Gulf of California and in the Pacific Ocean off Mexico.
