= Crassispira appressa =

Scientific classification
- Kingdom: Animalia
- Phylum: Mollusca
- Class: Gastropoda
- Subclass: Caenogastropoda
- Order: Neogastropoda
- Superfamily: Conoidea
- Family: Pseudomelatomidae
- Genus: Crassispira
- Species: C. appressa

Binomial name
- Crassispira appressa (Carpenter, 1864)

Synonyms
- Crassispira (Monilispira) appressa (Carpenter, 1864); Drillia appressa Carpenter, 1864

Species of gastropod

Crassispira appressa is a species of sea snail, a marine gastropod mollusk in the family Pseudomelatomidae.

== Description ==
The length of the shell varies between 7.5 mm and 12 mm.

== Distribution ==
This marine species occurs off Cabo San Lucas, Baja California, Mexico.
