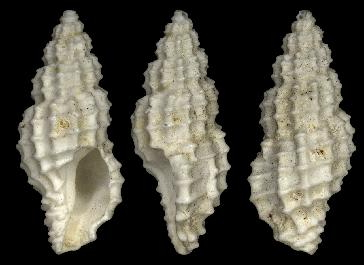
- Shells of † Clathromangelia quadrillum (museum specimens at MNHN, Paris)

Scientific classification
- Kingdom: Animalia
- Phylum: Mollusca
- Class: Gastropoda
- Subclass: Caenogastropoda
- Order: Neogastropoda
- Superfamily: Conoidea
- Family: Raphitomidae
- Genus: Clathromangelia
- Species: C. quadrillum

Binomial name
- Clathromangelia quadrillum (Dujardin, 1837)

Synonyms
- † Mangilia quadrillum Dujardin, 1837; † Pleurotoma quadrillum Dujardin, 1837

= Clathromangelia quadrillum =

Extinct species of gastropod

Clathromangelia quadrillum is an extinct species of sea snail, a marine gastropod mollusk in the family Raphitomidae.

This name has often been misapplied to the Recent Clathromangelia granum (Philippi, 1844)

== Distribution ==
This extinct species was distributed in the Mediterranean Sea, dating from the Miocene. It was also found in strata from the Late Pliocene in Malaga (Spain).
