= Turbonilla virgo =

Scientific classification
- Kingdom: Animalia
- Phylum: Mollusca
- Class: Gastropoda
- Family: Pyramidellidae
- Genus: Turbonilla
- Species: T. virgo

Binomial name
- Turbonilla virgo (Carpenter, 1864)

Species of gastropod

Turbonilla virgo is a species of sea snail, a marine gastropod mollusk in the family Pyramidellidae, the pyrams and their allies.
