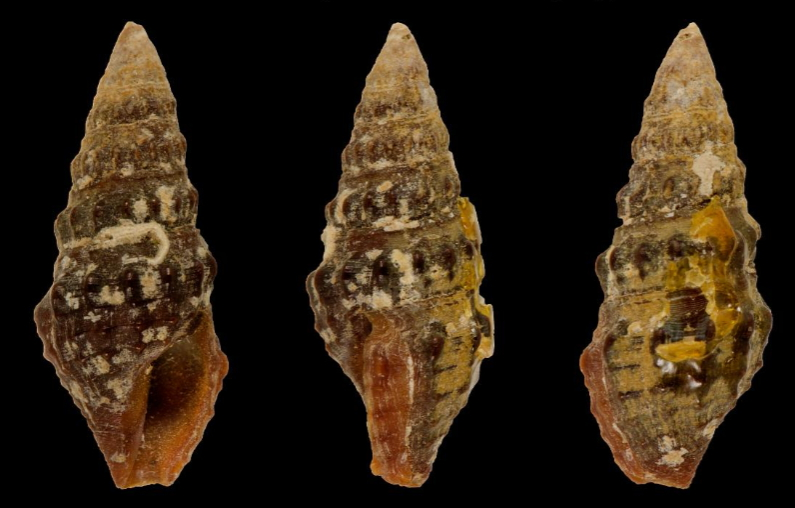
- Shell of Crassispira cerithoidea (syntype at the Smithsonian Institution)

Scientific classification
- Kingdom: Animalia
- Phylum: Mollusca
- Class: Gastropoda
- Subclass: Caenogastropoda
- Order: Neogastropoda
- Superfamily: Conoidea
- Family: Pseudomelatomidae
- Genus: Crassispira
- Species: C. cerithoidea

Binomial name
- Crassispira cerithoidea (Carpenter, 1857)

Synonyms
- Crassispira (Dallspira) cerithoidea (Carpenter, 1857); Drillia cerithoidea Carpenter, 1857

= Crassispira cerithoidea =

Species of gastropod

Crassispira cerithoidea is a species of sea snail, a marine gastropod mollusk in the family Pseudomelatomidae.

== Description ==
A medium-sized shell usually between 10 mm and 17 mm in length. The shell is of drill-like spiral construction with prominent ribs in the bends. It ranges in coloration from dark brown to black. At the base of the shell is a prominent opening from which the organism can feed, excrete waste and sense its surroundings.

== Distribution ==
This species occurs in the Pacific Ocean from Mazatlan, Mexico to Panama.
