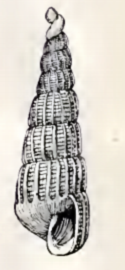
- Drawing of a shell of Turbonilla gracillima

Scientific classification
- Kingdom: Animalia
- Phylum: Mollusca
- Class: Gastropoda
- Family: Pyramidellidae
- Genus: Turbonilla
- Species: T. gracillima

Binomial name
- Turbonilla gracillima (Carpenter, 1857)

Synonyms
- Chemnitzia gracillima Carpenter, 1856 (basionym); Turbonilla (Pyrgiscus) gracillima (Carpenter, 1857)

= Turbonilla gracillima =

Species of gastropod

Turbonilla gracillima is a species of sea snail, a marine gastropod mollusk in the family Pyramidellidae, the pyrams and their allies.

== Description ==
The milk-white shell is very slender and acute, milk-white. Its length measures 3 mm. The whorls of the protoconch are prolonged, but partly lost. The eight whorls of the teleoconch are well rounded at first, and later flattened. They are moderately contracted at the periphery and slightly shouldered at the summit. They are marked by slender, almost vertical, axial ribs, of which 12 occur upon the first, 14 upon the second and third, 16 upon the fourth, 18 upon the fifth and penultimate turn. The intercostal spaces are as broad as the ribs, terminating suddenly at the periphery. They are crossed by about fourteen equal and equally spaced spiral pits, which are equal to the spaces which separate them. The periphery and the base of the body whorl are well rounded, and smooth without sculpture. The aperture is rhomboidal. The posterior angle is obtuse. The outer lip is thin. The columella is slender, and somewhat twisted.

== Distribution ==
The type specimen was found in the Pacific Ocean off Mazatlán, Baja California.
