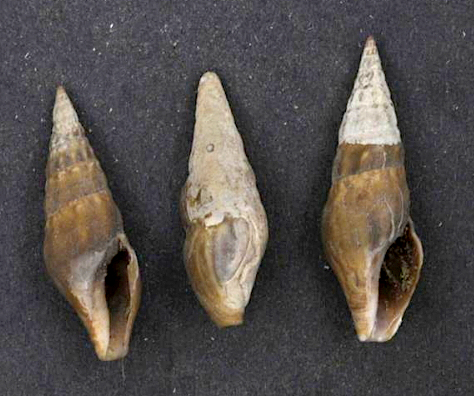
- Shells of Pseudomelatoma moesta (specimens at Naturalis Biodiversity Center)

Scientific classification
- Kingdom: Animalia
- Phylum: Mollusca
- Class: Gastropoda
- Subclass: Caenogastropoda
- Order: Neogastropoda
- Superfamily: Conoidea
- Family: Pseudomelatomidae
- Genus: Pseudomelatoma
- Species: P. moesta

Binomial name
- Pseudomelatoma moesta (Carpenter, 1864)

Synonyms
- Drillia moesta Carpenter, 1864; Pseudomelatoma moesta maculata Williamson, 1905

= Pseudomelatoma moesta =

Species of gastropod

Pseudomelatoma moesta is a species of small sea snail, a marine gastropod mollusk in the family Pseudomelatomidae.

== Description ==
The length of the shell attains 30 mm, its diameter 10 mm.

The shell is dark brown under an olivaceous epidermis, with about ten curved longitudinal ribs, obsoletely nodulous on the periphery, with the whorls usually slightly constricted above it. The ribs are generally obsolete on the body whorl of adult specimens. The suture is narrowly corded, noduled and spotted. The aperture is chocolate within.

== Distribution ==
This marine species occurs off California, United States.
