= Anachis albonodosa =

Scientific classification
- Kingdom: Animalia
- Phylum: Mollusca
- Class: Gastropoda
- Subclass: Caenogastropoda
- Order: Neogastropoda
- Family: Columbellidae
- Genus: Anachis
- Species: A. albonodosa

Binomial name
- Anachis albonodosa P. P. Carpenter, 1857

Species of gastropod

Anachis albonodosa is a species of sea snail in the family Columbellidae, the dove snails.

== Description ==
(Original description) The shell is smaller and conoid, with the margins of the spire strongly excurvate, making it narrow anteriorly. It appears whitish-greenish and is irregularly adorned with chestnut-colored zigzag spots and lines, scarcely marked with white spots below the hardly impressed suture. It comprises 3 whorls in the protoconch, which are somewhat effuse and smooth, but appear almost rugose (corrugated) due to paler color lines. The 4 normal whorls feature often subobsolete, flattened ribs, which become obsolete near the base, and have few spiral striae around the base.

The aperture is elongated, contracted, and contorted. The outer lip is arched in the middle, internally furnished with about 8 teeth, and possesses a narrow siphonal canal. The inner lip is continuous, reaching the outer lip, smooth, and scarcely projecting.

== Distribution ==
This species occurs in the Gulf of California off Mexico; also off Panama
