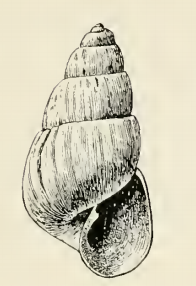
- Apertural view of a shell of Odostomia satura

Scientific classification
- Kingdom: Animalia
- Phylum: Mollusca
- Class: Gastropoda
- Family: Pyramidellidae
- Genus: Odostomia
- Species: O. satura

Binomial name
- Odostomia satura Carpenter, 1865

Synonyms
- Aartsenia satura (Carpenter, 1865); Odostomia (Amaura) satura (Carpenter, 1865)

= Odostomia satura =

Species of gastropod

Odostomia satura is a species of sea snail, a marine gastropod mollusc in the family Pyramidellidae, the pyrams and their allies.

== Description ==
The white shell has a medium size and is broadly conic. Its length measures 6.4 mm. The whorls of the protoconch number at least two. They form a depressed spire, the axis of which is almost at a right angle to the axis of the later whorls, and which is deeply, somewhat obliquely immersed in the first turn of the teleoconch . The 5½ whorls of the teleoconch are moderately well rounded, and faintly shouldered at the summit. They are marked all over by irregular rough, low, tumescenses, which simulate obsolete vertical ribs. The sutures are simple, and well marked. The periphery of the body whorl is well rounded. The base of the shell is quite short, decidedly rounded, and umbilicated. The umbilicus is partly covered by the revolute columella. The aperture is large, very broadly oval, and somewhat effuse anteriorly. The posterior angle is obtuse. The outer lip is thick. The columella is moderately strong, oblique, decidedly curved, with a decided oblique fold, situated considerably anterior to its insertion. The parietal wall is covered by a fairly thick callus.

== Distribution ==
This species occurs in the Pacific Ocean off Washington, USA
