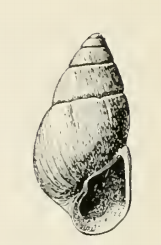
- Apertural view of a shell of Odostomia avellana

Scientific classification
- Kingdom: Animalia
- Phylum: Mollusca
- Class: Gastropoda
- Family: Pyramidellidae
- Genus: Odostomia
- Species: O. avellana

Binomial name
- Odostomia avellana Carpenter, 1864

Synonyms
- Aartsenia avellana (Carpenter, 1864); Odostomia (Amaura) avellana Carpenter, 1864

= Odostomia avellana =

Species of gastropod

Odostomia avellana is a species of sea snail, a marine gastropod mollusc in the family Pyramidellidae, the pyrams and their allies.

== Description ==
The large, elongate-ovate shell is yellowish to milk white. Its length measures 8.3 mm. The whorls of the protoconch are deeply vertically immersed. Only a part of the last volution is visible when viewed from above, their axis evidently being at a right angle to the axis of the later whorls. The five whorls of the teleoconch are increasing rapidly in size, early ones well rounded, later ones less so, their summits being closely appressed to the preceding whorl. The simple sutures are well impressed. The periphery and the base of the body whorl are well rounded, the latter somewhat elongated. The aperture islarge, ovate, somewhat effuse anteriorly, milk-white within. The posterior angle is acute. The outer lip is thin at the edge, thick within. The short columella is curved and reinforced partly by the attenuated base, having a strong oblique fold at its insertion. The parietal wall is covered by a moderately strong callus.

== Distribution ==
This species occurs in the Pacific Ocean off Vancouver Island.
