= Turbonilla prolongata =

Scientific classification
- Kingdom: Animalia
- Phylum: Mollusca
- Class: Gastropoda
- Family: Pyramidellidae
- Genus: Turbonilla
- Species: T. prolongata

Binomial name
- Turbonilla prolongata (Carpenter, 1857)

Synonyms
- Chemnitzia prolongata Carpenter, 1857

Species of gastropod

Turbonilla prolongata is a species of sea snail, a marine gastropod mollusk in the family Pyramidellidae, the pyrams and their allies.
