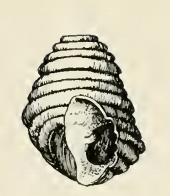
- Drawing of a shell of Odostomia ziziphina

Scientific classification
- Kingdom: Animalia
- Phylum: Mollusca
- Class: Gastropoda
- Family: Pyramidellidae
- Genus: Odostomia
- Species: O. ziziphina

Binomial name
- Odostomia ziziphina Carpenter, 1857

Synonyms
- Odostomia (Menestho) ziziphina Carpenter, 1857; Parthenia ziziphina Carpenter,1856

= Odostomia ziziphina =

Species of gastropod

Odostomia ziziphina is a species of sea snail, a marine gastropod mollusc in the family Pyramidellidae, the pyrams and their allies.

== Description ==
The minute, white shell has a conic shape. The length is 0.65 mm. The protoconch is mammillated. The whorls of the teleoconch are marked by five spiral lirations of which two appear between the sutures, one at the periphery and two on the base. The columella has an oblique fold.

== Distribution ==
The type specimen was found in the Pacific Ocean off Mazatlán, Mexico.
