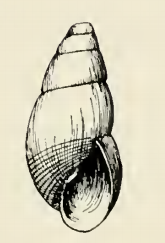
- Apertural view of the shell of Odostomia sublirulata

Scientific classification
- Kingdom: Animalia
- Phylum: Mollusca
- Class: Gastropoda
- Family: Pyramidellidae
- Genus: Odostomia
- Species: O. sublirulata

Binomial name
- Odostomia sublirulata Carpenter, 1856

Synonyms
- Menestho sublirulata (Carpenter, 1856); Odostomia (Menestho) sublirulata Carpenter 1856

= Odostomia sublirulata =

Species of gastropod

Odostomia sublirulata is a species of sea snail, a marine gastropod mollusc in the family Pyramidellidae, the pyrams and their allies.

== Description ==
The milk-white shell has an elongate-ovate shape. (Whorls of the protoconch in the type specimen ?) The five whorls of the teleoconch are moderately rounded, smooth between the well impressed sutures. The periphery of the body whorl is somewhat angulated. The base of the shell is slightly elongated, and well rounded. It is marked by seven subequal slender, raised spiral cords which are separated by channels about one-half as wide as the cords. The aperture is oval. The posterior angle is acute. The outer lip is thin, decidedly thickened within. The columella is straight, rather thick, somewhat reflected over the umbilical chink. It is provided with an oblique fold at its insertion.

== Distribution ==
This species occurs in the Pacific Ocean off Mazatlán, Mexico.
