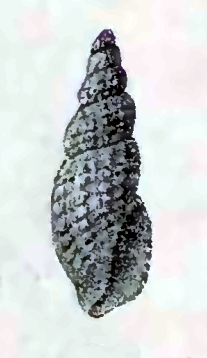
- Drawing of a shell of Perimangelia interfossa

Scientific classification
- Kingdom: Animalia
- Phylum: Mollusca
- Class: Gastropoda
- Subclass: Caenogastropoda
- Order: Neogastropoda
- Superfamily: Conoidea
- Family: Mangeliidae
- Genus: Perimangelia
- Species: P. interfossa

Binomial name
- Perimangelia interfossa (Carpenter, 1864)

Synonyms
- Mangelia interfossa Carpenter, 1864 (original combination); Mangilia interlirata Stearns, 1872

= Perimangelia interfossa =

Species of gastropod

Perimangelia interfossa is a species of sea snail, a marine gastropod mollusk in the family Mangeliidae.

== Description ==
The solid shell is dark reddish brown. It contains 8 whorls, with 8-10 strong longitudinal ribs, and 10-12 threadlike, darker colored revolving ribs in the interspaces only. The outer lip is simple and somewhat thickened.

== Distribution ==
This marine species occurs off Northwest USA.
