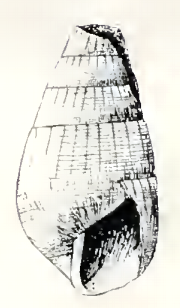
- Drawing of a (partial) shell of Turbonilla obsoleta

Scientific classification
- Kingdom: Animalia
- Phylum: Mollusca
- Class: Gastropoda
- Family: Pyramidellidae
- Genus: Turbonilla
- Species: T. obsoleta

Binomial name
- Turbonilla obsoleta (Carpenter, 1857)

Synonyms
- Eulimella ohsoleta Carpenter1856 (basionym); Turbonilla (Ptycheulimella) obsoleta (Carpenter, 1857)

= Turbonilla obsoleta =

Species of gastropod

Turbonilla obsoleta is a species of sea snail, a marine gastropod mollusk in the family Pyramidellidae, the pyrams and their allies.

== Description ==
The broadly elongate shell has a grayish white color. The type specimen has lost its early whorls, the length of the 4½ remaining whorls of the teleoconch measures 1.5 mm. The whorls of the teleoconch are feebly rounded. They are marked by obsolete axial ribs which are best shown immediately below the appressed summit. The entire surface is marked by extremely fine spiral lines. The aperture is rhomboidal. The posterior angle is acute. The outer lip is thin. The columella is slightly twisted and somewhat revolute.

== Distribution ==
The type specimen of this marine species was found off Mazatlán, Baja California peninsula.
