= Crassispira hanleyi =

Scientific classification
- Kingdom: Animalia
- Phylum: Mollusca
- Class: Gastropoda
- Subclass: Caenogastropoda
- Order: Neogastropoda
- Superfamily: Conoidea
- Family: Pseudomelatomidae
- Genus: Crassispira
- Species: C. hanleyi

Binomial name
- Crassispira hanleyi (Carpenter, 1857)

Synonyms
- Drillia hanleyi Carpenter, 1857

Species of gastropod

Crassispira hanleyi is a species of sea snail, a marine gastropod mollusk in the family Pseudomelatomidae.

== Description ==
The length of the shell attains 10 mm

This subacuminate, black shell is known by the fine costae, continued nearly to the base and the infrasutural keel.

Taxonomy and Morphology: Crassispira hanleyi was first described by Carpenter in 1857. The species is characterized by having a tall spire and a truncated anterior canal, with ribs overridden by spirals forming beads or nodules. The shell of the snail is generally subclavate and tuberculated with a thick, lengthened spire.

Related Species: The genus Crassispira includes numerous species, with C. hanleyi being one among many. Other species in the same genus, like Crassispira incrassata, Crassispira cerithina, and Crassispira chacei, share similar morphological traits but have distinct characteristics or geographic distributions.

Historical Context: The genus Crassispira has been around since the Eocene epoch, suggesting a long evolutionary history. The species name hanleyi honors Hanley, likely referring to Sylvanus Hanley, a noted British conchologist of the 19th century.

== Distribution ==
This species occurs in the Pacific Ocean from Mazatlan, Mexico to Nicaragua
