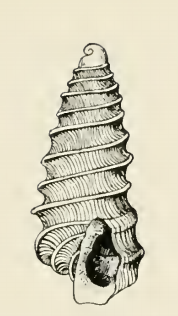
- Aperturtal view of the shell of Odostomia exarata

Scientific classification
- Kingdom: Animalia
- Phylum: Mollusca
- Class: Gastropoda
- Family: Pyramidellidae
- Genus: Odostomia
- Species: O. exarata

Binomial name
- Odostomia exarata Carpenter, 1856

Synonyms
- Miralda exarata (Carpenter, P.P., 1857); Odostomia (Miralda) exarata Carpenter, 1856; Parthenia exarata Carpenter, 1856

= Odostomia exarata =

Species of gastropod

Odostomia exarata is a species of sea snail, a marine gastropod mollusc in the family Pyramidellidae, the pyrams and their allies.

== Description ==
The elongate-ovate shell is white. Its length is 6.3 mm. The whorls of the protoconch are obliquely immersed, with only the tilted edge of the last volution visible. The five whorls of the teleoconch are marked by two spiral keels which divide the space between the sutures into three equal parts. The posterior of these keels shows weak crenulation. The periphery of the body whorl is marked by a third keel which is almost as strong as those on the spire. A fourth keel, which is considerably less strong, occupies the middle of the base. The rounded spaces between the keels are marked by feeble lines of growth. The aperture is irregularly oval. The posterior angle is obtuse. The outer lip is angulated by the keels. The columella is strong, reflected, and provided with a weak fold at insertion. The parietal wall is covered with a thin callus.

== Distribution ==
This species occurs in the Pacific Ocean off the Galapagos Islands. The type specimen was found offMazatlán, Mexico.
