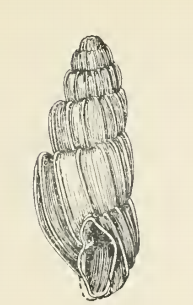
- Apertural view of the shell of Odostomia scalariformis

Scientific classification
- Kingdom: Animalia
- Phylum: Mollusca
- Class: Gastropoda
- Family: Pyramidellidae
- Genus: Odostomia
- Species: O. scalariformis

Binomial name
- Odostomia scalariformis ( Carpenter, 1856)

Synonyms
- Odostomia (Salassia) scalariformis Carpenter, 1856; Parthenia scalariformis Carpenter, 1856 (basionym)

= Odostomia scalariformis =

Species of gastropod

Odostomia scalariformis is a species of sea snail, a marine gastropod mollusc in the family Pyramidellidae, the pyrams and their allies.

== Description ==
The white shell has a pupiform shape. The length measures 5 mm. The whorls of the protoconch are small, almost completely immersed. The six whorls of the teleoconch are well rounded, scarcely at all contracted at the periphery, strongly roundedly shouldered at the summit. They are marked by slender, distant, scalariform, retractive axial ribs, of which about 20 occur upon the first and 16 upon the remaining turns. The shallow intercostal spaces are very broad. The sutures are strongly marked. The periphery and the somewhat prolonged base of the body whorl are well rounded. They are marked by the undiminished continuations of the axial ribs, which extend to the umbilical chink. The aperture is ovate. The outer lip is thin. The slender columella is curved, and provided with a moderately strong fold at its insertion. The parietal wall is covered with a thick callus.

== Distribution ==
This species occurs in the Pacific Ocean off Mazatlán, Mexico.
