= Ophiodermella ogurana =

Scientific classification
- Kingdom: Animalia
- Phylum: Mollusca
- Class: Gastropoda
- Subclass: Caenogastropoda
- Order: Neogastropoda
- Superfamily: Conoidea
- Family: Borsoniidae
- Genus: Ophiodermella
- Species: O. ogurana

Binomial name
- Ophiodermella ogurana (Yokoyama, 1922)

Synonyms
- † Genotia ogurana Yokoyama, 1922 (original combination)

Species of gastropod

Ophiodermella ogurana is a species of sea snail, a marine gastropod mollusk in the family Borsoniidae.

== Distribution ==
This rare marine species occurs off Japan in sand and muddy sand. It was originally found as a fossil from the upper Musashino of Kazusa and Shimosa, Japan.
