= Pseudomelatoma sticta =

Scientific classification
- Kingdom: Animalia
- Phylum: Mollusca
- Class: Gastropoda
- Subclass: Caenogastropoda
- Order: Neogastropoda
- Superfamily: Conoidea
- Family: Pseudomelatomidae
- Genus: Pseudomelatoma
- Species: P. sticta

Binomial name
- Pseudomelatoma sticta S. S. Berry, 1956

Species of gastropod

Pseudomelatoma sticta is a species of small sea snail, a marine gastropod mollusk in the family Pseudomelatomidae.

== Distribution ==
This marine species occurs off California, United States.
