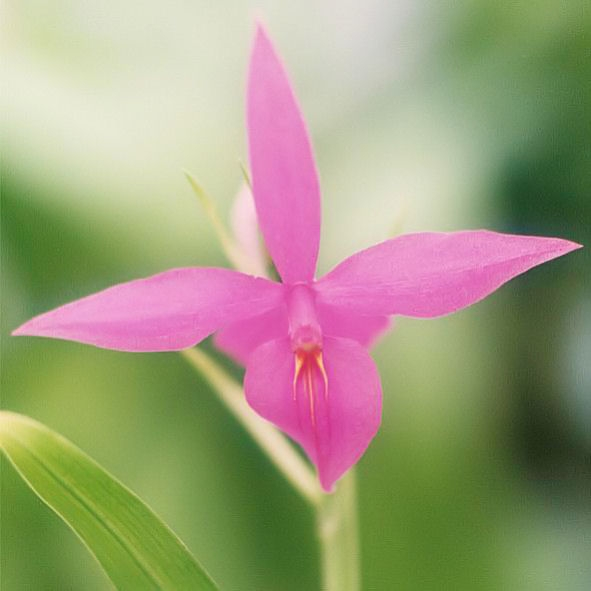
- Barkeria skinneri

Scientific classification
- Kingdom: Plantae
- Clade: Tracheophytes
- Clade: Angiosperms
- Clade: Monocots
- Order: Asparagales
- Family: Orchidaceae
- Subfamily: Epidendroideae
- Tribe: Epidendreae
- Subtribe: Laeliinae
- Genus: Barkeria; Knowles & Westc.

Type species
- Barkeria elegans Knowles & Westc.

Synonyms
- Dothilophis Raf.

= Barkeria =

Genus of orchids

Barkeria, abbreviated Bark in horticultural trade, is a genus of orchids. It consists of about 17 currently recognized (May 2014) species native to Mexico and Central America. This genus was once considered part of Epidendrum. Type species is Barkeria elegans; this is now considered a synonym of B. uniflora yet retains its status as type per ICN.

These are deciduous orchids, which drop their leaves in early winter. They are found in dry scrub areas of Mesoamerica at intermediate elevations.

== Species ==
Following species are accepted as of May 2014:

- Barkeria archilarum Chiron - Guatemala
- Barkeria barkeriola Rchb. f. - Sinaloa, Nayarit, Jalisco
- Barkeria delpinalii Archila & Chiron - Guatemala
- Barkeria dorotheae Halb - Colima, Jalisco
- Barkeria fritz-halbingeriana Soto Arenas - Oaxaca
- Barkeria lindleyana Bateman ex Lindl.
  - Barkeria lindleyana var. lindleyana - Costa Rica, El Salvador, Guatemala, Honduras
  - Barkeria lindleyana subsp. vanneriana (Rchb. f.) Thien - Puebla, Guerrero, Oaxaca
- Barkeria melanocaulon A. Rich. & Galeotti - Oaxaca
- Barkeria naevosa (Lindl.) Schltr. - Oaxaca, Guerrero
- Barkeria obovata (C. Presl) Christenson - from central Mexico to Panama
- Barkeria palmeri (Rolfe) Schltr. - Colima, Jalisco, Nayarit, Sinaloa
- Barkeria scandens (La Llave & Lex.) Dressler & Halb. - central Mexico
- Barkeria schoemakeri Halb. - Sinaloa, Michoacan, Oaxaca
- Barkeria skinneri (Bateman ex Lindl.) A. Rich. & Galeotti - Guatemala, Chiapas
- Barkeria spectabilis Bateman ex Lindl. - El Salvador, Chiapas, Guatemala, Honduras, Nicaragua
- Barkeria strophinx (Rchb. f.) Halb. - Michoacán
- Barkeria uniflora (La Llave & Lex.) Dressler & Halb. - central Mexico
- Barkeria whartoniana (C. Schweinf.) Soto Arenas - Oaxaca
