= Ophiodermella akkeshiensis =

Scientific classification
- Kingdom: Animalia
- Phylum: Mollusca
- Class: Gastropoda
- Subclass: Caenogastropoda
- Order: Neogastropoda
- Superfamily: Conoidea
- Family: Borsoniidae
- Genus: Ophiodermella
- Species: O. akkeshiensis

Binomial name
- Ophiodermella akkeshiensis (Habe, 1958)

Synonyms
- Rhodopetoma akkeshiensis Habe, 1958

Species of gastropod

Ophiodermella akkeshiensis is a species of sea snail, a marine gastropod mollusk in the family Borsoniidae.

== Distribution ==
This species occurs in the Pacific Ocean off Japan.
