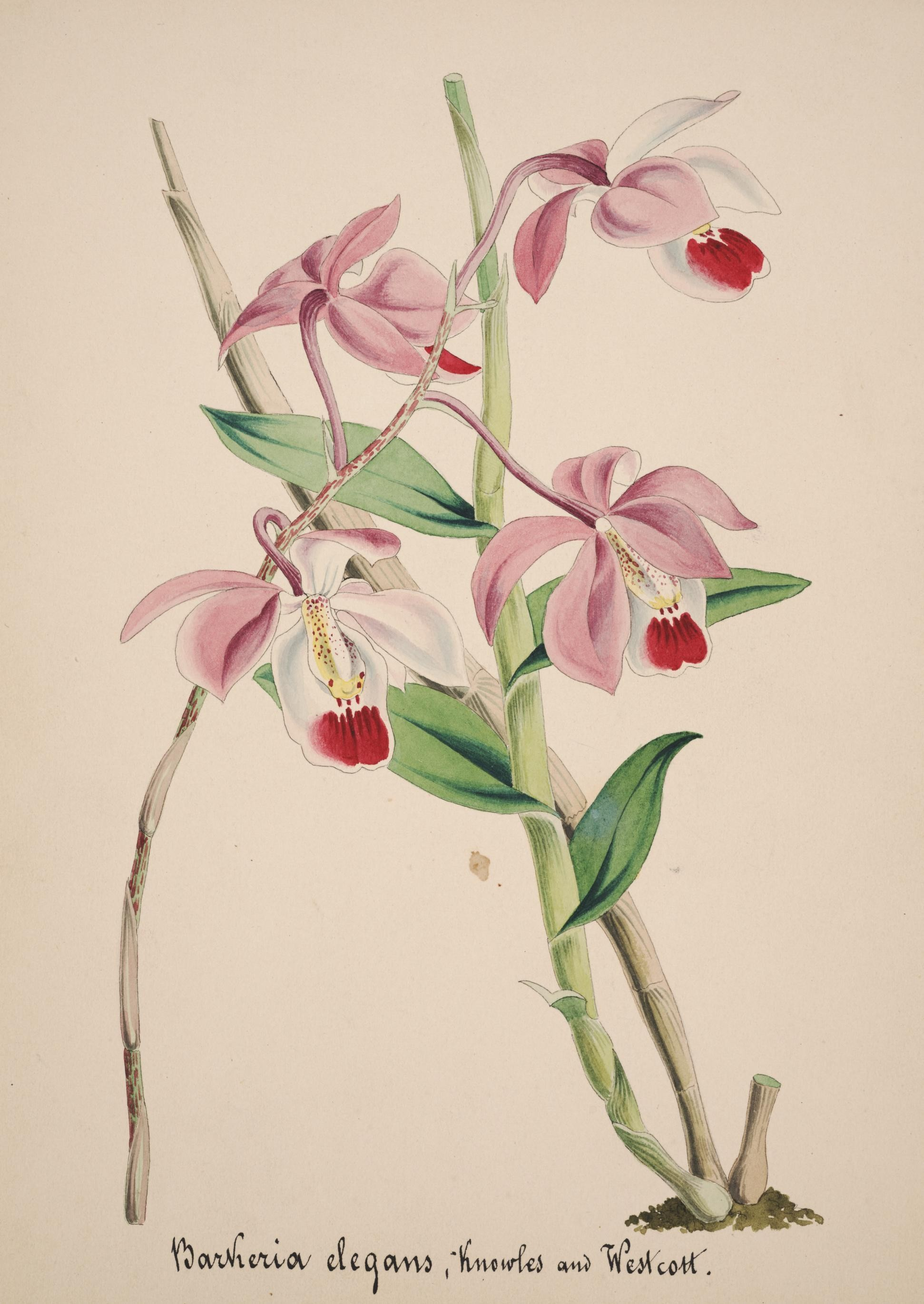
- Aquarell in "Collection d'orchidées"(Pl. 49) (as syn. Barkeria elegans).

Scientific classification
- Kingdom: Plantae
- Clade: Tracheophytes
- Clade: Angiosperms
- Clade: Monocots
- Order: Asparagales
- Family: Orchidaceae
- Subfamily: Epidendroideae
- Genus: Barkeria
- Species: B. uniflora

Binomial name
- Barkeria uniflora (La Llave & Lex.) Dressler & Halb. 1977

Synonyms
- Barkeria elegans Knowles & Westc., 1838; Epidendrum elegans (Knowles & Westc.) Rchb.f. in W.G.Walpers, 1862; Pachyphyllum uniflorum Lex. in P.de La Llave & J.M.de Lexarza, 1825

= Barkeria uniflora =

Species of orchid

Barkeria uniflora is a species of orchids. It is found in central Mexico. It is the type species of its genus.
