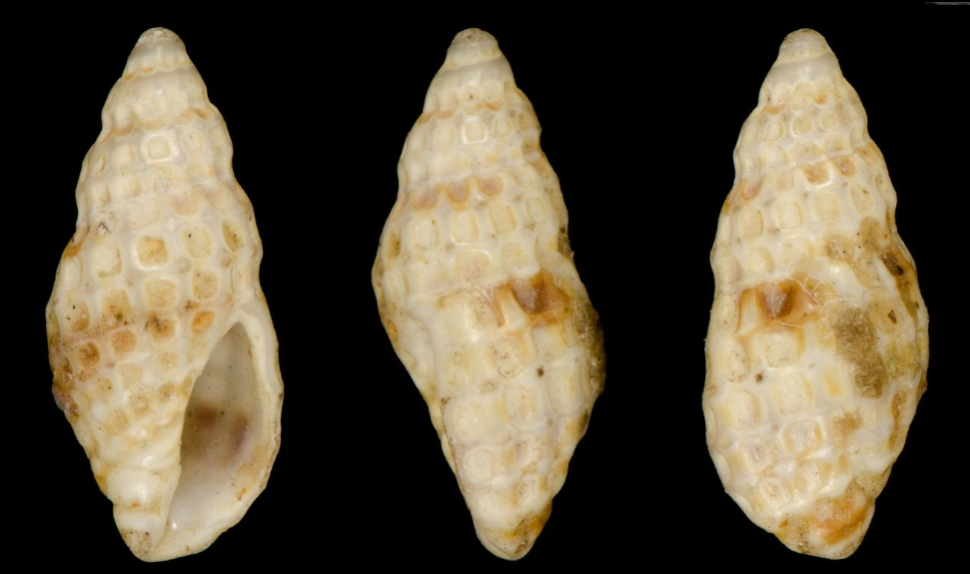
- Shell of Clathromangelia fuscoligata (lectotype at the Smithsonian Institution)

Scientific classification
- Kingdom: Animalia
- Phylum: Mollusca
- Class: Gastropoda
- Subclass: Caenogastropoda
- Order: Neogastropoda
- Superfamily: Conoidea
- Family: Raphitomidae
- Genus: Clathromangelia
- Species: C. fuscoligata

Binomial name
- Clathromangelia fuscoligata (Dall, 1871)

Synonyms
- Daphnella fuscoligata Dall, 1871; Mitromorpha (Mitromorpha) crassaspera Grant, U.S. & H.R. Gale, 1931

= Clathromangelia fuscoligata =

Species of gastropod

Clathromangelia fuscoligata is a species of sea snail, a marine gastropod mollusk in the family Raphitomidae.

== Description ==
The shell is strongly sculptured, longitudinally and spirally. The color of the shell is brownish white, brown-banded at the suture, and in the middle of the body whorl. The nodulous intersections of the sculpture are frequently brown-tipped.

== Distribution ==
This species occurs in the Pacific Ocean along California, USA
