= Burchia =

Scientific classification
- Kingdom: Animalia
- Phylum: Mollusca
- Class: Gastropoda
- Subclass: Caenogastropoda
- Order: Neogastropoda
- Superfamily: Conoidea
- Family: Pseudomelatomidae
- Genus: Burchia; Bartsch, 1944

Type species
- Pseudomelatoma redondoensis T. Burch, 1938

Species
- See text

Genus of gastropods

Burchia is a genus of sea snails, marine gastropod mollusks in the family Pseudomelatomidae.

== Species ==
Species within the genus Burchia include:

- Burchia clionella Dall, 1908
- Burchia semiinflata (Grant & Gale, 1931)
- Burchia spectabilis Sysoev & Taylor, 1997

Species brought into synonymy

- Burchia redondoensis (T. Burch, 1938): synonym of Burchia semiinflata (Grant & Gale, 1931)
