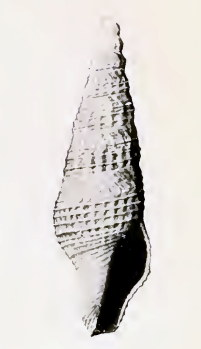
- Original image of a shell of Ophiodermella fancherae

Scientific classification
- Kingdom: Animalia
- Phylum: Mollusca
- Class: Gastropoda
- Subclass: Caenogastropoda
- Order: Neogastropoda
- Superfamily: Conoidea
- Family: Borsoniidae
- Genus: Ophiodermella
- Species: O. fancherae

Binomial name
- Ophiodermella fancherae (Dall, 1903)

Synonyms
- Clathodrillia (Moniolopsis) fancherae (Dall, 1921); Drillia fancherae W.H. Dall, 1903; Mangilia fancherae Dall, 1903; Moniolopsis fancherae (Dall, 1919)

= Ophiodermella fancherae =

Species of gastropod

Ophiodermella fancherae is a species of sea snail, a marine gastropod mollusk in the family Borsoniidae.

== Description ==
The length of the shell attains 17.7 mm, its diameter 3 mm.

(Original description) The shell is slender and elongate. It has a dark reddish-brown color when fresh. The smooth protoconch is somewhat swollen and contains about two whorls. The subsequent whorls number about six or seven. They are similarly sculptured: axial sculpture consists of numerous low slender flexuous riblets with wider interspaces, extending from the suture to the periphery and become obsolete on the base of the shell. These are crossed (between the sutures) by from four to six spiral subequal threads, of which those on the periphery are somewhat more prominent, and all are slightly nodulous where they override the ribleis. On the base there are about 15 of these threads with somewhat wider interspaces. The aperture is rather narrow. The outer lip is sharp and flexuous. The anal sulcus is wide and shallow, halfway between the suture and the periphery. The columellar lip is smooth. The siphonal canal is rather Iong, straight, and open.

== Distribution ==
This species occurs in the Pacific Ocean off California, USA to Lower California, Mexico.
