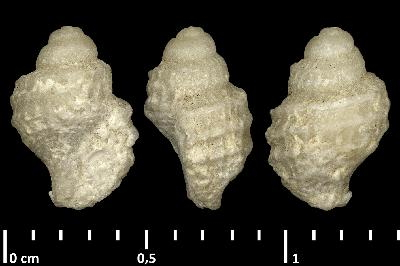
- Shell of Clathromangilia libyca (syntype at MNHN, Paris)

Scientific classification
- Kingdom: Animalia
- Phylum: Mollusca
- Class: Gastropoda
- Subclass: Caenogastropoda
- Order: Neogastropoda
- Superfamily: Conoidea
- Family: Raphitomidae
- Genus: Clathromangelia
- Species: C. libyca

Binomial name
- Clathromangelia libyca (Cuvillier, 1933)

Synonyms
- † Clathromangilia libyca Cuvillier, 1933 (original combination)

= Clathromangelia libyca =

Extinct species of gastropod

Clathromangelia libyca is an extinct species of sea snail, a marine gastropod mollusk in the family Raphitomidae.

== Distribution ==
Fossils of this extinct species were found in Eocene strata in Egypt.
