= Clathromangelia fenestrata =

Scientific classification
- Kingdom: Animalia
- Phylum: Mollusca
- Class: Gastropoda
- Subclass: Caenogastropoda
- Order: Neogastropoda
- Superfamily: Conoidea
- Family: Raphitomidae
- Genus: Clathromangelia
- Species: C. fenestrata

Binomial name
- Clathromangelia fenestrata (Millet, 1865)

Synonyms
- † Defrancia fenestrata Millet, 1865 (original combination)

Species of gastropod

Clathromangelia fenestrata is an extinct species of sea snail, a marine gastropod mollusk in the family Raphitomidae.

== Distribution ==
Fossils of this extinct species were found in Pliocene strata in northwest France.
