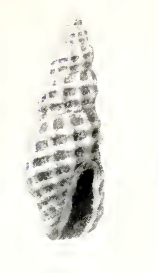
- Original image of a shell of Clathromangelia rhyssa

Scientific classification
- Kingdom: Animalia
- Phylum: Mollusca
- Class: Gastropoda
- Subclass: Caenogastropoda
- Order: Neogastropoda
- Superfamily: Conoidea
- Family: Raphitomidae
- Genus: Clathromangelia
- Species: C. rhyssa

Binomial name
- Clathromangelia rhyssa (Dall, 1919)

Synonyms
- Mangilia (Clathromangilia) rhyssa Dall, 1919

= Clathromangelia rhyssa =

Species of gastropod

Clathromangelia rhyssa is a species of sea snail, a marine gastropod mollusk in the family Raphitomidae.

== Description ==
The shell grows to a length of 7 mm, its diameter 2 mm. (Original description) The small, brownish shell is coarsely sculptured, with six whorls exclusive of the (lost) protoconch. The suture is appressed, somewhat constricted and obscure. The upper whorls show two prominent cords crossing the ribs without nodulation, the body whorl with six. The spiral sculpture is more prominent than the axial, which consists of (on the body whorl 10) straight axial ribs continuous to the base. There are traces of some fine spiral striation. The interstices of the reticulation are deep and squarish. The sutural fasciole is obscure. The sulcus is very shallow. The aperture is short with hardly any siphonal canal and no denticulations or lirations.

== Distribution ==
This species occurs in the Gulf of California, Western Mexico.
