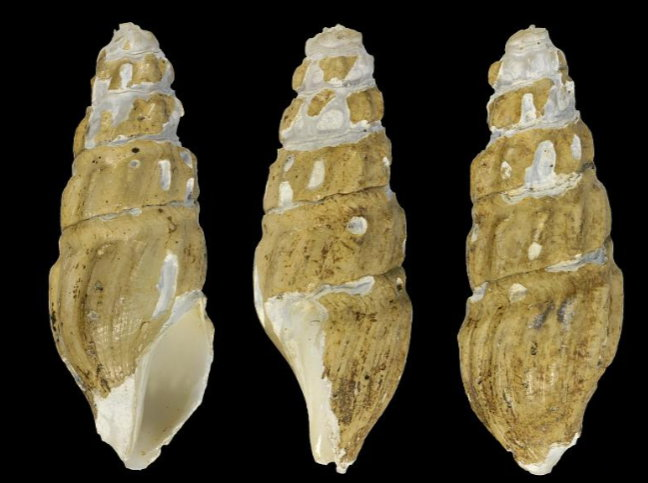
- Shell of Burchia clionella (holotype at the Smithsonian Institution)

Scientific classification
- Kingdom: Animalia
- Phylum: Mollusca
- Class: Gastropoda
- Subclass: Caenogastropoda
- Order: Neogastropoda
- Superfamily: Conoidea
- Family: Pseudomelatomidae
- Genus: Burchia
- Species: B. clionella

Binomial name
- Burchia clionella (Dall, 1908)

Synonyms
- Leucosyrinx clionella Dall, 1908 superseded combination; Crassispira (Burchia) clionella Dall, 1908

= Burchia clionella =

Species of gastropod

Burchia clionella is a species of sea snail, a marine gastropod mollusk in the family Pseudomelatomidae.

IN 1938 Paul Bartsch was of the opinion that Leucosyrinx clionella was actually as synonym of Burchia clionella, agreeing in radular characters with Y-shaped marginals only as well in the shell's appearance.

== Description ==
The length of the shell attains 37 mm, its diameter 12.5 mm.

(Original description) The large, solid shell is chalky, with a rather thick olivaceous periostracum, and about seven whorls. The apex is eroded. The spire is much longer than the aperture. It has a subfusiform shape, with whorls appressed at and constricted in front of the suture. The constriction corresponds to the anal fasciole behind which the margin of the whorl has the aspect of a thickened band. The axial sculpture, beside incremental lines, consists of twelve low, rounded, strong, slightly protractive ribs with subequal interspaces, strongest just in front of the fasciole, and, on the body whorl becoming obsolete on the base. The spiral sculpture consists of numerous obsolete rather close spiral threads, irregularly disposed, stronger and much more distant on the base, but always obscure. The aperture is narrowly lunate, the anal sulcus conspicuous but shallow. The outer lip is simple. The body shows a moderately thick, smooth callus extended onto the short, straight columella, which is obliquely attenuated in front, with a wide, short, shallow siphonal canal.

== Distribution ==
This marine species occurs from the Gulf of Panama to Peru.
