= Clathromangelia coffea =

Scientific classification
- Kingdom: Animalia
- Phylum: Mollusca
- Class: Gastropoda
- Subclass: Caenogastropoda
- Order: Neogastropoda
- Superfamily: Conoidea
- Family: Raphitomidae
- Genus: Clathromangelia
- Species: C. coffea

Binomial name
- Clathromangelia coffea Kuroda, Habe & Oyama, 1971

Species of gastropod

Clathromangelia coffea is a species of sea snail, a marine gastropod mollusk in the family Raphitomidae.

== Description ==
The shell grows to a length of 22 mm.

== Distribution ==
This species occurs in the Pacific Ocean off the Philippines and Japan.
