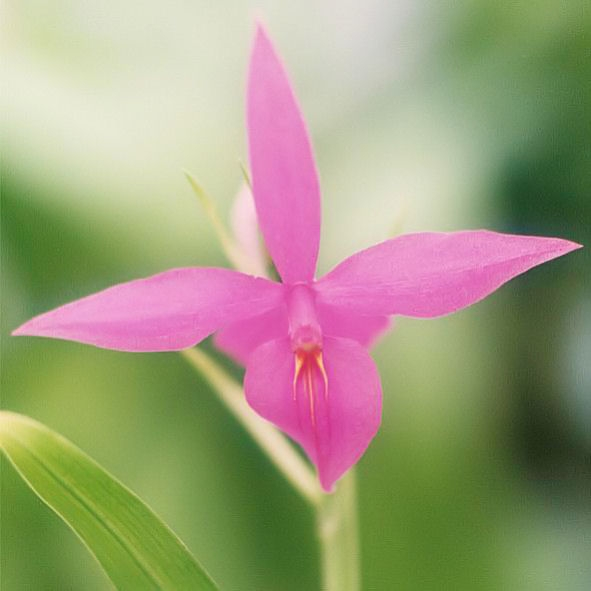

Scientific classification
- Kingdom: Plantae
- Clade: Tracheophytes
- Clade: Angiosperms
- Clade: Monocots
- Order: Asparagales
- Family: Orchidaceae
- Subfamily: Epidendroideae
- Genus: Barkeria
- Species: B. skinneri

Binomial name
- Barkeria skinneri (Bateman ex Lindl.) A. Rich. & Galeotti (1844)

Synonyms
- Epidendrum skinneri Bateman ex Lindl. (1836) (Basionym); Dothilophis purpurea Raf. (1838); Barkeria skinneri var. major Paxton (1849); Epidendrum fuchsii Regel (1851)

= Barkeria skinneri =

Species of orchid

Barkeria skinneri is a species of orchid native to Guatemala and Chiapas.
