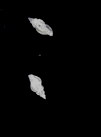
- Two shells of Clathromangelia strigilata (museum specimens at Naturalis Biodiversity Center)

Scientific classification
- Kingdom: Animalia
- Phylum: Mollusca
- Class: Gastropoda
- Subclass: Caenogastropoda
- Order: Neogastropoda
- Superfamily: Conoidea
- Family: Raphitomidae
- Genus: Clathromangelia
- Species: C. strigilata

Binomial name
- Clathromangelia strigilata (Pallary, 1904)

Synonyms
- Clathromangilia strigilata Pallary, 1904; Defrancia strigillata Pallary, 1904

= Clathromangelia strigilata =

Species of gastropod

Clathromangelia strigilata is a species of sea snail, a marine gastropod mollusk in the family Raphitomidae.

== Description ==
The white, slightly translucent fusiform shell has convex whorls with prominent, longitudinal costae about the whole length and sloping, equidistant striae. The shell grows to a length of 4 mm to 5 mm. The oblong aperture is somewhat rounded and its length is slightly less than the total length of the shell. The siphonal canal is wide open. The columella is slightly inclined to the left. The outer lip is not dentate and is inclined inwards with below a shallow anal sinus.

== Distribution ==
This species is found in the Mediterranean Sea in the Gulf of Gabès, Tunisia.
