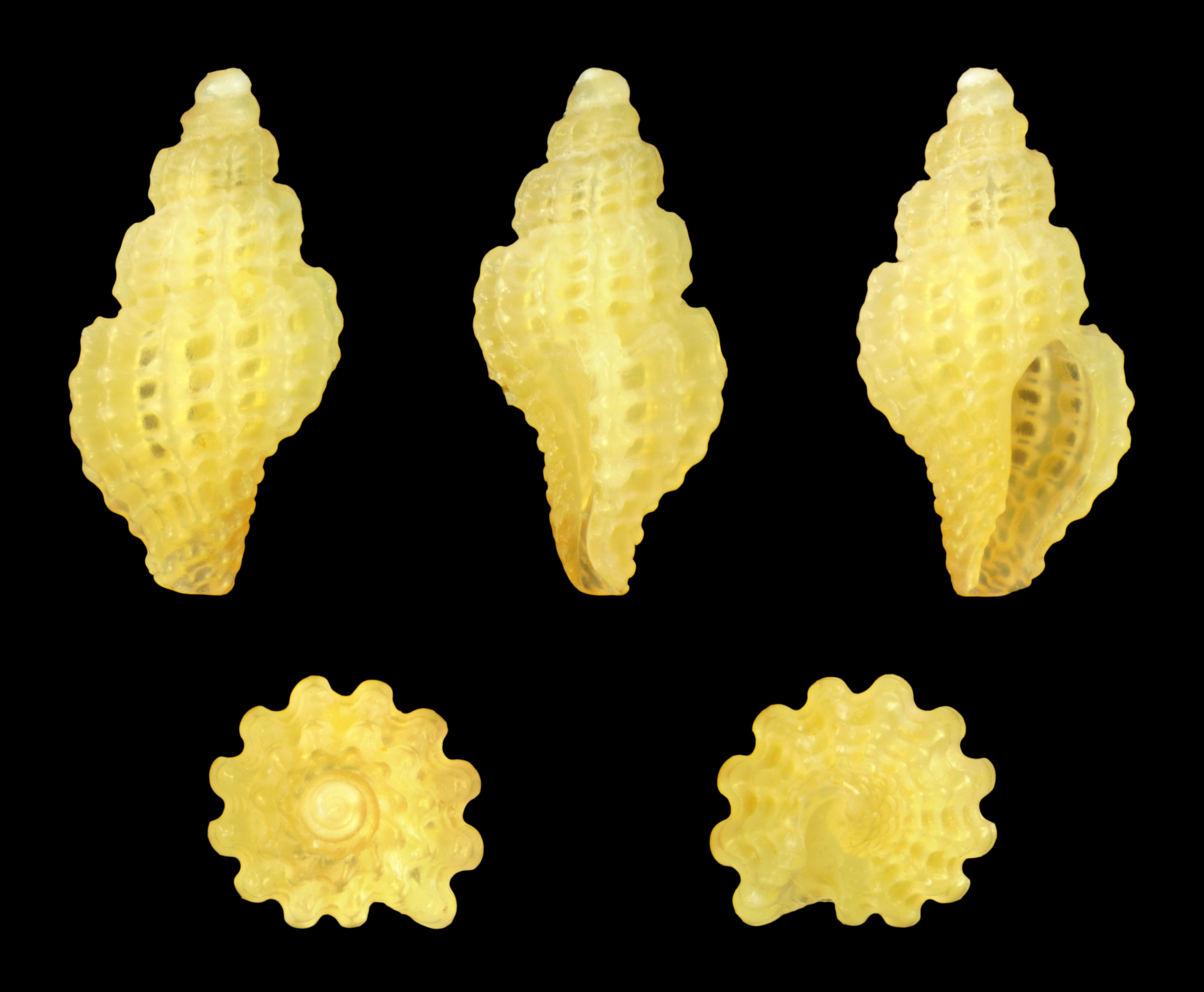
- Clathromangelia granum (Philippi, 1844)

Scientific classification
- Kingdom: Animalia
- Phylum: Mollusca
- Class: Gastropoda
- Subclass: Caenogastropoda
- Order: Neogastropoda
- Superfamily: Conoidea
- Family: Raphitomidae
- Genus: Clathromangelia; Monterosato, 1884

Type species
- Pleurotoma granum Philippi, 1844

Synonyms
- Clathromangilia

= Clathromangelia =

Genus of gastropods

Clathromangelia is a genus of sea snails, marine gastropod mollusks in the family Raphitomidae.

The species in this genus lack a radula.

== Species ==
Species within the genus Clathromangelia include:

- Clathromangelia coffea Kuroda, Habe & Oyama, 1971
- † Clathromangelia fenestrata (Millet, 1865)
- Clathromangelia fuscoligata (Dall, 1871)
- Clathromangelia granum (Philippi, 1844)
- † Clathromangelia libyca (Cuvillier, 1933)
- Clathromangelia loiselieri Oberling, 1970
- † Clathromangelia quadrillum (Dujardin, 1837)
- Clathromangelia rhyssa (Dall, 1919)
- Clathromangelia strigilata (Pallary, 1904)
- Clathromangelia variegata (Carpenter, 1864)

Species brought into synonymy

- Clathromangelia delosensis (Reeve, 1846): synonym of Clathromangelia granum (Philippi, 1844)
- Clathromangelia fehri van Aartsen & Zenetou, 1987: synonym of Clathromangelia loiselieri Oberling, 1970
- Clathromangelia pellucida (Reeve, 1846): synonym of Citharomangelia pellucida (Reeve, 1846)
