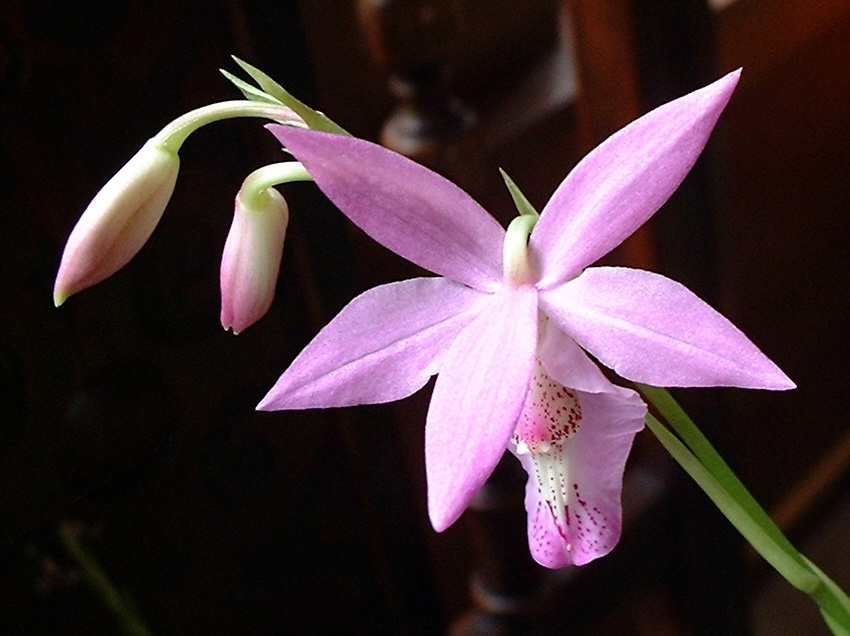

Scientific classification
- Kingdom: Plantae
- Clade: Tracheophytes
- Clade: Angiosperms
- Clade: Monocots
- Order: Asparagales
- Family: Orchidaceae
- Subfamily: Epidendroideae
- Genus: Barkeria
- Species: B. lindleyana

Binomial name
- Barkeria lindleyana Bateman ex Lindl. (1842)

Synonyms
- Epidendrum lindleyanum (Bateman ex Lindl.) Rchb.f. (1862); Epidendrum lindleyanum var. centerae H.J. Veitch, Man. (1890)

= Barkeria lindleyana =

Species of orchid

Barkeria lindleyana is a species of orchid.
