= Clathromangelia variegata =

Scientific classification
- Kingdom: Animalia
- Phylum: Mollusca
- Class: Gastropoda
- Subclass: Caenogastropoda
- Order: Neogastropoda
- Superfamily: Conoidea
- Family: Raphitomidae
- Genus: Clathromangelia
- Species: C. variegata

Binomial name
- Clathromangelia variegata (Carpenter, 1864)

Synonyms
- Daphnella variegata Carpenter, 1864; Mangelia variegata Carpenter, 1864

Species of gastropod

Clathromangelia variegata is a species of sea snail, a marine gastropod mollusk in the family Raphitomidae.

== Description ==
The shell is very thin, with nine ribs and almost microscopic revolving lines. The color of the shell is yellowish or pinkish horn-color, with one or two narrow chestnut bands sometimes interrupted. The shell grows to a length of 8 mm.

== Distribution ==
This species occurs in the Pacific Ocean off California, USA
