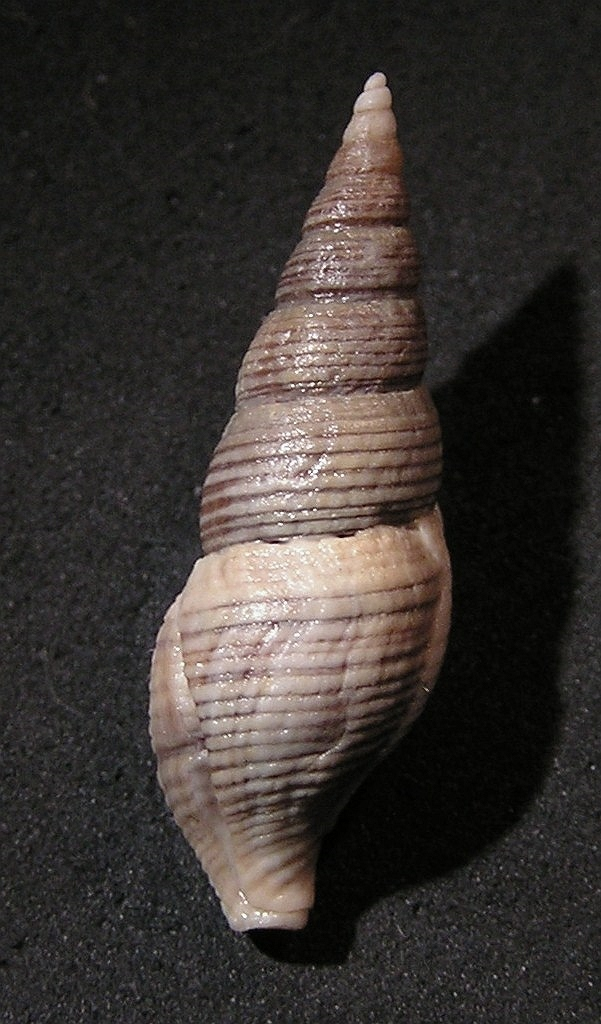
- Abapertural view of a shell of Ophiodermella inermis

Scientific classification
- Kingdom: Animalia
- Phylum: Mollusca
- Class: Gastropoda
- Subclass: Caenogastropoda
- Order: Neogastropoda
- Superfamily: Conoidea
- Family: Borsoniidae
- Genus: Ophiodermella; Bartsch, 1944

Type species
- Pleurotoma ophioderma Dall, 1908

= Ophiodermella =

Genus of gastropods

Ophiodermella is a genus of sea snails, marine gastropod mollusks in the family Borsoniidae.

== Species ==
Species within the genus Ophiodermella include:

- Ophiodermella akkeshiensis (Habe, 1958)
- Ophiodermella cancellata (Carpenter, 1864)
- Ophiodermella fancherae (Dall, 1903)
- Ophiodermella grippi (Dall, 1919)
- Ophiodermella inermis (Reeve, 1843)
- Ophiodermella miyatensis (Yokoyama, 1920)
- Ophiodermella ogurana (Yokoyama, 1922)

Species brought into synonymy

- † Ophiodermella bella Ozaki, 1958: synonym of Retimohnia bella (Ozaki, 1958) (original combination)
- Ophiodermella incisa (Carpenter, 1864): synonym of Ophiodermella inermis (Reeve, 1843)
- Ophiodermella montereyensis Bartsch, 1944: synonym of Ophiodermella inermis (Reeve, 1843)
