= Clathromangelia loiselieri =

Scientific classification
- Kingdom: Animalia
- Phylum: Mollusca
- Class: Gastropoda
- Subclass: Caenogastropoda
- Order: Neogastropoda
- Superfamily: Conoidea
- Family: Raphitomidae
- Genus: Clathromangelia
- Species: C. loiselieri

Binomial name
- Clathromangelia loiselieri Oberling, 1970

Synonyms
- Clathromangelia fehri van Aartsen & Zenetou, 1987

Species of gastropod

Clathromangelia loiselieri is a species of sea snail, a marine gastropod mollusk in the family Raphitomidae.

== Description ==
The shell grows to a length of 5 mm. This species lacks a radula.

== Distribution ==
This species occurs in the Eastern Mediterranean Sea off Greece and in the European waters of the North Atlantic Ocean.
