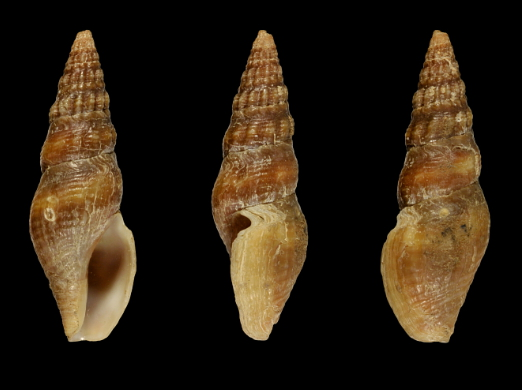
- Shell of Ophiodermella grippi (holotype at the Smithsonian Institution)

Scientific classification
- Kingdom: Animalia
- Phylum: Mollusca
- Class: Gastropoda
- Subclass: Caenogastropoda
- Order: Neogastropoda
- Superfamily: Conoidea
- Family: Borsoniidae
- Genus: Ophiodermella
- Species: O. grippi

Binomial name
- Ophiodermella grippi (Dall, 1919)

Synonyms
- Crassispira martinensis Dall, W.H., 1919; Moniliopsis grippi Dall, 1919 (original combination); Pseudomelatoma grippi (Dall, 1919)

= Ophiodermella grippi =

Species of gastropod

Ophiodermella grippi is a species of sea snail, a marine gastropod mollusk in the family Borsoniidae.

== Description ==
The size of an adult shell varies between 18 mm and 30 mm

(Original description) The slender shell slender contains about eight (slightly decollate) whorls. Its color is livid olivaceous with a pale peripheral band, lighter near the aperture. The suture is appressed, on the upper whorls rudely nodulous. The spiral sculpture in front of the fasciole on the spire consists of five or six strong cords with narrower interspaces, overriding the ribs. The cords cover the body whorl. They are feebler on the periphery, coarser on the base There are also faint spiral striae here and there. The axial sculpture on the upper part of the spire shows 14 or 15 strong rounded ribs with wider interspaces, feebler on the penultimate whorl, becoming obsolete on the body whorl. The aperture is ovate. The anal sulcus is conspicuous and shallow. The outer lip is thin and simple. The inner lip is smooth. The siphonal canal is short, wide and not recurved.

== Distribution ==
This species occurs in the Pacific Ocean off California, United States and the Gulf of California, Mexico.
