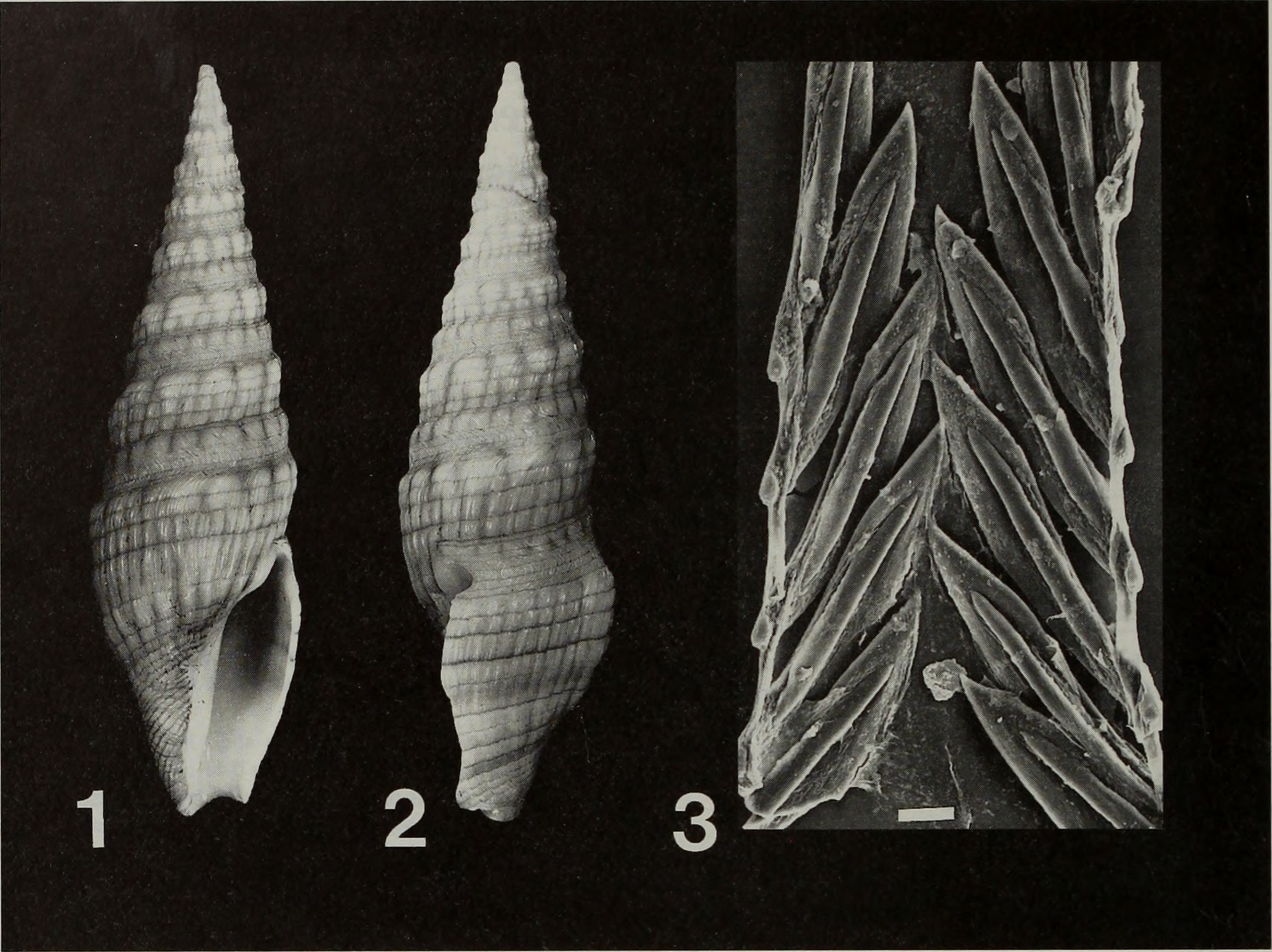
- 1. shell height 36.9 mm. 2. lateral view 3.radula teeth - scale bar 20μm. (From Sysoev & Taylor)

Scientific classification
- Kingdom: Animalia
- Phylum: Mollusca
- Class: Gastropoda
- Subclass: Caenogastropoda
- Order: Neogastropoda
- Superfamily: Conoidea
- Family: Pseudomelatomidae
- Genus: Burchia
- Species: B. spectabilis

Binomial name
- Burchia spectabilis Sysoev & Taylor, 1997

= Burchia spectabilis =

Species of gastropod

Holotype site'"`UNIQ--ref-00000009-QINU`"'

Burchia spectabilis is a species of sea snail, a marine gastropod mollusk in the family Pseudomelatomidae, first described by Alexander Sysoev and JohnTaylor in 1997.

This marine species occurs off Western Australia, Australia
