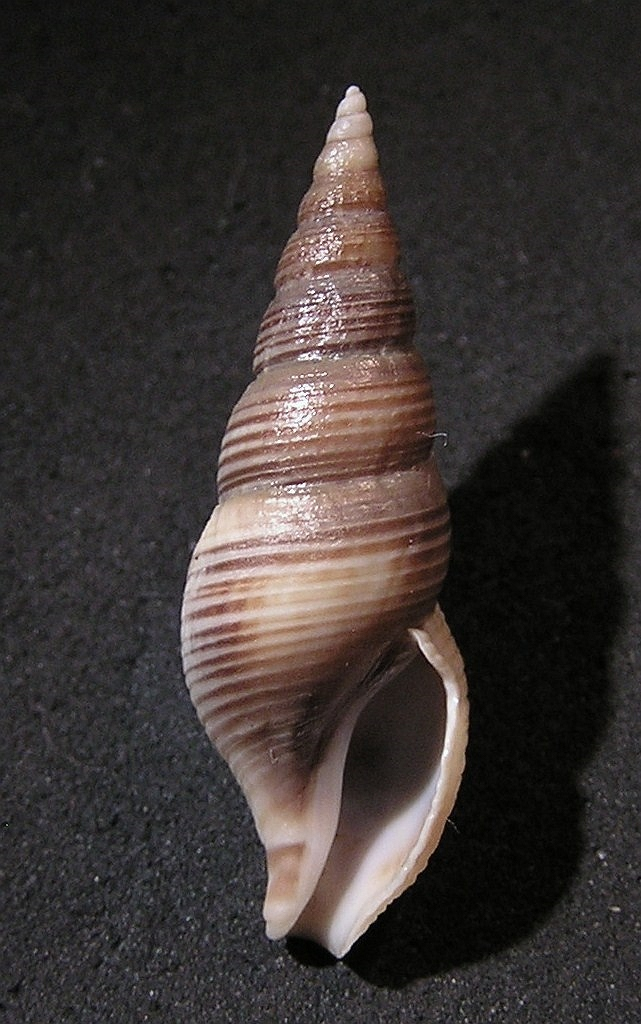
- Apertural view of a shell of Ophiodermella inermis

Scientific classification
- Kingdom: Animalia
- Phylum: Mollusca
- Class: Gastropoda
- Subclass: Caenogastropoda
- Order: Neogastropoda
- Superfamily: Conoidea
- Family: Borsoniidae
- Genus: Ophiodermella
- Species: O. inermis

Binomial name
- Ophiodermella inermis (Reeve, 1843)

Synonyms
- Drillia incisa Carpenter, P.P., 1864; Ophiodermella ophioderma Dall, W.H., 1908; Ophiodermella montereyensis Bartsch, P., 1944; Pleurotoma inermis Reeve, 1843; Pleurotoma ophioderma Dall, 1908 (unnecessary nom. nov. pro Pleurotoma inermis Reeve, 1843); Turris (Surcula) halcyonis Dall, 1908; Turris halcyonis Dall, 1908

= Ophiodermella inermis =

Species of gastropod

Ophiodermella inermis is a species of sea snail, a marine gastropod mollusk in the family Borsoniidae.

== Description ==
The shell grows to a length of 40 mm, its width 7 mm.

The shell is pinkish ash-colored under a light olivaceous epidermis. The lines of growth are sometimes rib-like, oblique and angulated at the periphery and lighter-colored, so that the interspaces appear like angulated lines of chestnut or reddish narrow stripes. The whole surface is covered by close revolving incised lines.

The small shell is slender and very acute. Its color is of a livid purple. The shell is covered with an olivaceous periostracum, with about eleven whorls. The protoconch is more or less eroded, but apparently smooth, acute, and including about two and a half whorls. The subsequent whorls are rather flat, compressed and appressed at and in front of the suture, with a rounded base and inconspicuous anal fasciole. The sculpture consists chiefly of flattish spiral threads, one at the suture, three smaller ones in front of it, followed by a flat broader one representing the fasciole, then (on the body whorl eight) more prominent threads, undulate or segmented by incremental lines and with wider interspaces (sometimes containing an intercalary smaller thread) to the base, followed by six or seven unsegmented threads to the siphonal fasciole, which bears six or seven smaller threads. The succession of undulations or slightly swollen segments gives a slightly cancellate effect to the part of the whorl which bears them, but there are no axial ribs, the effect being produced rather by depressions between the rather coarse incremental lines. The aperture is narrow and acute behind. The anal sulcus is narrow and distinct but not very deep. The outer lip in front of it is arcuately produced. The siphonal canal is contracted, short, and recurved. Theis inner lip polished and superficially erased. The columella is twisted, with a thin layer of callus. An operculum is present.

== Distribution ==
This species occurs in the Pacific Ocean from Alaska to California.
