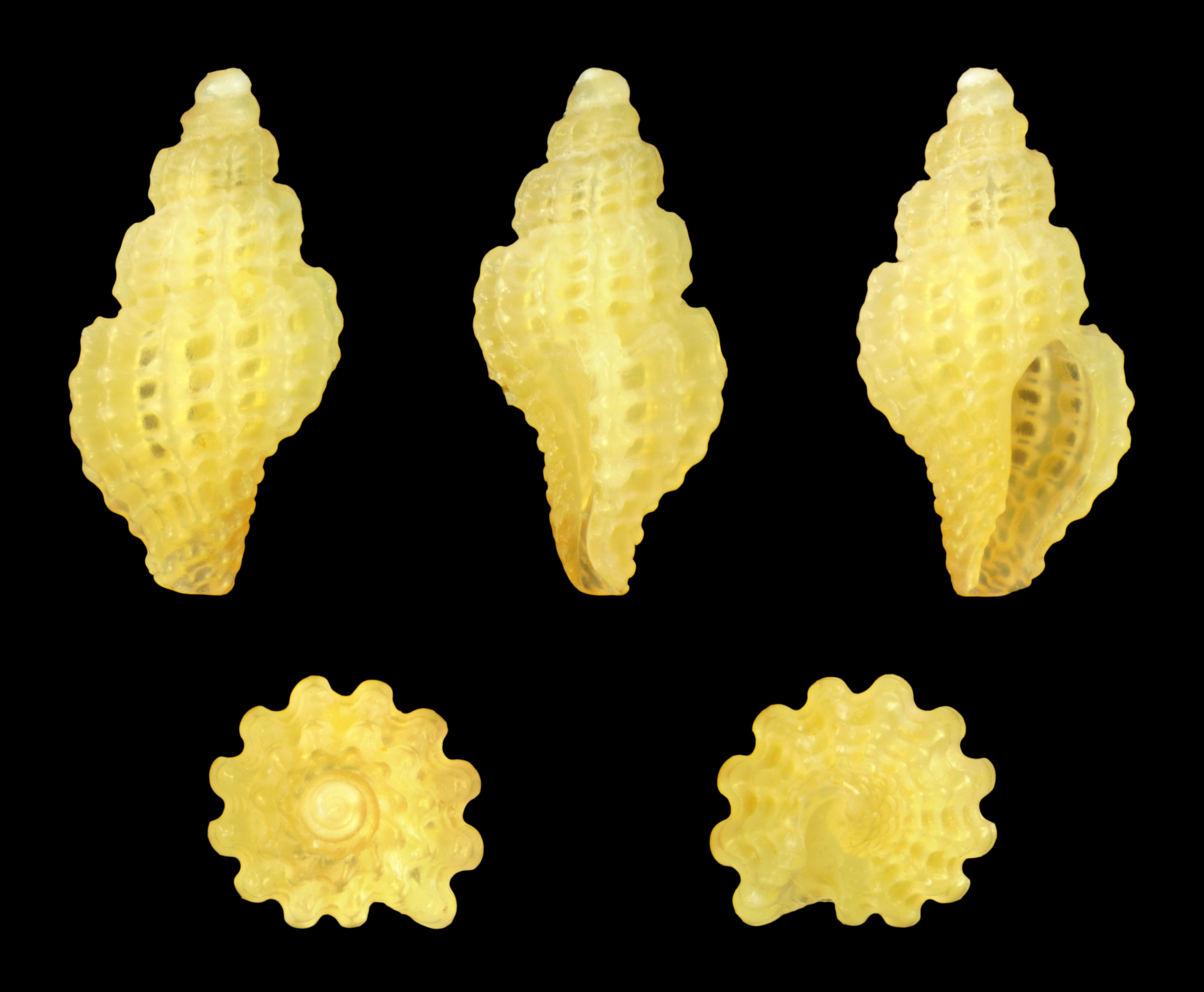
- A shell of Clathromangelia granum

Scientific classification
- Kingdom: Animalia
- Phylum: Mollusca
- Class: Gastropoda
- Subclass: Caenogastropoda
- Order: Neogastropoda
- Superfamily: Conoidea
- Family: Raphitomidae
- Genus: Clathromangelia
- Species: C. granum

Binomial name
- Clathromangelia granum (Philippi, 1844)

Synonyms
- Clathromangelia delosensis (Reeve, 1846); Clathurella clathrata Marcel de Serres; Pleurotoma cancellata Calcara, 1839; Pleurotoma delosensis Reeve, 1846; Pleurotoma granum Philippi, 1844 (basionym); Pleurotoma rude Philippi, 1836

= Clathromangelia granum =

Species of gastropod

Clathromangelia granum is a species of sea snail, a marine gastropod mollusk in the family Raphitomidae.

== Description ==
The shell grows to a length of 7 mm. The shell is conspicuously latticed with coarse sculpture. The aperture is large and truncate at the yellowish white base. They reproduce sexually.

== Distribution ==
This species occurs in European waters and in the Mediterranean Sea off Italy and Morocco.
