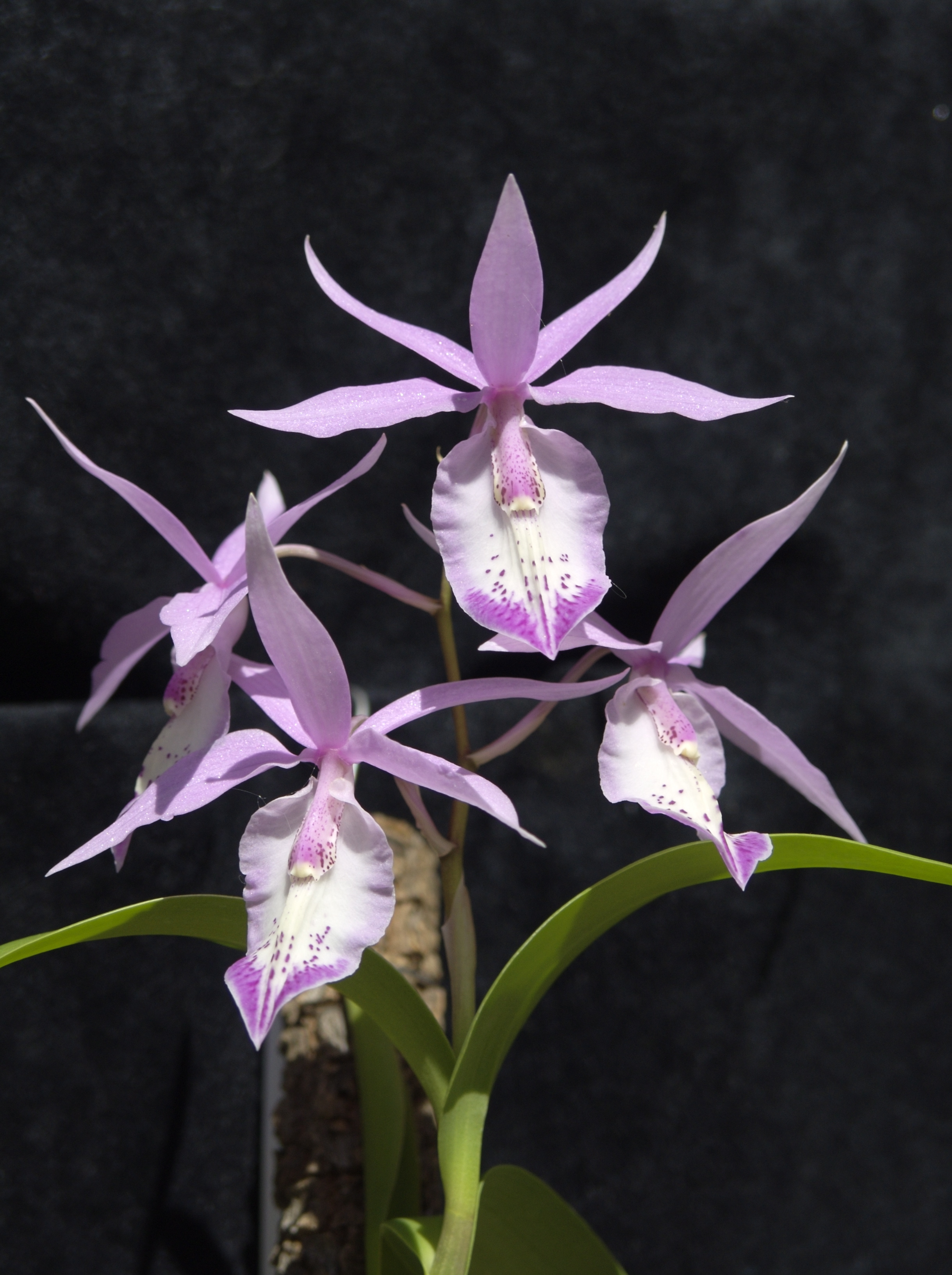

Scientific classification
- Kingdom: Plantae
- Clade: Tracheophytes
- Clade: Angiosperms
- Clade: Monocots
- Order: Asparagales
- Family: Orchidaceae
- Subfamily: Epidendroideae
- Genus: Barkeria
- Species: B. spectabilis

Binomial name
- Barkeria spectabilis Bateman ex Lindl. (1842)

Synonyms
- Epidendrum spectabile (Bateman ex Lindl.) Rchb.f. in W.G.Walpers; Barkeria lindleyana subsp. spectabilis (Bateman ex Lindl.) Thien

= Barkeria spectabilis =

Species of orchid

Barkeria spectabilis is a species of orchid. It is native to El Salvador, Chiapas, Guatemala, Honduras, and Nicaragua.

Barkeria spectabilis is an epiphyte growing on Quercus trees at elevations of around 4,900 feet (1,500 m). It is closely related to Epidendrum. Flowers are white to pink with darker speckles, blooming from April to August.
