= Burchia semiinflata =

Scientific classification
- Kingdom: Animalia
- Phylum: Mollusca
- Class: Gastropoda
- Subclass: Caenogastropoda
- Order: Neogastropoda
- Superfamily: Conoidea
- Family: Pseudomelatomidae
- Genus: Burchia
- Species: B. semiinflata

Binomial name
- Burchia semiinflata (Grant & Gale, 1931)

Synonyms
- Burchia redondoensis (T. Burch, 1938); Crassispira (Burchia) semiinflata (Grant & Gale, 1931); Crassispira semiinflata (Grant & Gale, 1931); Crassispira semiinflata redondoensis (T.A. Burch, 1938); † Pseudomelatoma penicillata var. semiinflata Grant & Gale, 1931 (basionym); Pseudomelatoma redondoensis T. Burch, 1938; Pseudomelatoma semiinflata (U. S. Grant & Gale, 1931) superseded combination; Pseudomelatoma semiinflata redondoensis (T.A. Burch, 1938)

Species of gastropod

Burchia semiinflata is a species of sea snail, a marine gastropod mollusk in the family Pseudomelatomidae.

== Description ==
The length of the shell attains 45 mm.

== Distribution ==
This species occurs in the Pacific Ocean off Redondo Beach, California, United States.
