= Philip Pearsall Carpenter =

English minister and mollusc specialist

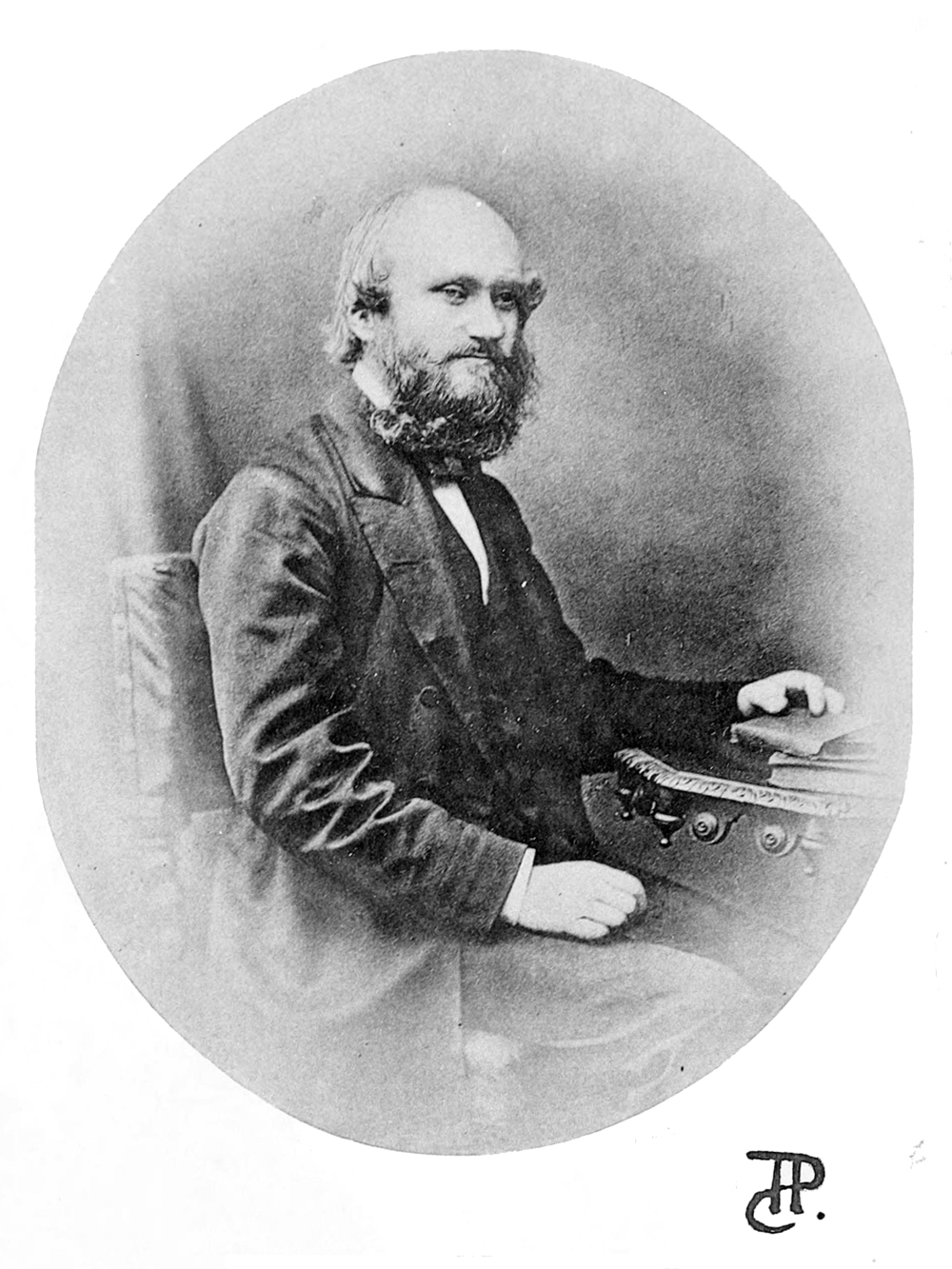
- Born: 11 April 1819; Bristol, Somerset, England, United Kingdom
- Died: 24 May 1877 (aged 58); Ste-Antoine Ward, Montreal, Quebec, Canada
- Years active: 1841–1877
- Known for: Minister, malacologist, conchologist
- Spouse: Minnie Meyer
- Parent(s): Lant Carpenter, Anna Penn
- Relatives: William Benjamin Carpenter (brother); Mary Carpenter (sister); Russell Lant Carpenter (brother)

Philip Pearsall Carpenter (4 November 1819 – 24 May 1877) was an English minister who emigrated to Canada, where his field work as a malacologist or conchologist is still well regarded today. A man of many talents, he wrote, published, taught, and was a volunteer explaining the growing study of shells in North America.

== Life ==
Philip P. Carpenter was born in Bristol, England on 4 November 1819. His father was Lant Carpenter, a notable educator and Unitarian minister. His mother was Anna or Hannah Penn, daughter of John Penn and Mary. Anna was christened on 11 May 1787 in Bromsgrove, Worcester.

P. P. Carpenter, as he was called, was educated at Trinity Bristol College, and then Manchester College (then at York, now at Oxford), gaining a BA from the University of London in 1841, the year of his ordination as a minister. Carpenter was a vegetarian and joined the Vegetarian Society in 1851.

Carpenter was a Presbyterian minister in Warrington between 1846 and 1862 and he studied the collection of shells in the local museum between 1860 and 1865, before moving to Canada. He earned a Doctorate of Philosophy in 1860. He married Minnie Meyer in 1860. Minnie was born about 1830 in Hamburg, Germany. Her parents are unknown.

Carpenter died 24 May 1877 in the Saint Antoine Ward of Montreal, Quebec, Canada, of typhoid complicated by rheumatism. His widow was still living in their house in 1881.

The town of his birth erected a memorial drinking fountain to him, in Bank Gardens by the town hall.

== Notable siblings ==
Mary Carpenter was born on 3 April 1807 in Kidderminster, Worcester. She was a social reformer. who founded of the Ragged school movement. She died on 14 June 1877 and was buried in Arnos Vale, Bristol, England. She is mentioned in brother William's insert in the Dictionary of Scientific Biography by Charles Coulton Gillispie.

William Benjamin Carpenter was born on 29 October 1813 in Exeter, Devon, England. He became a zoologist and worked as his brother did on invertebrates. He died on 19 November 1885 in London and was buried in Highgate Cemetery, London.

== Partial bibliography ==
- Gould, A.A., and P.P. Carpenter. 1856. Descriptions of shells from the Gulf of California and the Pacific coasts of Mexico and California. Part II. Proceedings of the Zoological Society of London 1856(24): 198–208.
- Carpenter, P.P. 1856. Monograph of the shells collected by T. Nuttall, Esq., on the California coast, in the years 1834–5. Proceedings of the Zoological Society of London 1856(24):209–229.
- Carpenter, P.P. 1857. Report on the present state of our knowledge with regard to the Mollusca of the west coast of North America. Report of the British Association for the Advancement of Science 1856: 159–368 + 4 plates.
- Carpenter, P.P. 1857. Catalogue of the collection of Mazatlan shells, in the British Museum: collected by Frederick Reigen. London. 552 pp.
- Carpenter, P.P. 1857. Catalogue of the collection of Mazatlan shells, in the British Museum: collected by Frederick Reigen. 2nd ed. Oberlin Press, Warrington i–viii + i–xii + 552 pp.
- Carpenter, P.P. [1857] 1967. [reprint of] Catalogue of the collection of Mazatlan shells, in the British Museum: collected by Frederick Reigen. [British Museum, London] Paleontological Research Institute, Ithaca, NY i–iv + ix–xvi + 552 pp.
- Carpenter, P.P. 1860. Lectures on molluscs. Smithsonian Report 1860:117.Carpenter, P.P. 1872. The molluscs of Western North America, 1872. Smithsonian Miscellaneous Collections 12: 1–446.

== See also ==
- Category:Taxa named by Philip Pearsall Carpenter
