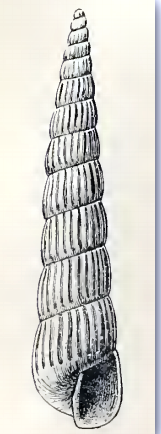
- Drawing of a shell of Turbonilla carpenteri

Scientific classification
- Kingdom: Animalia
- Phylum: Mollusca
- Class: Gastropoda
- Family: Pyramidellidae
- Genus: Turbonilla
- Species: T. carpenteri

Binomial name
- Turbonilla carpenteri Dall & Bartsch, 1909

Synonyms
- Turbonilla (Strioturbonilla) carpenteri Dall & Bartsch, 1909

= Turbonilla carpenteri =

Species of gastropod

Turbonilla carpenteri is a species of sea snail, a marine gastropod mollusk in the family Pyramidellidae, the pyrams and their allies.

== Description ==
The bluish-white shell is long and slender. Its length measures 7.9 mm. The 2½ helicoid whorls of the protoconch are small, depressed. Their axis is at right angles to that of the succeeding turns, in the first of which they are about one-fifth immersed. The 12 evenly rounded whorls of the teleoconch are situated exceedingly high between the sutures. They are marked by almost vertical axial ribs, which become slightly expanded and flattened at the summits. There are 18 of these ribs upon the first to third, 20 upon the fourth to sixth, 22 upon the seventh, 24 upon the eighth and ninth, and 26 upon the tenth. Upon the penultimate turn they become decidedly irregular and enfeebled. The intercostal spaces are about one-half as wide as the ribs, but a little depressed below the general surface of the shell. The sutures are somewhat constricted. The periphery of the body whorl is well rounded. The base of the shell is short and somewhat inflated. It is marked by feeble extensions of the axial ribs. The entire surface of spire and the base is crossed by numerous fine, wavy, spiral striations. The aperture subquadrate, and rather elongated. The posterior angle is obtuse. The outer lip is thin. The columella is rather long, slender, and slightly sinuous.

== Distribution ==
The type specimen was found in the Pacific Ocean off San Pedro, California.
