= Element =

Element or elements may refer to:

== Science ==
- Chemical element, a pure substance of one type of atom
- Heating element, a device that generates heat by electrical resistance
- Orbital elements, parameters required to identify a specific orbit of one body around another
- DNA element, a functional region of DNA, including genes and cis-regulatory elements.

== Mathematics ==
- Element (category theory), one of the constituents in general category theory
- Element (mathematics), one of the constituents of set theory in mathematics
- Differential element, an infinitesimally small change of a quantity in an integral
- Euclid's Elements, a mathematical treatise on geometry and number theory
- An entry, or element, of a matrix

== Philosophy and religion ==
- Classical elements, ancient beliefs about the fundamental types of matter (earth, air, fire, water)
- The elements, a religious term referring to the bread and wine of the Eucharist
- Godai (Japanese philosophy), the basis of the universe according to Japanese philosophy
- Mahābhūta, the four great elements in Buddhism, five in Hinduism
- Tattva, an elemental basis of the universe according to Hindu Samkhya philosophy
- Dravya, the six eternal substances of which the universe is composed, in Jain Philosophy
- Wuxing (Chinese philosophy), sometimes translated as five elements, the basis of the universe according to Chinese Taoin

== Technology ==
- Element (UML), part of the Unified Modeling Language superstructure
- Data element, a unit of data
- Electrical element, an abstract part of a circuit
- HTML element, a standard part of an HTML document
- Markup element, a part of a document defined by a markup language
- Structural element, in construction and engineering
- Adobe Photoshop Elements, a bitmap graphics program
- Adobe Premiere Elements, a video editing computer program
- Element (software), a Matrix-based chat application formerly known as Riot
- Elements (toolchain), a software development toolchain

== Business ==
- Element by Westin, a brand of Marriott International
- Element Electronics, an American electronics company
- Element Skateboards, a skateboard manufacturer
- Elements (restaurant), a restaurant in Princeton, New Jersey
- Elements, Hong Kong, a shopping mall in Hong Kong

== Entertainment ==
=== Music ===
- Element (production team), a Norwegian production and songwriting team
- Elements (band), a 1980s–1990s American jazz band

==== Albums ====
- Elements (Atheist album) or the title song, 1993
- Elements (B.o.B album), 2016
- Elements (Ludovico Einaudi album) or the title song, 2015
- Elements (Roger Glover album), 1978
- Elements (Steve Howe album), 2003
- Elements 1989–1990, by Carl Craig, 1996
- Elements Box by Mike Oldfield, four CD edition, 1993
- Elements – The Best of Mike Oldfield, single CD edition, 1993
- Elements – The Best of Mike Oldfield (video), 1993
- Elements, by Yoso, 2010
- Elements, by Caliban, 2018
- Elements, by Sister Hazel, 2020
- Elements (Elaine EP), 2019
- Elements (Ave Mujica EP), 2024
- Elements, an EP by Vicetone, 2019
- The Elements (Joe Henderson album), 1974
- The Elements (Second Person album), 2007
- The Elements (TobyMac album) or the title song, 2018

==== Songs ====
- "Element" (song), by Kendrick Lamar, 2017
- Elements, by A Band of Boys, 2002
- "Element", by Deerhunter from Why Hasn't Everything Already Disappeared?, 2019
- "Element", by Pop Smoke from Meet the Woo 2, 2020
- "Element", by Vision of Disorder from Vision of Disorder, 1996
- "Elements", by Matt Corby from Rainbow Valley, 2018
- "Elements", by Stratovarius from Elements Pt. 1, 2003
- "The Elements" (song), by Tom Lehrer, 1959
- "The Elements" (The Beach Boys song), 1966

=== Other entertainment ===
- Elements (miniseries), a Cartoon Network miniseries
- Elements trilogy, three films written and directed by Deepa Mehta
- Elements (esports), a team in the European League of Legends Championship Series
- Element (sports), the terminology of a distinct component of a performance

== Other uses ==
- Custom Denning Element, an Australian bus
- Element (criminal law), a basic set of common law principles regarding criminal liability
- Elements (journal), a scientific publication about mineralogy, geochemistry, and petrology
- Element Magazine, Asian men's magazine
- Éléments, French political magazine
- Elementy, Russian political magazine (1992–2000)
- The elements, a term used to refer to natural perils such as erosion, rough terrain, rust, cold, heat, and disastrous weather
- Honda Element, a car

== See also ==
- and
- and
- Elemental (disambiguation)
- Elementary (disambiguation)
- Five elements (disambiguation)
- Fifth Element (disambiguation)
