= Toxic ocean dumps off Southern California =

Chemical waste in the Pacific Ocean

During the 20th century, a large amount of chemical waste was dumped into the Pacific Ocean within the Southern California Bight off the West Coast of the United States. Dumped materials include DDT, WW II munitions, radioactive waste, PCBs, petroleum products, and sulfuric acid.

The chemical waste was dumped in at least 14 offshore locations, ranging from the Channel Islands in the north, to the shores off Ensenada, Mexico, in the south.

The Environmental Protection Agency has designated one of the offshore sites as a subunit of the Montrose Chemical Superfund site. After studying the offshore site, the EPA is planning is to leave the waste in place, and cover it with a layer of sediment.

== History ==
=== Dumping in the mid-20th century ===
From the 1930s until the early 1970s, multiple government agencies (including the California Regional Water Quality Control Board and the U.S. Army Corps of Engineers) approved ocean disposal of domestic, industrial, and military waste at 14 deep-water sites off the coast of Southern California. Waste disposed included refinery wastes, filter cakes and oil drilling wastes, chemical wastes, refuse and garbage, military explosives and radioactive wastes.

From 1946 to 1970, over 56,000 barrels of radioactive waste were dumped into the eastern Pacific Ocean, according to a 1999 report by the International Atomic Energy Agency. The barrels were dumped at sites ranging from Alaska to Southern California.

Montrose Chemical Corporation manufactured DDT during the years 1947 to 1983 at its plant near Torrance, California. The plant discharged wastewater containing the now-banned pesticide into Los Angeles sewers that emptied into the Pacific Ocean off White Point on the Palos Verdes Shelf. The manufacturing process resulted in groundwater and surface soil contamination on and near the Montrose plant property. Estimates of discharged DDT range from 800 to 1000 tons, between the late 1950s and the early 1970s.

Montrose, in addition to dumping DDT, also dumped sulfuric acid, which was a byproduct of the DDT manufacturing process. The acid was transported to the dump sites on barges operated by California Salvage Company. The Montrose Corporation site, consisting of 13 acres (5.3 ha), is now an EPA Superfund site.

Other industries also discharged PCBs into the Los Angeles sewer system that ended up on the Palos Verdes Shelf. The Palos Verdes Shelf is located off the coast of Palos Verdes (between Point Fermin and Point Vicente) and covers 43 square kilometers (17 square miles).

Not all DDT waste was in the form of barrels. California Salvage, a company that provided waste disposal services during the 1960s, transported DDT on barges to "dumping site 2" (about halfway between Palos Verdes and Santa Catalina island) and dumped it directly into the ocean, as a liquid. Analysis by the EPA suggests that most of the DDT measured in the Southern California waters is from the barge disposal, rather than the barrels.

Military munitions, including Hedgehogs, Mark 9 depth charges, anti-submarine weapons and smoke devices, were found on the ocean floor. These WW II munitions were commonly disposed of in the ocean before the 1970s.

The EPA concluded that over 3 million tons of petroleum products were dumped in the Southern California waste sites, including refinery wastes, filter cakes and oil drilling wastes.

=== Research and remediation ===
In 1973, the Southern California Coastal Water Research Project (SCCWRP) published a report that identified 14 waste dump sites in the Southern California Bight.

Starting in 1975, contaminated waste disposal in the San Pedro Channel was prohibited. Thereafter, uncontaminated dredge materials continued to be disposed of at approved EPA sites in the San Pedro Channel.

Since 1985, fish consumption advisories and health warnings have been posted in Southern California because of elevated DDT and PCB levels. Bottom-feeding fish are particularly at risk for high contamination levels. Consumption of white croaker, which has the highest contamination levels, should be avoided. Other bottom-feeding fish, including kelp bass, rockfish, and sculpin, are also highly contaminated. As a part of the Superfund project, the EPA is looking to reinforce the commercial and recreational fishing ban on white croaker.

In October 1989, the former Montrose Chemical facility in Torrance was added to the EPA's Superfund National Priorities List. The offshore Palos Verdes Shelf dumping site is an "Operable Unit" of that Montrose Chemical Superfund Site.

In 1990, the United States and California filed lawsuits against several companies that had industrial facilities near the Palos Verdes peninsula, citing damages to the nearby marine environment. The defendants included Montrose Chemical, Imperial Chemical Industries, Rhône-Poulenc, and Westinghouse Electric Corporation. In December 2000, Montrose Chemical and three other corporations settled their lawsuits for a total between $73 and $77 million. When combined with prior lawsuits, this brought the total up to $140 million to fund the restoration of the Palos Verdes Shelf marine environment.

Until as recently as 2007, bald eagles on Santa Catalina Island were unable to reproduce because the DDT caused their eggshells to become too thin and to break open before the eagle was fully developed. California sea lions have high levels of DDT and a high rate of cancer which is rare in wild animals.

In 2017, after studying various approaches to remediation for the Palos Verdes Shelf, the EPA decided to leave the waste in place, and cover it with a layer of sediment.

In 2019, a team of scientists led by David Valentine from the University of California at Santa Barbara published images of discarded barrels, chemical measurements of DDT in seafloor sediments and sonar maps of seafloor debris, pointing to disposal of DDT and other waste streams near one of the historical disposal sites.

In 2020, the US Corps of Army Engineers published a study outlining a plan to dredge sediment from Queens Gate Channel (a deep water passage leading into the of Port of Long Beach) and deposit it over the Palos Verdes Shelf.

In early 2021, a survey of the ocean floor using sonar uncovered more than 25,000 barrel-like objects on the sea floor that possibly contained DDT and other toxic chemicals. The mission included a team of 31 scientists and engineers, led by the Scripps Institution of Oceanography and the National Oceanic and Atmospheric Administration.

In 2023, an expedition led by the Scripps Institution of Oceanography re-surveyed the area, and used high-resolution photography. They confirmed the large number of barrels, and the photography revealed a large number of munitions on the ocean floor.

In 2024, a team of scientists led by David Valentine from the University of California at Santa Barbara discovered evidence low-level radioactive waste was dumped in the ocean during the 1960s. The material was probably dumped by California Salvage, a now-defunct company that also dumped DDT in the ocean during the 1960s.

=== Proposals ===
As of 2024, the EPA and the Army Corps of Engineers are actively working on remediation of the Montrose site (in Torrance) and the Palos Verdes Shelf.

None of the 14 numbered offshore locations in the 1973 SCCWRP map (see map below) have been designated as operable units of the EPA's Montrose Superfund site, and hence are not subject to remediation efforts as of 2024. However, the EPA is performing initial studies on "site 2" from the 1973 SCCWRP map.

Whether additional waste will be discovered in the ocean is an open question. According to environmental scientist Mark Gold from the Natural Resources Defense Council, “[t]he more we look, the more we find, and every new bit of information seems to be scarier than the last... This has shown just how egregious and harmful the dumping has been off our nation’s coasts, and that we have no idea how big of an issue and how big of a problem this is nationally.”

== Locations ==
The Southern California Coastal Water Research Project (SCCWRP) published a report in March 1973 that identified 14 waste dump sites in the Southern California Bight. The SCCWRP map does not include the Palos Verdes Shelf site.

The map below shows 13 of the 14 dump sites from the 1973 SCCWRP map; the missing fourteenth site is off the southern edge of the map, located at 31.847120N 118.57122W, off the coast of Mexico. The map below uses the same site numbering as the 1973 SCCWRP map.

The map below includes two sites which are not included in the 1973 map: the Palos Verdes Shelf site, and the Montrose Chemical facility in Torrance.

Chemical dump sites off Southern California shore

== List of dumped chemicals and waste ==
Chemicals and other waste that have been documented in waste sites off the Southern California shore include:

- DDT
- Munitions, including depth charges and smoke devices.
- Radioactive waste
- PCBs
- Petroleum products, including refinery wastes, filter cakes and oil drilling wastes.
- Sulfuric acid

== In film ==
- Out of Plain Sight (2025) Directed by Daniel Straub and Rosanna Xia - Documentary of UCSB professor David Valentine's discovery

== See also ==
- Marine pollution – Harmful effects to oceans caused by discarded substances
- Toxic waste – Any unwanted material which can cause harm
- Superfund sites
