= Basic Element =

Basic element is a term in algebra.

Basic Element may refer to:

- Basic Element (company)
- Basic Element (music group)

== See also ==
- Element (disambiguation)
