= Quintessence (disambiguation) =

Quintessence, in medieval cosmology and science, is the fifth element that fills the universe beyond the terrestrial sphere.

Quintessence, quintessential, or fifth essence, may also refer to:

== Literature ==
- Quintessence: The Quality of Having It, a 1983 book by Betty Cornfeld and Owen Edwards
- Works by Lawrence M. Krauss:
  - The Fifth Essence, a 1989 book
  - Quintessence: The Search for Missing Mass in the Universe, a 2000 book
- Quintessence: Basic Readings from the Philosophy of W. V. Quine, essays by Willard Van Orman Quine
- Quintessence, a 2013 science fiction book by David Walton

== Media companies ==
- Quintessence Films, film production company
- Quintessence Films Limited, British film production company
- Quintessence International Publishing Group, a publishing company founded in Berlin, Germany

== Music ==
- Quintessence Records, a budget label
- Quintessence Records (Canadian label)
- Quintessence (band), 1970s British progressive rock band specializing in Indian themes and sounds
- Quintessence (Canadian jazz quintet), a 1980s Canadian musical ensemble

=== Albums ===
- The Quintessence, by Quincy Jones and his orchestra, 1962
- Quintessence (Quintessence album), 1970
- Quintessence (Bill Evans album), 1976
- Quintessence (Borknagar album), 2000
- Quintessential, by Steam Powered Giraffe, 2016
- Quintessence (Spontaneous Music Ensemble album)
- Quintessence (Taeyang album), 2026

=== Songs ===
- "Quintessence", by Darkthrone, from album Panzerfaust
- "Quintessence", by Rotting Christ, from album Genesis
- "Quintessence", by Mastodon, from album Crack the Skye
- "In Quintessence", by Squeeze, from album East Side Story

== Other uses ==
- Quintessence (physics), a hypothetical form of dark energy, postulated to explain the accelerating expansion of the universe
- Quintessence (restaurant), a Michelin 3-star Japanese French fusion restaurant in Shinagawa, Japan
- Quintessence (horse), a thoroughbred racer (1900–1917)
- Quintessence: The Blighted Venom, a game by Freebird Games
- The Quintessence, a DC Comics group of mutually consulting cosmic beings: see resp. Ganthet section

== See also ==
- Quintessenz, an Austrian on-line civil liberties advocacy organization
- Quintessons, fictional characters from the Transformers franchise
- Fifth Element (disambiguation)
