= John Dove Isaacs =

American engineer and oceanographer (1913–1980)

John Dove Isaacs III
- Isaacs in 1971
- Born: March 28, 1913; Spokane, Washington
- Died: June 6, 1980 (aged 67); Rancho Santa Fe, California
- Education: University of California, Berkeley
- Spouse: Mary Carol nee Zander
- Scientific career
- Workplaces: Scripps Institution of Oceanography, at UCSD

John Dove Isaacs III (March 28, 1913 – June 6, 1980) was an American engineer and oceanographer. He was known for his research and contributions to the Scripps Institution of Oceanography at the University of California, San Diego.

== Early life ==
Isaacs was born in Spokane, Washington in 1913. He joined the U.S.Civilian Conservation Corps in 1933 and moved to the Siuslaw National Forest thereafter to work as a service lookout. He moved to Astoria in 1938 to work as a fisherman.

Isaacs studied engineering at the University of California, Berkeley and received his Bachelor of Science in 1944. During World War II, he worked alongside Willard Bascom to test DUKWs.

== Research at Scripps ==
Isaacs joined Scripps in 1948 as an associate oceanographer, working as a consultant to monitor Pacific nuclear tests including Operations Crossroads, Ivy, Castle, Wigwam, and Redwing. In 1952, Isaacs met William Nierenberg on the Mine Advisory Committee and was influential in convincing Nierenberg to come to Scripps.

Early in his time at Scripps, Isaacs came up with a plan to tow Antartctic icebergs to the coast of California to offset drought conditions and replenish reservoirs. The idea was dismissed due to economic constraints and ecological concerns.

Isaacs was known for his involvement in the development of the Isaacs-Kidd midwater trawl (along with Lewis Kidd) in the 1950s and 60s. He also furthered the development of the space elevator concept, which he called the 'Sky-Hook', for transport of people and materials to low Earth orbit.

Isaacs was involved with numerous research groups and boards at Scripps throughout his career: The Marine Life Gesearch Group from 1958 to 1974, interim director of the Institution of Marine Resources from 1961 to 1962 (and the director from 1971 to 1980), a consultant for the Southern California Coastal Water Research Project from 1969 to 1980, and was elected president of the Foundation for Ocean Research in 1976.

== Personal life ==
Isaacs was a lifelong fisherman and spent much of his time in Oregon fishing near the Columbia River, Grays Harbor, and Tillamook Bay. He married Mary Carol Zander while living in Oregon and together they had four children.

Isaacs died on June 6, 1980, after spending months fighting cancer.

== Honors ==
Isaacs was honored by being elected to the American Geophysical Union, the National Academy of Sciences, the National Academy of Engineering, and the American Academy of Arts and Sciences.

Scripps honored Isaacs posthumously by creating the John Dove Isaacs Chair in Natural Philosophy. Isaacs hall on Scripps campus is named after him.

The research vessel RV John Isaacs was named after him.
