= Innophos =

Manufacturer of specialty phosphates and minerals

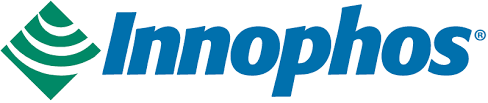
- Formerly: Rhodia, Rhone Poulenc, Stauffer Chemical, Victor Chemical
- Industry: Chemicals; Minerals
- Founded: 1902
- Headquarters: Cranbury, New Jersey, United States
- Key people: Richard Hooper, CEO and President
- Products: Purified phosphoric acid; Specialty phosphates; Chelated minerals
- Owner: One Rock Capital Partners
- Number of employees: 1500 (2024)

Innophos is a North American manufacturer of specialty phosphates, chelated minerals, and other ingredients for the food & beverage, industrial, health, and pharmaceutical industries. Originally formed as the Victor Chemical Company in 1902, the company was later acquired by Stauffer Chemical and subsequently sold to Rhône-Poulenc, which later became part of Rhodia. In 2004, Rhodia sold its North American phosphate business to Bain Capital, which formed Innophos. The name "Innophos" signifies innovative specialty phosphates.

Headquartered in Cranbury, New Jersey, the company operates 9 manufacturing locations in the United States, Mexico, Canada, and China. Innophos is known for the breadth and quality of its phosphate and mineral product portfolios. The company also emphasizes sustainability and safety as core pillars of its operations.

== History ==
- 1902: Victor Chemical Works developed a standardized manufacturing process for purified phosphates. The company was founded to promote these products in a broad array of applications including baking powder, pharmaceuticals, dentifrices, fertilizers, matches and fireworks.
- 1959: Victor Chemical Works became a division of Stauffer Chemical.
- 1985: Stauffer Chemical is acquired by Chesebrough-Ponds Inc.
- 1987: Imperial Chemicals Industries (ICI) purchased Stauffer Chemical.
- 1987: Imperial Chemicals Industries (ICI) sold Stauffer Chemical to Rhône-Poulenc S.A.
- 1998: Rhone Poulenc spins off chemical, plastics, and fibers business units into a new company, Rhodia.
- 2004: Rhodia sells its North American phosphate business to Bain Capital. Bain Capital names the company Innophos, a name which signifies innovative specialty phosphates.
- 2006: Innophos becomes a publicly traded company on NASDAQ using the ticker symbol - IPHS.
- 2011–2017: Innophos acquires several companies in the mineral and botanical space including Kelatron, AMT, Chelated Minerals International, Triarco, Novel Ingredients and others.
- 2020: The sale of Innophos to One Rock Capital Partners was completed on February 7, 2020.

== Business ==
Innophos is a global producer of specialty phosphates and chelated minerals, creating relevant solutions for the food & beverage, health & nutrition, and industrial markets. Innophos has administrative and manufacturing facilities in the United States in Illinois, Louisiana, New Jersey, Utah, and Tennessee. In addition, Innophos has offices and manufacturing facilities in other countries including China, Canada and Mexico.

Additionally, Innophos provides ingredients for industrial applications including fire-resistant materials, corrosion inhibitors, asphalt modifiers, H_{2}S scavengers, cleaners, and water-soluble fertilizers.
