= David Valentine =

David Valentine may refer to:

- David Valentine (scientist) (1973-), American geochemist and microbiologist
- David H. Valentine (1912–1987), British botanist
- Dave Valentine (1926–1976), Scottish rugby player
