= Degree of difficulty =

Measure of difficulty in sport

Degree of difficulty (DD, sometimes called tariff or grade) is a rating used in several sports and other competitions to indicate the technical difficulty of a skill, performance, or course, often as a factor in scoring. Sports which incorporate a degree of difficulty in scoring include bouldering, cross-country skiing, diving, equestrianism, figure skating, freestyle skiing, gymnastics, rhythmic gymnastics, surfing, synchronized swimming and trampoline. Degree of difficulty is typically intended to be an objective measure, in sports whose scoring may also rely on subjective judgments of performance.

== By sport ==
=== Diving ===
The International Swimming Federation computes the degree of difficulty of dives according to a five-part formula, incorporating height, number of somersaults and twists, positioning, approach, and entry. The total judges' score is multiplied by the dive's degree of difficulty to determine the total score.

=== Figure skating ===
In figure skating, each jump element is assigned a base value, reflective of its difficulty. These base values take into account factors including the number of rotations and edges used. When skaters perform a jump element, it is identified by the technical panel. For each element identified, the judging panel assigns a grade of execution (GOE) score ranging from -5 to 5 based on its execution by the skater. The GOE score is then added to or subtracted from the jump element's base value to determine a total score for each element. The sum of scores for each element performed forms the technical score component of the skater's total score.

=== Freestyle skiing ===
In the freestyle skiing discipline of aerials, the International Ski Federation pre-assigns a degree of difficulty score for each jump ranging from 2.050 to 5.000 for men and 2.050 to 5.300 for women. Each total judge's score is multiplied by the jump's degree of difficulty to determine a competitor's final score. A greater number of flips and twists increases degree of difficulty scores for jumps.

=== Gridiron football ===
In American football, kicking a field goal is worth three points regardless of the distance from which it is kicked; however, the distance plays into the likelihood that a field goal is successfully scored. For instance, from 30 yards out, there is roughly a 95% chance of success, compared to 65% from 50 yards.

In fantasy football, the degree of difficulty for a field goal factors into scoring, by awarding more points for longer field goals: 3 points for 17-39 yards; 4 points for 40-49 yards; 5 points for 50-59 yards; and 6 points for 60 or more yards.

=== Gymnastics ===
In artistic gymnastics, each skill is assigned a letter grade and difficulty value ranging from 0.1 to 1.0 by the International Gymnastics Federation (FIG) based on the Code of Points. The eight highest-rated skills performed by women or the ten highest-rated skills moves performed by men are counted to give the difficulty score component of the final score. An exception to this is the vault event where each move has a pre-determined difficulty score.

In rhythmic gymnastics, each skill is also assigned a letter grade and difficulty value. However, the difficulty score is based on every skill performed during the routine, rather than the eight or ten highest-rated skills like in artistic gymnastics.

Degree of difficulty is also enhanced by connecting skills together in combination.

==== Trampoline ====
The FIG gives difficulty points for number of somersaults, number of body twists and the body position in somersaults (piked or straight). The total sum of the individual elements forms the difficulty score component of competitor's final score:

- Each 1/4 rotation of a somersault = 0.1 DD
- Completed 360° somersault (bonus) = 0.1 DD
- Each 1/2 twist = 0.1 DD
- Single somersaults without twist in pike/straight position = 0.1 DD
- Somersaults over 720° in pike/straight position = 0.2 DD

=== Other sports ===
- Grade (bouldering)
- Grade (climbing)
- International Scale of River Difficulty

== See also ==
- Adjudicator
- Balance (game design) § Difficulty level
- Element (sports)
- Referee
- Umpire
