= Montrose Chemical Corporation of California =

Largest producer of insecticide DDT in U.S.

- Industry: Chemical industry
- Founded: 1947
- Defunct: 1982, 34–35 years active
- Headquarters: Torrance, California, United States (Postal address)
- Key people: Samuel Rotrosen; Pincus Rothberg
- Products: Chemicals, notably DDT
- Superfund site
- Location: Los Angeles, Los Angeles, California; 33°50′55″N 118°18′3″W

Information
- Contaminants: DDT

Progress

The Montrose Chemical Corporation of California was a chemical corporation that was the largest producer of the insecticide DDT in the United States from 1947 until it stopped production in 1982. The president of Montrose was Pincus Rothberg before 1968, and Samuel Rotrosen thereafter.

Montrose Chemical Corporation improperly disposed chemical waste from DDT production, resulting in serious environmental damage to the Pacific Ocean near Los Angeles.

Montrose's former main plant in Harbor Gateway South area of Los Angeles near Torrance, California has been designated as a Superfund site by the United States Environmental Protection Agency.

== Environmental impact ==
Between the late 1950s and early 1970s, Montrose was responsible for discharging an estimated 1700 tons of DDT into the ocean via the county's sewer system, which contaminated sediment on the ocean floor off the coast of Los Angeles. In addition, the company dumped hundreds of thousands of barrels containing waste laced with DDT at a deep sea site located between the California coast and Santa Catalina Island during the same time period.

Some of the barrels were dumped considerably closer to the coast than the designated deep sea site, and many of the barrels were punctured beforehand to ensure that they would sink. In 2011 and 2013, Professor David Valentine and a research team at UC Santa Barbara discovered barrels of DDT leaking on the ocean floor which extended well beyond the spills at Montrose's Superfund site. A grant was awarded to the Scripps Institution of Oceanography in 2022 to fully characterize the dumpsite situation.

DDT and polychlorinated biphenyls (PCBs) move from contaminated sediments into the water, so although the dumping of DDT stopped in 1982, the Palos Verdes Shelf remains contaminated. DDT and PCBs enter the food chain through worms and micro-organisms living in the sediment. Fish may eat many of these organisms, causing the DDT and PCBs to accumulate in fish tissue. Fish-eating birds, marine mammals, and birds of prey that feed on both accumulate more of the toxins.

Since 1985, fish consumption advisories and health warnings have been posted in Southern California because of elevated DDT and PCB levels. Bottom-feeding fish are particularly at risk for high contamination levels. Consumption of white croaker, which has the highest contamination levels, should be avoided. Other bottom-feeding fish, including kelp bass, rockfish, queenfish, black croaker, sheepshead, surfperches and sculpin, are also highly contaminated. As a part of the Superfund project, the EPA is looking to reinforce the commercial and recreational fishing ban on white croaker.

Until as recently as 2007, bald eagles on Santa Catalina Island were unable to reproduce because the DDT caused their eggshells to become too thin and to break open before the eagle was fully developed. California sea lions have high levels of DDT and a high rate of cancer which is rare in wild animals.

== Lawsuits ==
In October 1989, the former Montrose Chemical site was added to the Superfund National Priorities List. In 1990, the United States and California filed lawsuits against Montrose Chemical and nine other facilities near the Palos Verdes peninsula, citing damages to the nearby marine environment.

In December 2000, the Montrose Chemical Corporation of California and three other corporations settled their lawsuits for a collective $77 million. When combined with prior lawsuits, this brought the total up to $140 million to fund the restoration of the Palos Verdes Shelf marine environment.

The issue of insurance coverage under Montrose Chemical's insurance policies for cleanup costs has been litigated for many decades in California courts, resulting in landmark opinions of the Supreme Court of California in 1993, 1995, and 2020.

== See also ==
- Stauffer Chemical
