= Stauffer Chemical =

American chemical company

Stauffer Chemical Company
- Logo in use in 1977
- Industry: Chemical
- Founded: 1886 in San Francisco, California, United States
- Founders: John Stauffer Sr. Christian de Guigné
- Headquarters: USA
- Products: Fabricated Plastic products and Agricultural Chemicals

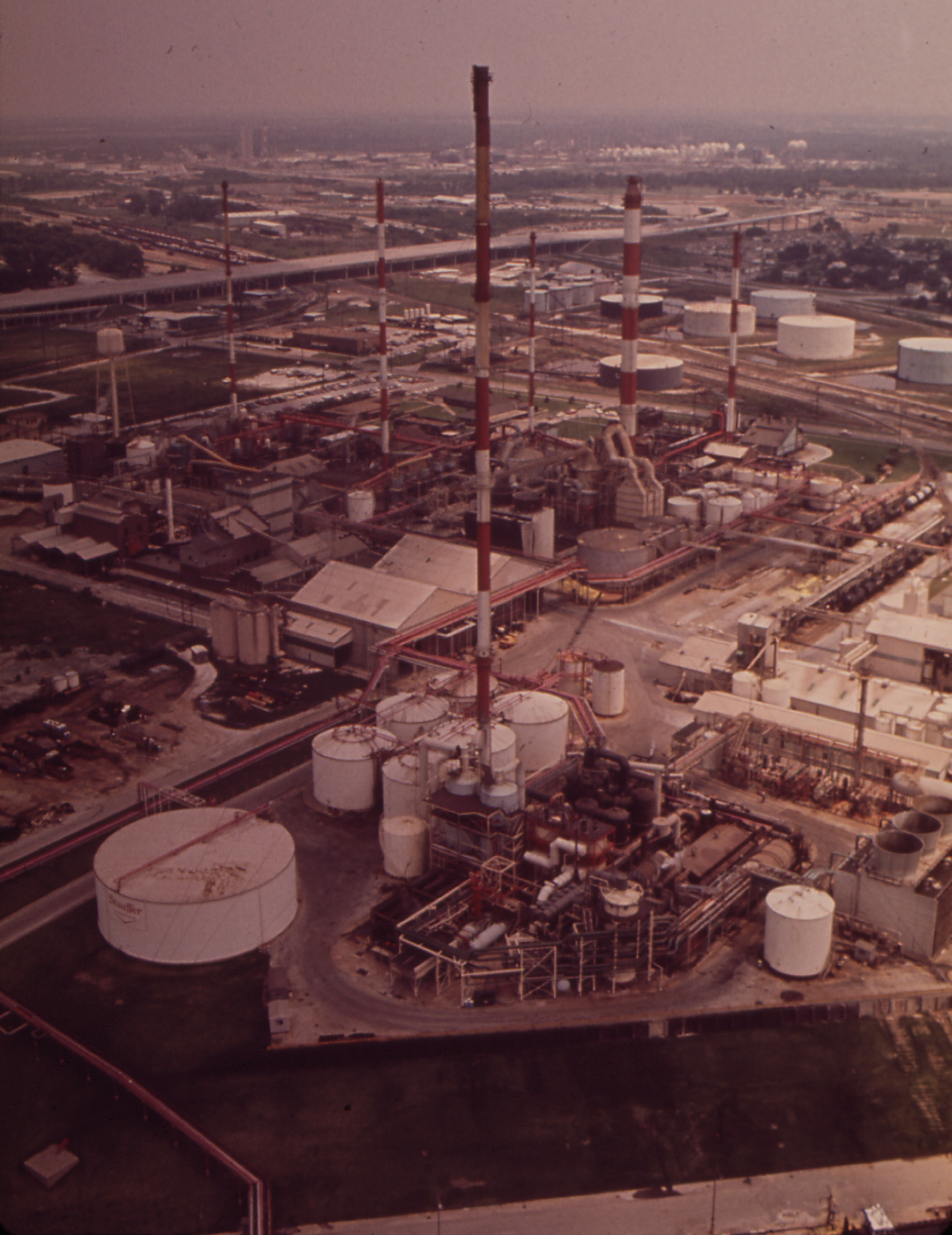
The Stauffer Chemical Company plant in Houston in June 1972

Stauffer Chemical Company was an American chemical company which manufactured herbicides and pesticides for various agricultural crops. It was acquired by Imperial Chemical Industries from Chesebrough-Pond's Inc. in 1987. In 1987, Stauffer's head office was in Westport, Connecticut. Late that year, Imperial sold Stauffer's basic chemicals business to Rhône-Poulenc S.A.

== History ==
The company was founded in 1885 in San Francisco as a partnership between two young Europeans; a German, John Stauffer Sr., and a Frenchman, Christian de Guigné. Ships exporting wheat to Europe used stone from the chalk cliffs of Dover as ballast. This discarded ballast became the inexpensive raw material for precipitated calcium carbonate at the newly formed company. The company was incorporated by John Stauffer Sr., who died on March 4, 1940, at the age of 78.

In 1931, the company announced plans for a new manufacturing subsidiary, the Pacific Hard Rubber Company.

Hans Stauffer, nephew of founder John Stauffer Sr, who joined his uncle at Stauffer Chemicals in 1920 and who retired as president in 1967, died in 1986.

John Stauffer Jr., director emeritus of the company and son of the company's founder, died in 1972. The John Stauffer Laboratory for Physical Chemistry, the John Stauffer Chemistry Building at Stanford University, and the John Stauffer Science Center at Whittier College are all named after him.

== Pollution and site contamination ==
A Stauffer Chemical factory in Tarpon Springs, Florida in Pinellas County (28.16666°N 082.77569°W), produced elemental phosphorus from phosphate ore operated from 1947 until 1981. The factory was originally operated by Victor Chemical Company, and was acquired by Stauffer Chemical in 1960. The United States Environmental Protection Agency reported that "Site operations resulted in the contamination of soils, ground water, and waste ponds on the property. The main contaminants of concern (COCs) in soil include arsenic, antimony, beryllium, elemental phosphorus, polynuclear aromatic hydrocarbons (PAHs), radium-226, and thallium."

== 1982 and 1983 earnings dispute ==
In 1984, the company was accused by the U.S. Securities and Exchange Commission of overstating its 1982 and 1983 earnings through non-standard accounting.

== Phosphorus trichloride plant ==
The company was in the headlines in the mid-1980s for selling its design for a chemical plant to make phosphorus trichloride to Krebs A.G., a Swiss company. The plant modeled after a Stauffer plant in Pennsylvania, was subsequently built by Krebs for El Nasr Pharmaceutical Company of Egypt. Phosphorus trichloride is well known for its dual use capacity as a precursor for the manufacture of organophosphates including both pesticides and nerve agents such as Sarin and Tabun.

== See also ==
- Montrose Chemical Corporation of California
- Chemical industry
