= Elementary =

Elementary may refer to:

== Arts, entertainment, and media ==
=== Music ===
- Elementary (Cindy Morgan album), 2001
- Elementary (The End album), 2007
- Elementary, a Melvin "Wah-Wah Watson" Ragin album, 1977

=== Other uses in arts, entertainment, and media ===
- Elementary (TV series), a 2012 American drama television series
- "Elementary, my dear Watson", a catchphrase of Sherlock Holmes

== Education ==
- Elementary and Secondary Education Act, US
- Elementary education, or primary education, the first years of formal, structured education
- Elementary Education Act 1870, England and Wales
- Elementary school, a school providing elementary or primary education

== Science and technology ==
- ELEMENTARY, a class of objects in computational complexity theory
- Elementary, a widget set based on the Enlightenment Foundation Libraries
- Elementary abelian group, an abelian group in which every nontrivial element is of prime order
- Elementary algebra
- Elementary arithmetic
- Elementary charge, e, of a single electron
- Elementary definition, in mathematical logic
- elementary OS, a Linux distribution
- Elementary particle, in particle physics
- Elementary proof
- Elementary function

== See also ==
- Element (disambiguation)
- Elemental (disambiguation)
