= Southern California Bight =

Curved stretch of coastline in Southern California and northwestern Baja California

- Ensenada del sur de California
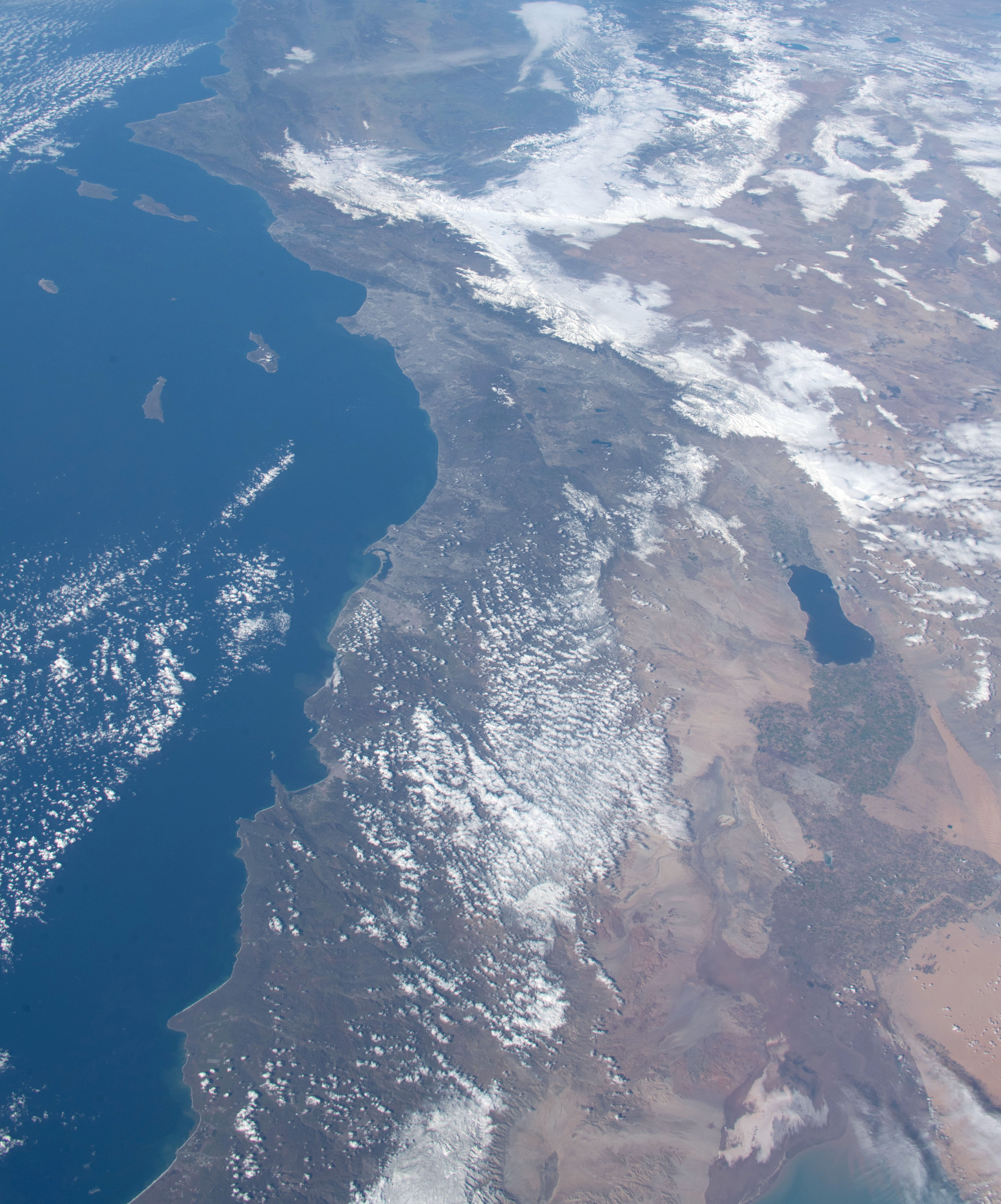
- ISS view of the Southern California Bight, which stretches from Point Conception (top left) to Punta Colonet (bottom left)
- Interactive map of Southern California Bight
- Location: California, United States; Baja California, Mexico
- Coordinates: 32°43′N 118°21′W
- Max. length: 692 km (430 mi)

The Southern California Bight is a 692-kilometer-long (430 mi) stretch of curved coastline that runs along the West Coast of the United States and Mexico, from Point Conception in California to Punta Colonet in Baja California, plus the area of the Pacific Ocean defined by that curve. This includes the Channel Islands of California and the Coronado Islands and Islas de Todo Santos of Baja California.

The region is known for having a climate similar to that of the Mediterranean, consisting of rainy winters and dry summers. The Southern California Bight has a thriving ecosystem that is home to many species of plant life, fish, birds, and mammals.

== History ==
Various Native American peoples occupied the lands in and around the Southern California Bight for tens of thousands of years before the arrival of Europeans. When Spanish explorers arrived in the 16th century the Chumash people occupied the northern coastal region of the bight, as well as the four Northern Channel Islands, and the Tongva (or Gabrieleño) occupied the Los Angeles Basin and Southern Channel Islands. The Payómkawichum and Kumeyaay occupied the southern portion of the bight.

In 1542, at present day San Diego Bay, Juan Rodríguez Cabrillo of Spain, along with his crew, were the first European explorers to land in the region. Cabrillo is said to have been buried on one of the Channel Islands. The first permanent European settlers of the Southern California Bight, led by Juan Pérez, arrived in 1769 on the San Antonio. The Spanish government had planned a three-part occupation plan to check Russian settlement in Alta California.

In 2013-14, scientists witnessed the largest die-off of sea stars ever recorded along the Pacific Coast. The outbreak of sea star wasting disease caused significant changes to the ecosystem as sea stars are a keystone species that plays an important role in controlling the numbers of other creatures.

== Geography ==
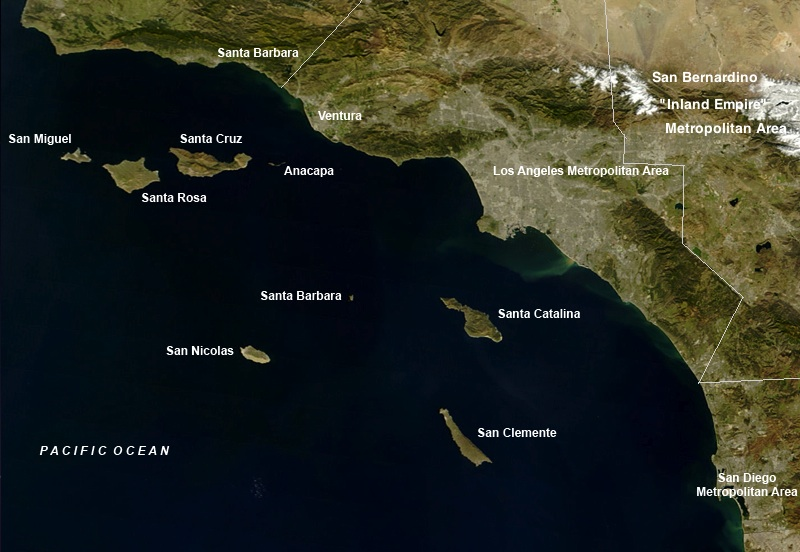
Satellite view of the Southern California Bight in California, including the Channel Islands

The Southern California Bight stretches for about 692 km (430 mi) along the Pacific coast of North America, of which about 456 km (283 mi) is located within the United States and 236 km (147 mi) is located within Mexico. The rough midpoint of the bight is located about 8 km (5.0 mi) southeast of San Clemente in San Onofre State Beach.

=== Coastal topography ===
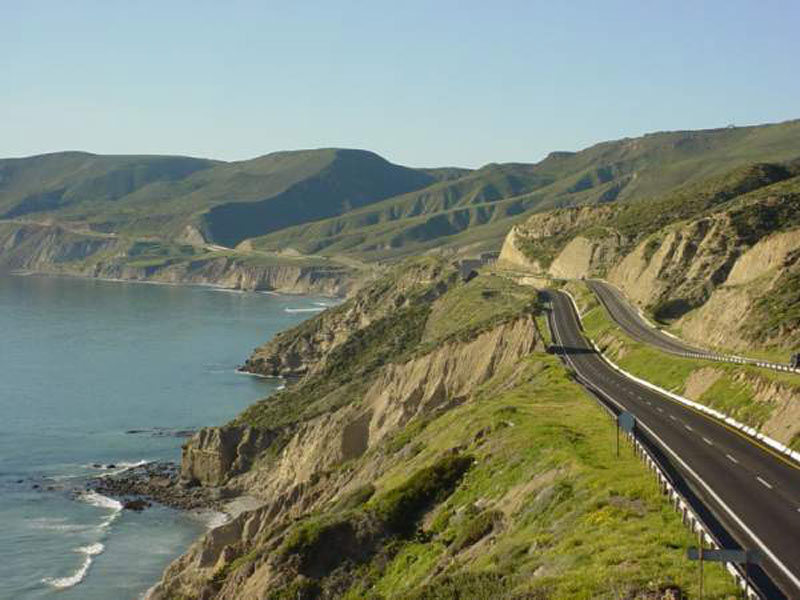
Mountainous stretch of coastline between Tijuana and Ensenada, Baja California

The coastal topography of the Southern California Bight is varied, featuring alluvial plains and marine terraces broken up by mountains of the Transverse and Peninsular Ranges. Numerous islands lie off the coast, the largest of which is Santa Cruz Island of the Channel Islands.

The northern and central portions of the bight are largely urbanized within the Greater Los Angeles and San Diego-Tijuana metropolitan areas, while the rest remains largely rural. Other major cities located along the bight include Santa Barbara, Ventura, Oxnard, Playas de Rosarito, and Ensenada. Apart from Camp Pendleton between Orange and San Diego Counties, the Gaviota Coast in Santa Barbara County, California is the last undeveloped stretch of Southern California coastline with dramatic bluffs, isolated beaches and terraced grasslands.

=== Submarine topography ===
Notable submarine features include Hueneme Canyon, La Jolla Canyon, Newport Canyon, and Redondo Canyon.

=== Bodies of water ===
Major bodies of water that are part of the Southern California Bight include:

- Alamitos Bay
- All Saints Bay
- Capistrano Bight
- Gulf of Santa Catalina
- La Jolla Cove
- Newport Bay
- Salsipuedes Bay
- San Diego Bay
- San Pedro Bay
- Santa Barbara Channel
- Santa Monica Bay

== Climate ==
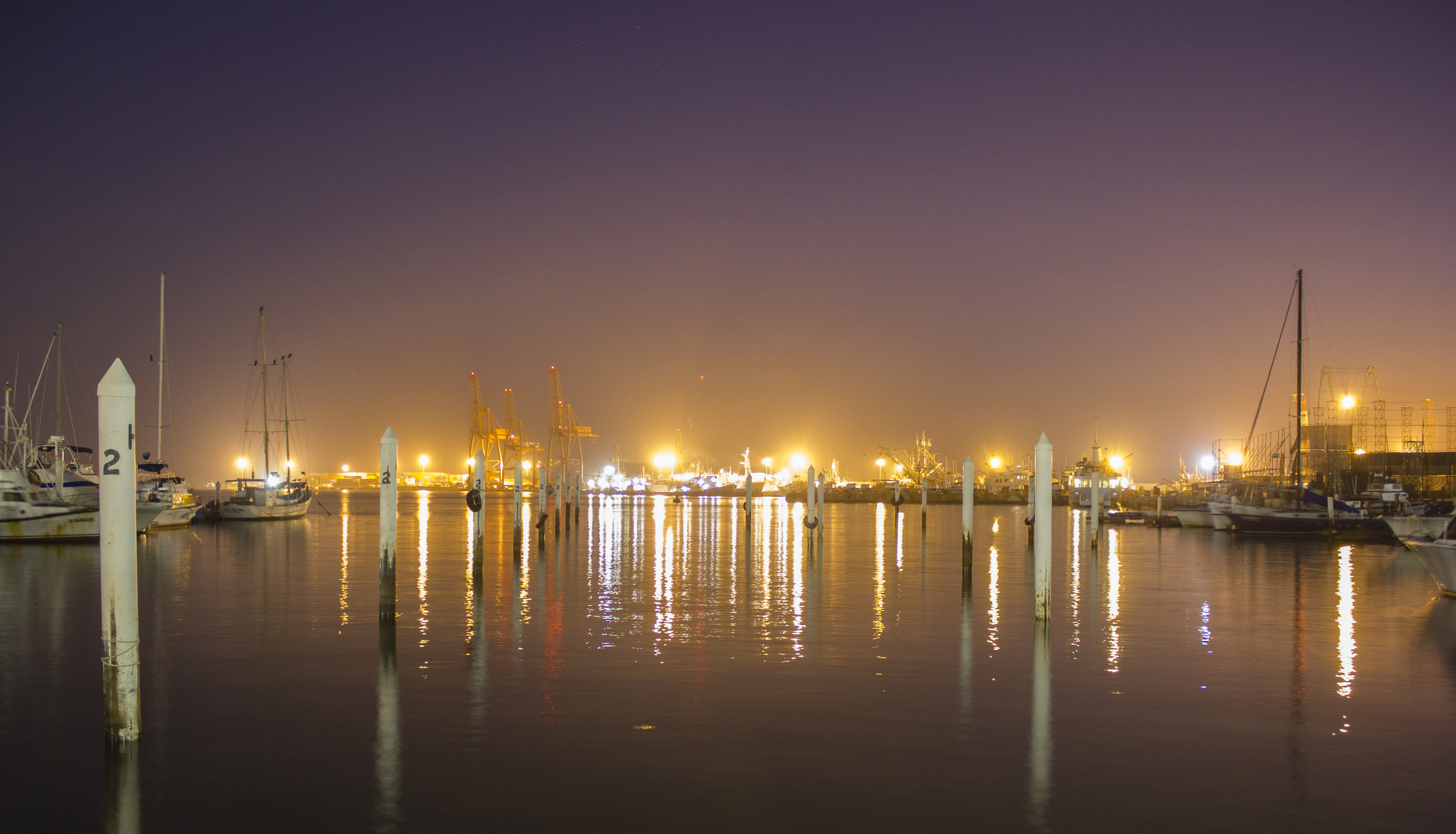
Coastal fog blankets the city of Ensenada on an April evening. The fog typically evaporates by midday.

The northern portion of the bight features a predominantly Mediterranean climate (Köppen Csb) with hot, dry summers and mild, wet winters. The central and southern portions of the bight feature a predominantly semi-arid climate (Köppen Bsk) with hot, dry summers and cool, wet winters. A marine layer typically forms just off the coast during late spring and early summer, blanketing coastal communities in cooler air which, if saturated, also contains fog.

There is a difference in monthly mean temperature of −12 °C (10 °F) between the cities of Los Angeles and San Diego. Most precipitation in this coastal area takes place in the months of December, January, and February with a monthly mean rate of 2.0–3.3 inches (51–84 mm)

== Biology ==
The Southern California Bight acts as a transition between many different water masses, including the Pacific subarctic, Pacific equatorial, and the North Pacific central water masses. Due to its central location, the fish fauna includes species native to these other water masses. A total of 481 species of California marine fish, 195 species of birds, and seven species of pinnipeds inhabit the Southern California Bight.

=== Phytoplankton ===
Phytoplankton serve an important role in the Southern Californian coastal ecosystem. These single-celled organisms are the main food source for zooplankton and help support the fish population. In doing so, they help establish a stable food chain for all the animals in the coastal region. Since the population of fish is directly related to the production of phytoplankton, the growth in phytoplankton numbers increases the yield of local fisheries.

=== Fish ===
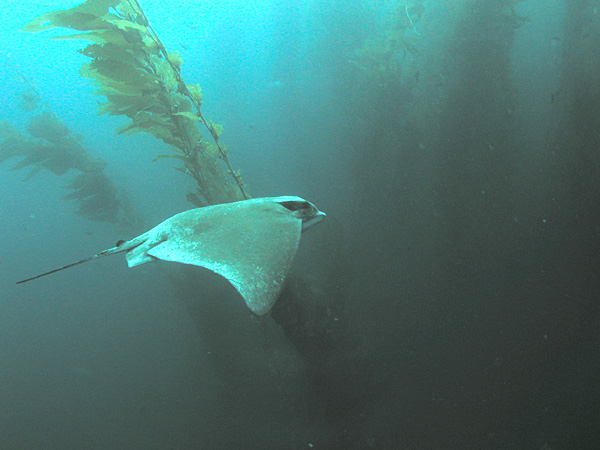
A bat ray in a kelp forest located off the coast of San Clemente Island

The Southern California Bight is home to 481 species of fish, including endangered species such as the Cowcod rockfish, Bronzespotted rockfish, and Giant Sea Bass.

Common fish found in the epipelagic zone include:

- Northern anchovy (Engraulis mordax)
- Pacific Barracuda (Sphyraena argentea)
- Pacific mackerel (Scomber australasicus)
- Pacific bonito (Sarda chiliensis)
- Chub mackerel (Scomber japonicus)
- Yellowtail (Seriola lalandi dorsalis)
- Blue shark (Prionace glauca)
- Shortfin mako shark (Isurus oxyrinchus)
- Swordfish (Xiphias gladius)

Common fish found in the neritic zone include:

- Queenfish (Seriphus politus)
- White croaker (Genyonemus lineatus)
- Pacific butterfish (Peprilus simillimus)
- Walleye surfperch (Hyperprosopon anale)
- Vermilion rockfish (Sebastes miniatus)
- Bocaccio rockfish (S. paucispinis)
- Lingcod (Ophiodon elongatus)

Common fish found in the rocky intertidal zone include:

- Woody sculpin (Clinocottus analis)
- Rockpool blenny (Hypsoblennius gilberti)
- Spotted kelpfish (Gibbonsia elegans)

Many different species of fish rely on the kelp forests as a source of life. Populations of fish are larger in areas with a higher concentration of kelp. Fish that live in and rely on kelp forests include kelp surfperch (Brachyistius frenatus), kelp bass (Paralabrax clathratus), giant kelpfish (Heterostichus rostratus), and kelp rockfish (Sebastes atrovirens). A study conducted near San Luis Obispo, California showed that when kelp was removed from a nearby reef, fish biomass declined by 63%. Juvenile fish rely on kelp beds as nursery grounds. Southern California Edison built a 174-acre kelp reef (70 ha) off San Clemente in 2008.

Basking sharks (Cetorhinus maximus) are being studied through a research program begun in 2009 by NOAA.

=== Birds ===
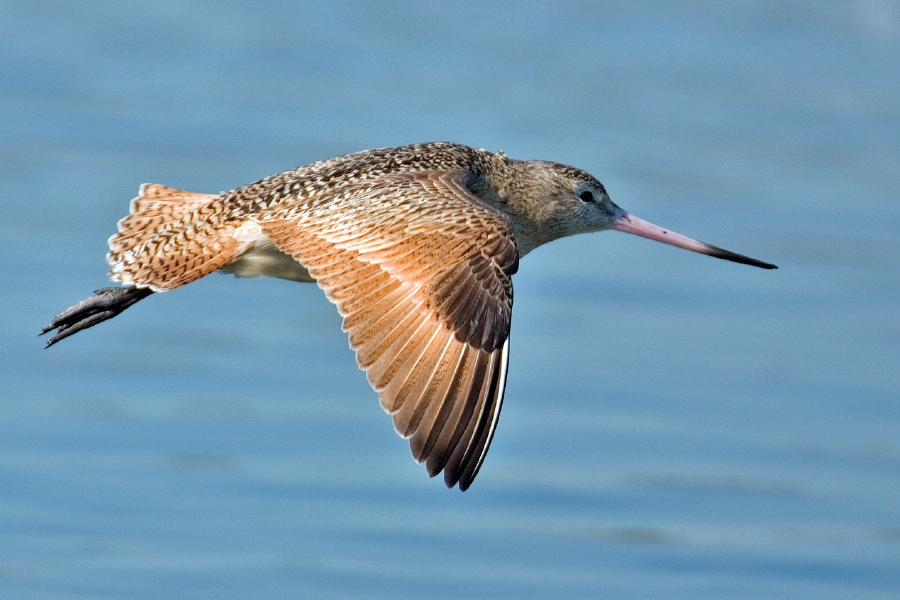
Marbled godwit in flight in Bolsa Chica Ecological Reserve

The Southern California Bight is home to 195 species of birds, including endangered species such as the light-footed clapper rail (Rallus longirostris levipes). Some birds nest and hunt near bodies of waters, such as bays, harbors, and oceans, including areas where kelp grows. Some species, such as the brown pelican and some species of cormorants commonly dive head first into the water, attempting to catch fish. Other species of birds, such as grebes and loons migrate from Baja California over the nearshore waters, and will stop to fish and feed. Birds that live in the rocky shore have adapted to finding food, and specialize in prying grabbing prey that clings to the rocky shore. Common birds of the rocky seashore include black oystercatchers (Haemotopus bachmani), wandering tattlers (Heteroscelus incanus), and Surfbirds (Aphorize virgata). Other birds, such as sandpipers, egrets, and herons utilize tidal patterns, venturing out to rocks during low tide in hopes of catching prey. Non-seabirds also nest on rocky seashore surfaces. Peregrine falcons and ravens are known to nest on remote sea cliffs. Sandy beaches are inhabited by plovers, terns, marbled godwits (Limosa fedoa), and several species of gulls.

=== Marine mammals ===
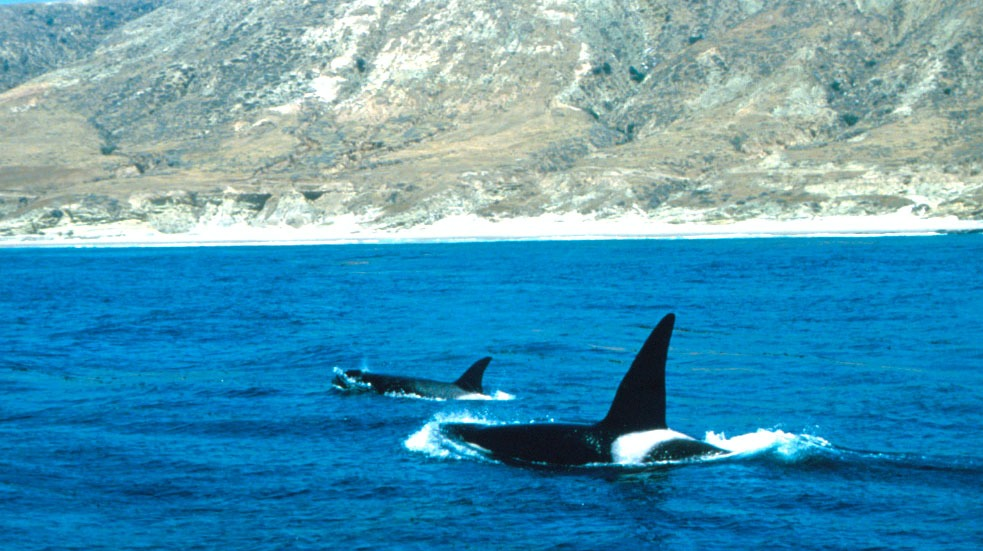
Orcas off Santa Rosa Island

Due to its central location of warm and cool ocean currents, the Southern California Bight sees a wide variety of marine mammals. Some reside here regularly, some pass through on migratory routes, and others only show up to utilize a certain food source. The Marine Mammal Protection Act and Endangered Species Act helped to prevent any marine mammal "take", which entails hunting, harassing, exploiting marine mammals for their pelt, meat, oil, etc.

==== Pinnipeds ====
The most abundant pinnipeds in the Southern California Bight are the California sea lions. Northern elephant seals are known to have breeding grounds in the Southern California Bight, mostly on San Miguel and San Nicolas islands. Sea otters were once common in the Southern California Bight, but due to hunting, they have since mostly retreated to northern waters. Otter sightings in the Southern California Bight happen rarely.

==== Cetaceans ====
Gray whales pass through the Southern California Bight on their migration routes, typically migrating very close to land. They pass through the Southern California Bight on their southbound route from December through February towards Baja California, and return northbound towards southern Alaska, passing the Southern California Bight from February to May. Their migration patterns are among the longest of any mammal, spanning over 10,000 miles (16,100 km). Blue whales also use the Southern California Bight as a part of their migratory routes. They leave Baja California by early summer, and are usually present in the Southern California Bight in June. The common dolphin is the most abundant cetacean in the Southern California Bight. Common dolphins typically appear in the Southern California Bight during years with warmer water, and are more abundant in the summer and winter.

=== Other marine life ===
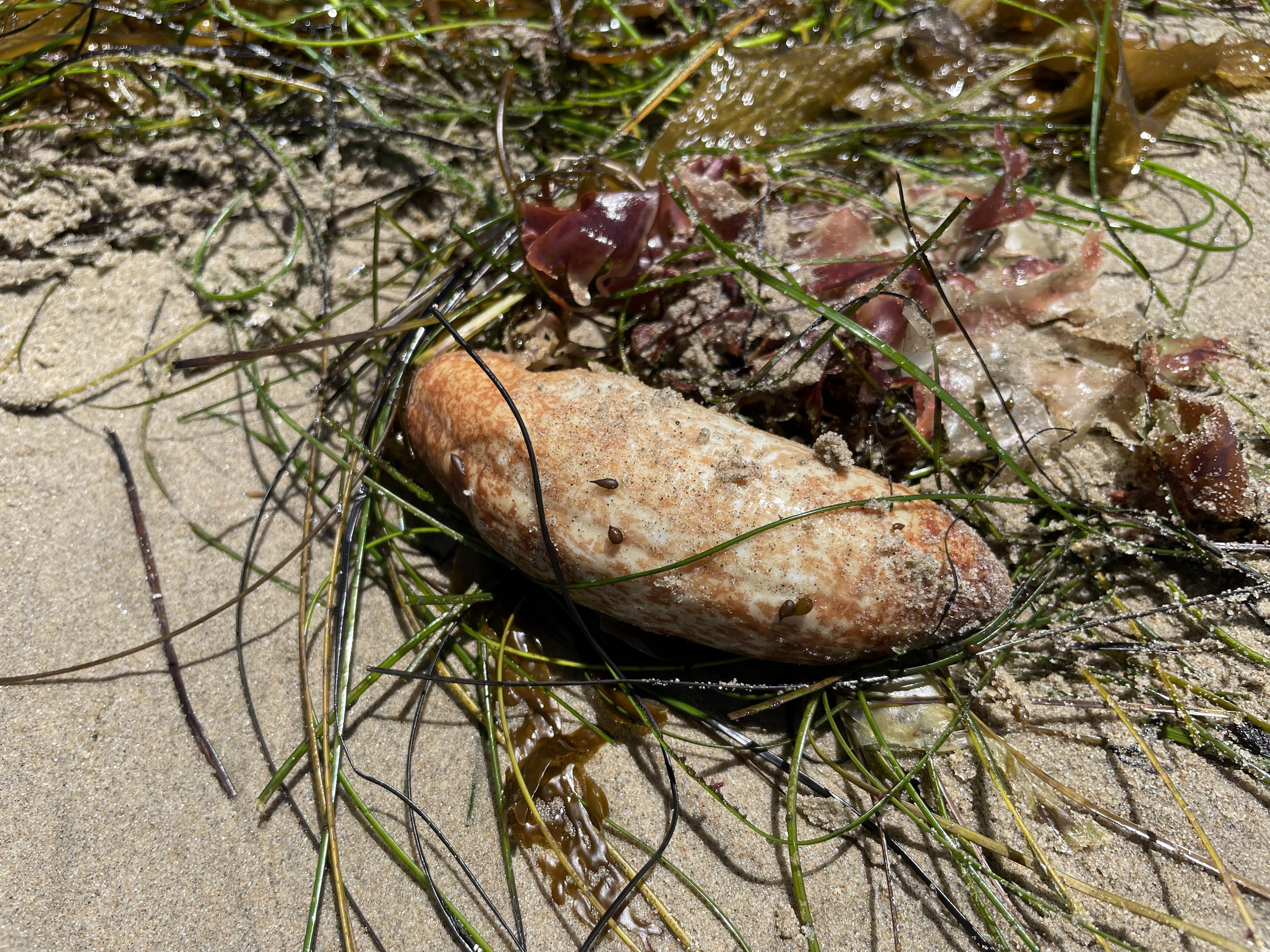
A sweet potato sea cucumber found washed up on a beach in Santa Barbara, California

The sweet potato sea cucumber (Caudina arenicola) is an endemic species of sea cucumber that digs burrows in loose coastal sediments along the entire length of the bight. The sea cucumbers are often preyed upon by sea birds and larger marine animals.

- Sea urchin
- California spiny lobster
- Rock scallop

== Natural resources ==
The Southern California Bight is characterized by coastal and offshore oil reserves. For the past century, the offshore areas of coastal cities such as Goleta, Santa Monica, and Huntington Beach have been home to oil extraction sites. With the presence of these oil reserves comes the construction of relative infrastructure including pipelines.

Other primary resources that come from the Southern California Bight region include anchovies, sardines, mackerel, and bass. The thriving marine life and accessible seafood source has led to the development of harbors and marinas all across the Southern California coast.

== Preservation ==
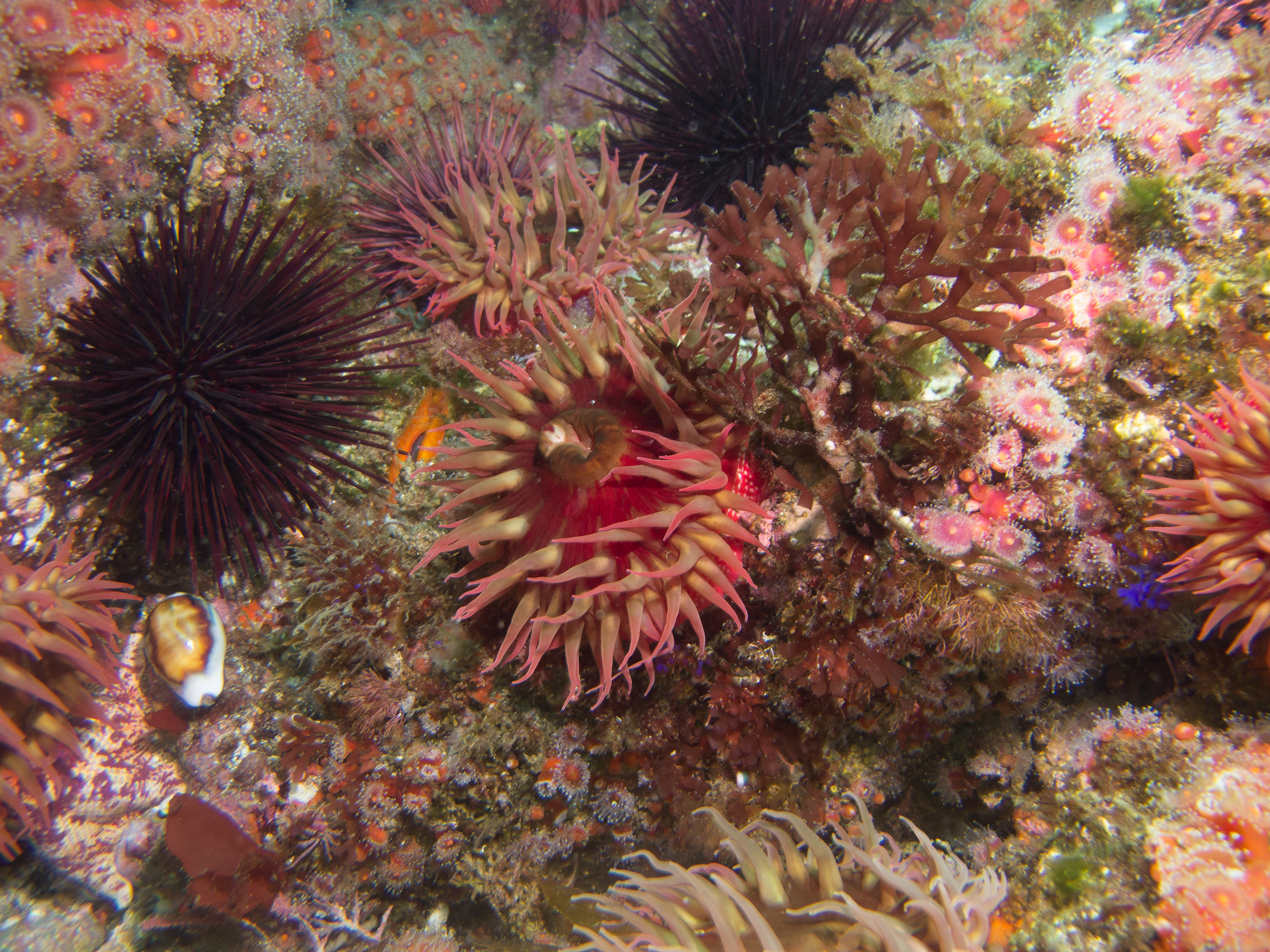
Marine life off Santa Cruz Island

The entire coast of California along the bight, including all islands within 12 nautical miles of the mainland, are protected within California Coastal National Monument. The waters around the Channel Islands are protected within both Channel Islands National Park and Channel Islands National Marine Sanctuary.

In Baja California, the ecology of Guadalupe Island, Isla Todos Santos, and the Coronado Islands are protected within the Baja California Pacific Islands Marine Conservation Area.

== See also ==
- Chemical dumps in ocean off Southern California
- Gulf of the Farallones
