= Southern California Coastal Water Research Project =

Joint powers government authority

The Southern California Coastal Water Research Project (SCCWRP) is a research institute focusing on the coastal ecosystems of Southern California from watersheds to the ocean. SCCWRP was created as a joint powers authority (JPA), which is an agency formed when multiple government agencies have a common mission that can be better achieved by pooling resources and knowledge. The purpose of SCCWRP is to gather the necessary scientific information to allow member agencies to effectively and cost-efficiently steward the Southern California coastal environment.

== Location ==
SCCWRP is located in Costa Mesa, California. SCCWRP's original location (in 1969) was Westwood, California, with subsequent offices in El Segundo, Long Beach and Westminster before moving to the present location in 2007.

== Research ==
SCCWRP’s research foci include collaborative regional environmental monitoring, development of assessment tools to characterize environmental conditions, and modeling and analysis to answer relevant environmental management questions. Significant research topics include regional monitoring of the Southern California Bight, beach water quality, hydromodification, wetlands, eutrophication, marine debris, and contaminants of emerging concern. The organization also works to transition new technologies to the user community, and foster communication among different stakeholder sectors, including regulatory agencies, wastewater dischargers, stormwater managers, academic researchers, nonprofit groups, technology developers, and industries affected by aquatic and marine resources.

== History ==
SCCWRP was formed in 1969, at about the time when California’s Porter-Cologne Water Quality Control Act was passed, to prepare an integrative report about the effects of wastewater and other discharges on the Southern California coastal marine environment. Though originally intended as a three-year project, SCCWRP was reauthorized to conduct further research in 1972 owing to the many data gaps identified in the summary report. The JPA has since been amended several times, extending SCCWRP’s existence through to the present day.

== Member Agencies ==
SCCWRP's original member agencies in 1969 included the five largest southern California metropolitan sanitation agencies (City of San Diego, City of Los Angeles, Los Angeles County Sanitation District, Orange County Sanitation District, and Ventura County). In subsequent years, additional member agencies were added to the JPA.

These include water quality regulatory agencies added in 1990 (United States Environmental Protection Agency, Region IX; California State Water Resources Control Board; Los Angeles Regional Water Quality Control Board; Santa Ana Regional Water Quality Control Board; and San Diego Regional Water Quality Control Board) and the largest southern California stormwater management agencies added in 2003 (Ventura County Watershed Protection District, Los Angeles County Flood Control District, Orange County Public Works, and County of San Diego). The most recent addition was the California Ocean Protection Council, which was added in 2007 to enhance interactions with the California Resources Agency.

== See also ==
- California State Water Resources Control Board
- CalEPA
- Chemical dumps in ocean off Southern California
