= Groundwater Ambient Monitoring and Assessment Program =

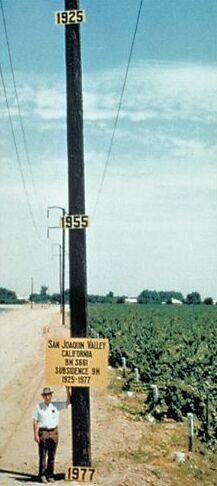
Land Subsidence in the San Joaquin Valley, CA

The Groundwater Ambient Monitoring and Assessment Program (GAMA) is an all-inclusive monitoring program for groundwater that was implemented in 2000 in California, United States. It was created by the California State Water Resources Control Board as an improvement from groundwater programs that were already in place.

GAMA monitors various aspects in groundwater such as the water quality and allotment total through research projects conducted by multiple agencies both statewide and locally sourced. GAMA wants to improve public awareness for groundwater resources as well as improve monitoring on groundwater research across the state to assess potential hazards from this resource.

== California groundwater ==
Approximately 85% of water used in California by farmers and residents today is from groundwater, with 6 million Californians relying solely on this resource. The Central Valley is a big user of groundwater for agricultural purposes which supplies a large portion of food for not only California, but for the rest of the United States as well. This resource for a long time had been unregulated, which helps one understand the groundwater crisis that occurs today in California. This was a highly relied upon resource over the past century, and was especially critical during drought periods. When there was less snow pack and less precipitation, people relied heavily on groundwater. Over time, issues have arisen like land subsidence which occurs from pumping groundwater out faster than it can naturally replenish underground. This is one reason among many others for why GAMA was proposed.

== Research projects ==
Unconfined aquifer referring to a shallow aquifer. Confined aquifer referring to a deep aquifer.

Since GAMA has been implemented, there have been a few projects that GAMA aims to achieve to better understand California's groundwater systems.

=== Priority Basin Project ===
Begun in 2002 to help better understand risks imposed on California groundwater, this project looks at both deep and shallow aquifers. Deep groundwater for this project looks at how this water is used for the public use. Shallow aquifers address more local water uses such as wells. By tracking both of these aquifers, officials hope to be able to better understand impacts on groundwater, to provide more information to consumers.

=== GeoTracker GAMA ===
This is a system that integrates reported data from all of Californias groundwater systems from both the Priority Basin Project and the Domestic Well Project. This information goes through analytical processes to later be uploaded onto a comprehensive statewide map. This monitoring method allows all agencies access to a comprehensive site where data is available for users to see if there is a potential contaminant that is above safety levels.

=== Domestic Well Project ===
This project took samples from domestic wells and analyzed the water quality for commonly occurring chemicals. This gave well owners information regarding the quality of their water, which also acted as a baseline for other wells in the area. This information was entered into the GeoTracker GAMA project data. There has been a main focus on six counties which include Tehama, Monterey, Yuba, El Dorado, Tulare, and San Diego counties. Over one thousand wells collectively between all counties have been sampled so far. Chemicals tested include Nitrates, Perchlorate, Sulfate, Chloride, Coliform, Volatile Organic Compounds, Aluminum, Arsenic, Cadmium, Chromium, Iron, Lead, Manganese, Thallium, Vanadium, Zinc, Radium, and Uranium. Most owners received information by pamphlets sent by mail regarding the water quality of their well.

=== The Arrowhead Tunnels Project ===
The Arrowhead Tunnels Project shares a portion and is regulated under the Metropolitan Water District (MWD). MWD was issued a Special Use Permit to the San Bernardino National Forest. The Special Uses Permit allows other multi-disciplinary services and agencies to evaluate techniques of construction, hydrology, groundwater dependent systems, impacts on groundwater storage, and how groundwater is recovered. A case study done by The San Bernardino National Forest developed a goal for a groundwater management project called the Arrowhead Tunnels project, in hopes to maintain the current health and vitality of the ecosystem. The project's protocol is to monitor and protect the amount of groundwater activity. The design includes two 16-ft tunnels that stretch over 8 miles and about 2,040 ft deep. The success of the project has been effective in terms of measuring base flow, ground water-dependent surface water, and the hydrological processes of the San Bernardino Mountain water table.

The main sources of Volatile Organic Compounds (VOC) described in 2005 from the EPA.

== Assessments and Findings ==
In 2003 the Department of Water Resources developed an analysis on 39 well water resources to trace toxic chemicals and pollutants. The collection of samples were monitored from local and regional areas of the Sacramento Valley including the Sacramento Basin and Volcanic Provinces such as Sierra Nevada and Chico, CA. The Volcanic Provinces contain the Vina and West Butte Basins which are interconnected with the large Sacramento Basin.

In 2003, the California Aquifer Susceptibility (CAS) project managed sources of contamination and assessed water quality for toxic traces of Volatile Organic Compounds (VOC). Volatile Organic Compounds form from human activity and naturally. The process includes an organic compound that undergoes evaporation and the remaining molecules are released into the water or the atmosphere from temperature changes. The assessment is used as a source towards prevention of current water supply to become contaminated.

Diagram of the Water Cycle and the anthropogenic influences impacting water recharge systems.

=== Pharmaceutical Pollutants ===
The years of 2004- 2005 Los Angeles Metropolitan area and neighboring basins in Southern and Central California have completed GAMA assessments on water quality which assesses for public drinking-water supply and overall quality of groundwater tables. The flow rates in groundwater supply are deprived by surface, recharge systems from storms, waste and sewage water treatment systems. The assessment discovered traces of pharmaceuticals of human and non-human material being disposed in the groundwater recharge supply. Pharmaceutical toxic chemicals reported were pesticides, insecticides, caffeine, and various other toxic chemicals. There is a connection that the repeated concentration rates in pharmaceuticals found in the water supply was anthropogenic. There was limited use on land-owned wells because of the potential risk of the recharge water supply which could have been affected by the pharmaceutical traces. The pesticides and insecticide chemicals are driven by human activity, including agricultural practices and irrigation runoff. The pesticides and insecticide chemicals are said to be driven by human activity, including agricultural practices and irrigation runoff. There is a large indication that there will be a large risk in Los Angeles groundwater supply in the future. Los Angeles is the largest urbanized region in California and increased potential risk factors from pharmaceutical and toxic concentrations on drinking water supply are arising for the City of Los Angeles. The GAMA assessment collects data that is useful for monitoring and protecting future groundwater and drinking water supply. The GAMA Program is useful for tracing toxic pollutants and chemicals that can have harmful effects on human health.

== Legislation ==
GAMA was built on current legislation which consists of six bills and one proposition.

=== The 1999 Budget Act ===
The 1999 Budget Act was the development plan and framework which instructed the members of the California State Water Resources Control Board to begin establishing the Groundwater Ambient Monitoring and Assessment Program (GAMA Program). The purpose of the GAMA program is to demonstrate and measure environmental vulnerability and particle concentrations of pollutants in groundwater tables. Various GAMA Assessment reports in Northern California include the state capital of Sacramento on the basis of public safety and water quality. The reports have made contributions from a document called the Supplemental Report of the 1999 Budget Act.

=== AB 599: Groundwater Quality Monitoring Act ===
Took effect in 2001 shortly after GAMA was implemented. Legislature stated that it's a necessity that groundwater should continue to be monitored to make sure the groundwater system is safe. More information to the public needs to be improved upon, and more information needs to be conducted to better understand how to restore depleted groundwater systems. A comprehensive program among agencies would need to be implemented across the state to ensure adequate monitoring measures.

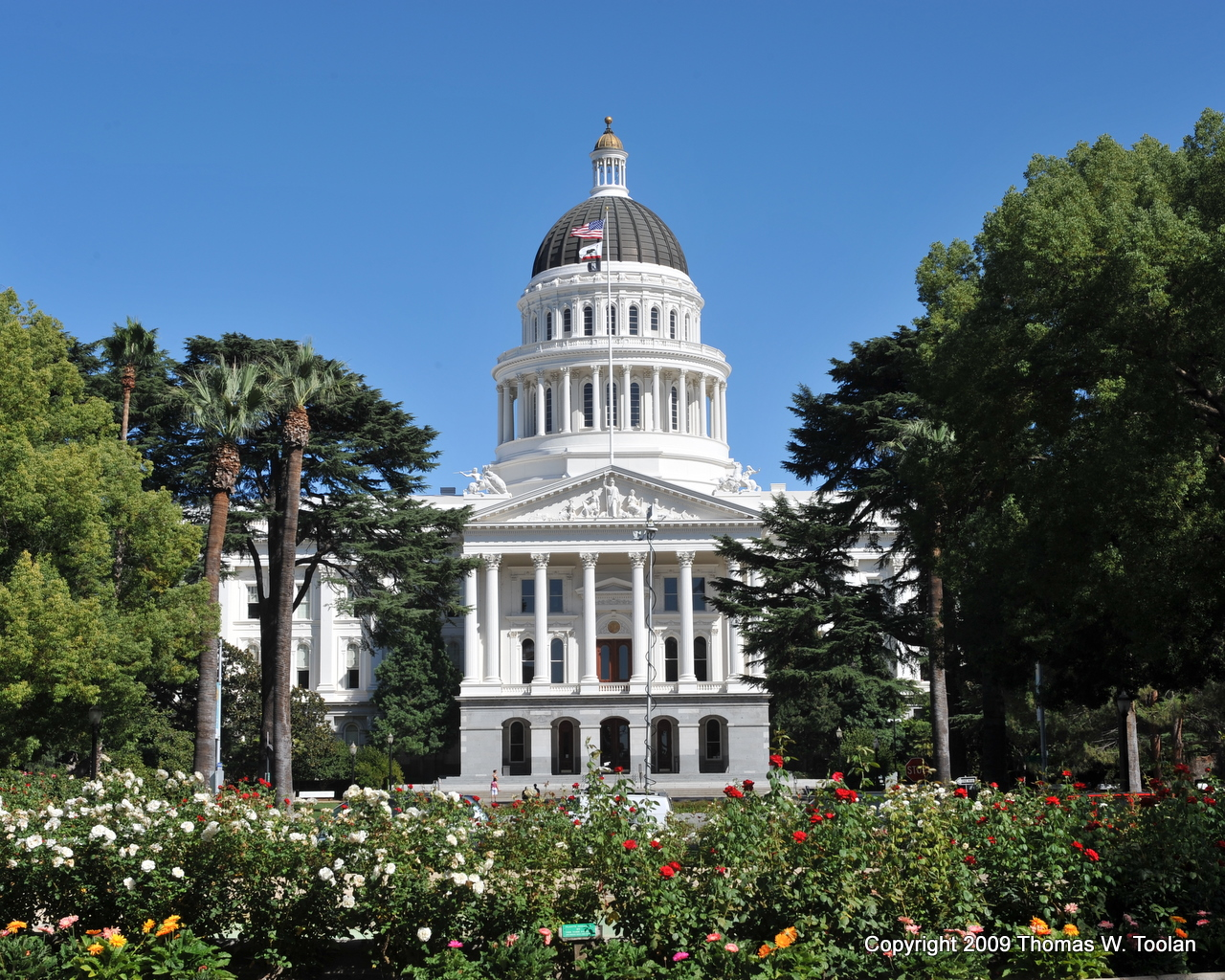
California State Capitol. California citizens vote prop 50 (water scarcity, Clean Drinking Water, Coastal and Beach Protection Act)

=== Prop 50: Water Scarcity, Clean Drinking Water, Coastal and Beach Protection Act ===
Passed in November 2002. This Act was granted approximately $380 million for IRWM plans and projects. Voters approved this act which would help with a number of issues such as groundwater replenishment plans, improved water quality, and improved water security.

=== AB1747: Bond Law for Proposition 50 Projects ===
States that rules from Proposition 50 must be in line with AB 599.

=== AB 2222: Groundwater Information Accessibility and Identification of Communities Reliant on Contaminated Groundwater ===
This bill states that the state board extend AB 599 funding to 2024. Public opinion would be able to make recommendations and state opinions before new legislation would be enacted. Public accessibility would be improved upon as well regarding issues such as contaminated groundwater, and developing plans to assess the situation.

=== SB X2 1: Nitrate Pilot Projects in Tulare Lake and Salinas Basins ===
Implemented in 2008 as a recovery program to understand why contamination can occur in groundwater and preventative measures. Tulare lake and Salinas basin will serve as a research zones. Agencies will find point sources of nitrates in groundwater, and reduce nitrate levels or prevent them entirely. Costs and funding methods must be interpreted for these zones. Adding an interagency task force to monitor and expand cleanup programs will be a necessity, and reports must be generated including all research conducted from Tulare Lake and the Salinas Basin.

=== SB1938: Monitoring Components for Groundwater Managing Plans ===
A local agency can come up with a new plan for groundwater management based on prior groundwater laws. SB 1938 declared that groundwater must be protected and adequately managed, especially during dry years where groundwater use increases. This bill continues to declare that groundwater systems are not well understood which complicates future planning, and that agencies need to communicate with each other to effectively manage a monitoring system for this resource.

=== SB 4: Oil and Gas: Well Stimulation ===
Implemented in 2013. Well Stimulation Treatments would need an all-inclusive program to monitor these actions. Part of this bill enacted research on well stimulation treatments which owners or well operators would be required to have recorded data on these sites. Permits would be required to perform any well stimulation treatments as well as frequent inspections. Fines will be issued if violations occur. This program must be implemented starting in July, 2015.
