= Gulf of Santa Catalina =

Gulf in the Pacific Ocean

Coordinates: 33°00′N 118°00′W

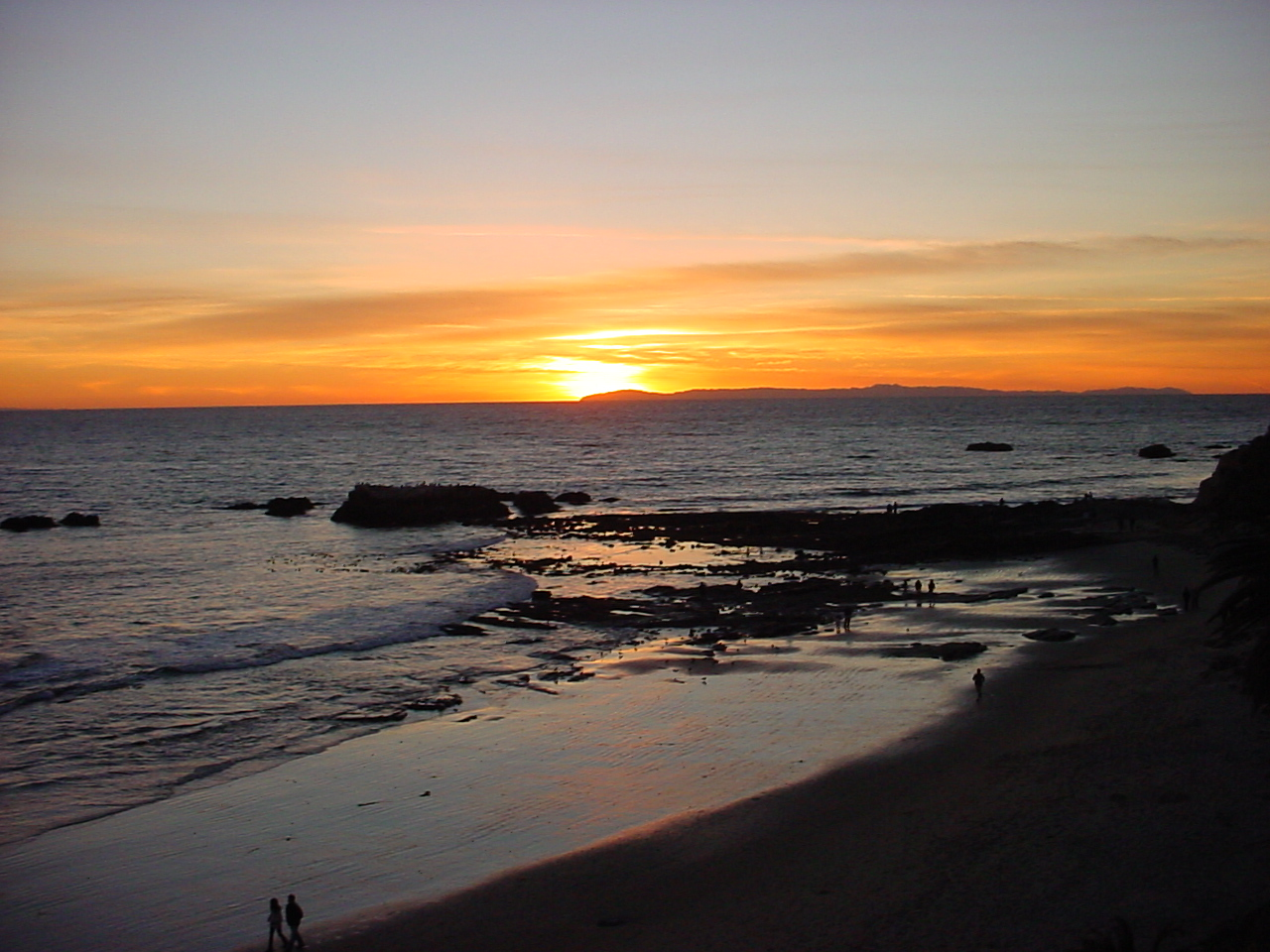
The Gulf of Santa Catalina in Laguna Beach at sunset

The Gulf of Santa Catalina, also the Gulf of Catalina, is a gulf in the Pacific Ocean on the West Coast of the United States and part of the larger Southern California Bight. The eastern coast of the gulf belongs to the states of California, United States, and Baja California, Mexico. The largest town on the shore of the gulf is San Diego. The islands in the gulf include Santa Catalina Island. The gulf covers an area of more than 100 sq mi (260 km^{2}) and borders the east coast of Catalina and the beaches of Orange, Los Angeles, and San Diego counties.

The gulf is located in a seismically active area.

== History ==
The gulf was first navigated by European discoverers in 1542, when Juan Rodríguez Cabrillo sailed there from Navidad on the San Salvador and two other ships.
