= Five elements =

Five elements may refer to:

== Philosophy ==
- Classical elements
- Godai (Japanese philosophy)
- Gogyo, five phase Japanese philosophy
- Wuxing (Chinese philosophy), ancient Chinese theory involving five 'phases', 'agents', or 'elements'
- Mahābhūta, the five elements in Indian philosophy
- Pancha Tattva (Vaishnavism)

== Science ==
- Boron, element 5 in the periodic table
- Group 5 element, elements in the fifth column of the periodic table
- Period 5 element, elements in the fifth row of the periodic table

== Music ==
- Five Elements, a band led by jazz musician Steve Coleman

== See also ==
- Element (disambiguation)
- Fifth Element (disambiguation)
