= Elementals (comics) =

In comics, Elementals may refer to:

- Elementals (Comico Comics), a superhero comic book by Bill Willingham
- Elementals (Marvel Comics), a group of four immortals in the Marvel Universe

It may also refer to:

- Element Girl
- Element Lad

== See also ==
- Elemental (disambiguation)
