= Elementy =

Russian political magazine (1992–2000)

- Editor: Aleksandr Dugin
- Categories: Political magazine
- Frequency: Biannual; Annual
- Founder: Aleksandr Dugin
- Founded: 1992
- Final issue: 2000
- Country: Russia
- Based in: Moscow
- Language: Russian

Elementy (Russian: Elements) was a political magazine which was started and published by Russian political philosopher Aleksandr Dugin. Its subtitle was Evraziiskoe Obozrenie (Russian: Euroasian Review). It existed between 1992 and 2000 and was the mouthpiece of neo-Eurasianism in Russia.

== History and profile ==
Elementy was launched by Aleksandr Dugin in 1992. It was modeled on French new right publication Éléments. Dugin himself described it as the Russian spin off of Éléments which also had Italian and German versions, Elementi and Elemente, respectively. Alain de Benoist, French journalist, briefly served as a board member of Elementy in 1992, but resigned from the post due his disagreement with Dugin.

Elementy was started as a biannual publication, but later it came out annually. Dugin edited it between 1992 and 1998. The magazine covered articles on Eurasianism, philosophy, occultism, and religion. The first issue featured articles by the Russian generals who were heading various departments at the Academy of the General Staff. It attempted to clear the way for the acceptance of the traditionalism by Russians. The magazine had a circulation of 5,000-10,000 copies.

Elementy folded in 2000.
