= Éléments =

French bi-monthly magazine

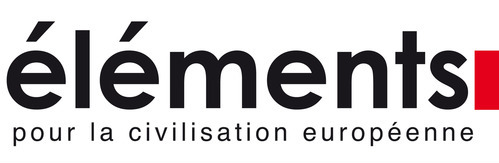
- Editor: Robert de Herte
- Categories: Idea magazine
- Frequency: Bi-monthly
- Founded: 1973
- Country: France
- Based in: Paris
- Language: French
- Website: revue-elements.com
- ISSN: 1251-8441

Éléments (French pronunciation: [elemɑ̃]) is a French bi-monthly magazine launched in September 1973 and associated with the Nouvelle Droite. It is published by the ethnonationalist think tank GRECE.

== History ==
Initially serving as the internal bulletin of GRECE, an ethno-nationalist think tank led by Alain de Benoist, the magazine began its public circulation in September 1973 as the general public showcase of the organization. Michel Marmin became its first president, followed by Pierre Vial in 1983, then by Jean-Claude Bardet. In 1991, Charles Champetier, then aged 24, became the magazine's president.

In 2017 the web television TV Libertés started to broadcast Le Plus d'Élements, a talk show hosted by Olivier François in collaboration with Éléments.

Following the murder of Darya Dugina in August 2022, Éléments posted a tribute to Dugina which compared her to Salman Rushdie and also referred to Ukrainian president Volodymyr Zelenskyy, during his country's invasion by Russia, as a "clown in a khaki t-shirt" (French: le clown au tee-shirt kaki).

== Audience ==
In the early 1990s, Éléments had around 5,000 subscribers, mainly from the well-educated elites, along with an audience of university students. A 1993 poll revealed that 35 per cent of the magazine's subscribers were politically close to the Front National.

According to scholar Tamir Bar-On, "Éléments generally appeals to GRECE's younger, more militant audience. Éléments might also be more populist and nationalist than the more aristocratic Nouvelle École", another magazine launched by GRECE in 1968.

== Spin offs ==
There have been several editions of Éléments. The Russian version, Elementy, was launched by Aleksandr Dugin and published between 1992 and 2000. It also had Italian and German version, Elementi and Elemente, respectively.
