= California State Water Resources Control Board =

Branch of the California Environmental Protection Agency

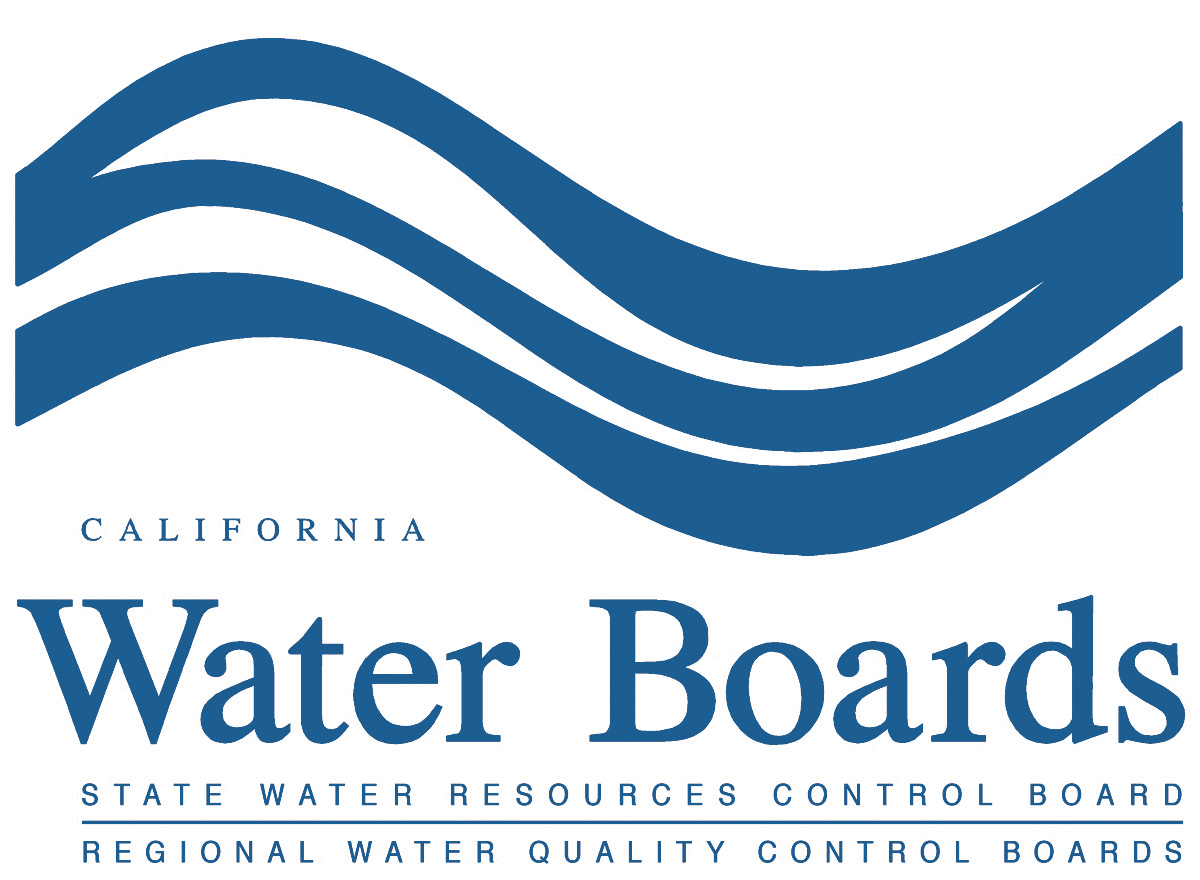
Logo of the California State Water Resources Control Board.

The California State Water Resources Control Board (SWRCB) is one of six branches of the California Environmental Protection Agency.

== History ==
This regulatory program has had the status of an official government department since the 1950s. The State Water Pollution Control Board, as well as 9 regional boards, were established by the Dickey Water Pollution Act of 1949. The board was renamed to the State Water Quality Control Board by an Act of 1963. The State Water Resources Control Board was established from the State Water Quality Control Board and the State Water Rights Board by an Act of 1967.

California's pioneering clean water act is the 1969 Porter-Cologne Water Quality Control Act (Porter-Cologne Act). Through the Porter-Cologne Act, the State Water Board and the Regional Water Boards have been entrusted with broad duties and powers to preserve and enhance all beneficial uses of the state's immensely complex waterscape. The Porter-Cologne Act is recognized as one of the nation's strongest pieces of anti-pollution legislation, and was so influential that Congressional authors used sections of the Act as the basis for the Federal Clean Water Act.

== Authority and responsibilities ==
The late SWRCB chairman, Don Maughan, wrote:

The State Water Board has never had the luxury of advocating protection of just one water need, such as the environment or agriculture or that of large cities. Our charge is to balance all water needs of the state. Some call it a superhuman task, but through the years this Board, aided by its excellent staff, has done what I call a superhuman job of accomplishing that mandate despite the intensive historical, political, and economic pressures that always accompany California water issues.

The State Water Board oversees the allocation of the state's water resources to various entities and for diverse uses, from agricultural irrigation to hydro electrical power generation to municipal water supplies, and for safeguarding the cleanliness and purity of Californians' water for everything from bubble baths to trout streams to ocean beaches.

The State Water Board is separate from and has different responsibilities than the California Department of Water Resources (DWR), which manages state-owned water infrastructure, such as dams, reservoirs and aqueducts. DWR, like any other water user, must apply for water rights permits from the State Water Board.

Under the Federal Clean Water Act and the state's pioneering Porter-Cologne Water Quality Control Act the State Water Board has regulatory authority for protecting the water quality of nearly 1,600,000 acres (6,500 km^{2}) of lakes, 1,300,000 acres (5,300 km^{2}) of bays and estuaries, 211,000 miles (340,000 km) of rivers and streams, and about 1,100 miles (1,800 km) of exquisite California coastline.

The State Water Board also provides financial assistance to local governments and non-profit agencies to help build or rejuvenate wastewater treatment plants, and protect, restore and monitor water quality, wetlands, and estuaries. It also administers a fund to help underground storage tank owners and operators pay for the costs of cleaning up leaking underground storage tanks.

The State Water Board coordinates the state's nine Regional Water Quality Control Boards (Regional Water Boards), which serve as the frontline for state and federal water pollution control efforts. Together, the State Water Board and the nine Regional Water Boards are referred to as the California Water Boards.

== Operations ==
=== Water Quality ===
The Water Quality Division of the State Water Board develops statewide water protection plans and establishes water quality standards like the California Bays and Estuaries Policy. The Division has two branches: a surface water branch and a groundwater branch. The surface water branch focuses on monitoring and regulating storm water discharges and wastewater (sewage) treatment. It also monitors surface water quality, oversees protection of wetlands and the ocean, is active in environmental education and environmental justice issues, identifies and oversees clean-up of contaminated sites, and promotes low-impact development (LID). The groundwater branch provides statewide guidance and oversight for discharges to land and cleanup of sites with contaminated groundwater.

=== Water Rights ===
The Water Rights Division of the State Water Board allocates surface water rights based on the state's extremely complex system of water rights laws, and assists Board members in exercising the Board's judicial power in water rights disputes. The State Water Board is solely responsible for issuing permits for water rights, specifying amounts, conditions, and construction timetables for diversion and storage. Decisions about water rights are based on such factors as water availability, historical water rights, and flows needed to preserve in-stream uses, such as recreation and fish habitat.

California recognizes several different types of rights to take and use surface water. Some water rights can only be held by government. These include pueblo rights, which can only be held by municipalities that were originally Mexican or Spanish pueblos, and federal reserved rights, which can only be held by the federal government.

==== Groundwater ====
For the purpose of administering water rights, California categorizes groundwater as either a subterranean stream flowing through a known and definite channel or percolating groundwater. Groundwater that is a subterranean stream is subject to the same water right permitting requirements as surface water. California has no statewide water right permit process for regulating the use of percolating groundwater. A subterranean stream meets the following four characteristics: (1) A subsurface channel must be present; (2) The channel must have relatively impermeable bed and banks; (3) The course of the channel must be known or capable of being determined by reasonable inference; and (4) Groundwater must be flowing in the channel.

In most areas of the state, landowners whose property overlies percolating groundwater may pump it for beneficial use without approval from the State Water Board or a court. In several basins, however, groundwater use is regulated in accordance with court decrees. Further, in Ventura, Los Angeles, San Bernardino, and Riverside counties, groundwater pumpers are required to report their groundwater extraction amounts to either the State Water Board or a local groundwater management agency.

=== Laws and Regulations ===
The State Water Board and the Regional Water Boards are responsible for swift and fair enforcement when the laws and regulations protecting California's waterways are violated. The State Water Board's Office of Enforcement assists and coordinates enforcement activities statewide.

Enforcement serves many purposes. First and foremost, it assists in protecting the beneficial uses of waters of the State. Swift and firm enforcement can prevent pollution from occurring and can promote prompt cleanup and correction of existing pollution problems. Enforcement ensures compliance with requirements in State Water Board and Regional Water Board regulations, plans, policies, and orders. Enforcement not only protects the public health and the environment, but also creates an "even playing field," ensuring that dischargers who comply with the law are not placed at a competitive disadvantage by those who do not. It also deters potential violators and, thus, further protects the environment. Monetary remedies provide a measure of compensation for the damage that pollution causes to the environment and ensure that polluters do not gain an economic advantage from violations of water quality laws.

In 2017, The State Water Board revised its water quality enforcement policy with the goal of creating an enforcement system that addresses water quality problems in the most efficient, effective, and consistent manner.

=== Financial Assistance ===
The State Water Board's Division of Financial Assistance (DFA) has a number of programs designed to help local agencies and individuals prevent or clean up water pollution. The DFA provides loans and grants for constructing municipal sewage and water recycling facilities, remediation for underground storage tank releases, watershed protection projects, and for nonpoint source pollution control projects. (Nonpoint source pollution usually involves contaminants flowing into a body of water from diffuse sources such as runoff from storm water, which may contain road dirt or fertilizers and pesticides from lawns, as well as water that collects debris from construction sites and fecal matter from barnyards and flows into nearby rivers, streams and lakes.)

The DFA has allocated about 4 billion dollars for the construction of sewage treatment plants in communities throughout the state through the Clean Water State Revolving Fund (SRF) program. Also, a billion and a half dollars in bond funds have gone to communities for water quality protection, including water quality planning, treatment of storm water and clean beaches since 2000.

DFA also administers the American Recovery and Reinvestment Act (ARRI) funds through the State Revolving Fund. The money awarded is in the form of grants and ultra-low interest zero and one-percent loans for projects that include wastewater treatment plant construction, upgrade and infrastructure improvements as well as "green" projects such as wastewater recycling. Under the 2009 stimulus program, the State Water Board handled $270.5 million in addition to more than $300 million normally loaned by the SRF each year.

=== Membership ===
State Water Board members are appointed to four-year terms by the governor and are confirmed by the State Senate. Each salaried member fills a different specialty position. These represent engineering expertise, water quality expertise, public interest, and water supply.

As of June 30, 2021 the members are E. Joaquin Esquivel (chair), Dorene D'Adamo (Vice Chair), Sean Maguire, Laurel Firestone, and Nichole Morgan.

As of June 30, 2021 E. Joaquin Esquivel is the Board Chair. Esquivel was born and raised in California's Coachella Valley, the son of educators and grandson of farm workers. He holds a Bachelor of Arts in English from U.C. Santa Barbara. He worked for eight and a half years in the Washington D. C. office of California's U.S. Senator Barbara Boxer. He started as an intern, leaving as Senator Boxer's Legislative Assistant. His portfolios for Senator Boxer covered agriculture, Native Americans, water, oceans, and nutrition. He was also Director of Information and Technology. In July 2015 he was appointed to the California Natural Resources Agency where he also served in the Washington D. C. office of Governor Edmund G. Brown Jr. as Assistant Secretary for Federal Water Policy. There, he co-ordinated the interests of that agency and its departments with those of the Governor's Office, the California Congressional delegation and federal stakeholder agencies. Governor Brown appointed him to the State Water Resources Control Board in March 2017.

As of June 30, 2021 Dorene D'Adamo is the board Vice Chair. D'Adamo was appointed to the board by Governor Brown in 2013. She previously served on the California Air Resources Board from 1999 to 2013 under the Brown, Schwarzenegger and Davis Administrations, where she was instrumental in the board's air quality and climate change programs and regulations.

Sean Maguire previously worked as manager in the Division of Water Rights, overseeing administration of water right change petitions, licensing, and cannabis cultivation permitting. From 2003 to 2015, Maguire worked for an engineering consulting firm. He was appointed in 2018.

Laurel Firestone is a co-founder of the Community Water Center, a statewide nonprofit. She served on the Tulare County Water Commission from 2007 to 2012, and was appointed to the board in February 2019.

Nichole Morgan served as an Assistant Deputy Director in the State Water Resources Control Board’s Division of Financial Assistance. She worked in various capacities on the staff of the board, starting in 2009, and was appointed as the board's Civil Engineer in June, 2021.

== Failing water systems ==
In July 2014, the California Department of Public Health passed down administration of the state’s Drinking Water Program to the State Water Board. The California State Water Resources Control Board oversees approximately 7,400 water systems. Each year, the SWRCB documents harmful health-based violations in approximately 7% of their community water systems. In their 2024 Drinking Water Needs Assessment, the State Water Board’s failing criteria identified 385 failing public water systems. Under their criteria, these water systems failed to meet safe standards either on groundwater contamination, outdated regulatory compliance, technical capacity, financial magnitude, or managerial scope. These public water systems provide drinking water to more than 900,000 California residents. A 2019 report found cancer-causing contaminants such as 1,2,3-TCP in roughly 495 public water systems in California. A 2023 public health journal found that groundwater and small water systems contain the commonly found contaminants uranium, arsenic, and nitrate; which if consumed in larger quantities than outlined in the US Environmental Protection Agency (EPA) criteria, pose health detriments.

== Environmental racism ==
Water system failures, health-based violations, and increased non-compliance are most commonly found in low-income, communities of color. A state auditor's report identified over two thirds of California's defected water systems in economically challenged districts. Research finds that marginalized groups such as Hispanics, Asian Americans, African-Americans and individuals residing in California Tribal Nations have increased chance of being exposed to unsafe and unregulated drinking water. The San Joaquin Valley for example hosts one third of California's failing water systems, and supplies water to one third of the state's residents with high poverty rates. Federally recognized Tribal water systems included in the SWRCB' SAFER Drinking Program face data insufficiency for at-risk water system assessment. In September 2022, the California State Water Resources Control Board added Assembly Bill 2108 to their Water Code to help eliminate these disparities. The bill's goals are equitable and reinforced measures for Tribal nations and low-resourced communities affected by disproportionate water quality violations. However, Tribal nations, African Americans, Latinos, and Asian Americans have filed racial discrimination complaints and expressed public dissent over the SWRCB's alleged failure to protect these communities against pollutants in water systems. Tribal nations and minority groups have also accused the California State Water Resources Control Board of exclusion from public participation and policy-making. In March, Latino community members from the Central Coast filed a racial discrimination complaint over disparate levels of nitrate being found in groundwater serving Latino residencies.

== Regional Water Quality Control Boards ==
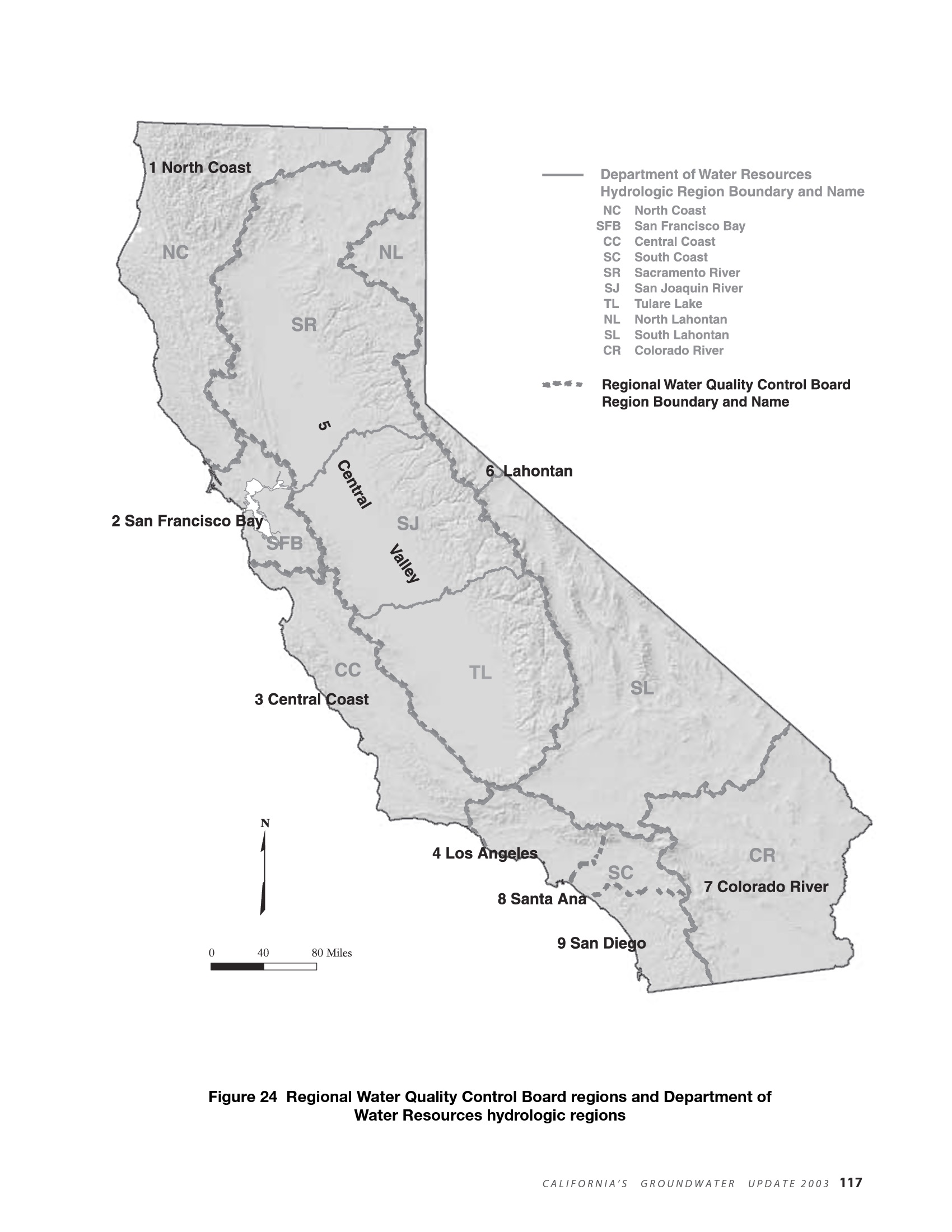
Map of Regiobal Water Quality Control Boards from California state bulletin 118

The nine semi-autonomous Regional Water Boards were created in 1949 by the Dickey Water Pollution Act and have been responsible for protecting the surface, ground and coastal waters of their regions since then.

In adopting the Dickey Act the Legislature was acknowledging that California's water pollution problems are regional, and are affected by rain and snowfall, the configuration of the land, and population density, as well as recreational, agricultural, urban and industrial development, all of which vary from region to region.

The Regional Water Boards develop basin plans for their natural geographic characteristics that affect the overland flow of water in their area, govern requirements for and issue waste discharge permits, take enforcement action against dischargers who violate permits or otherwise harm water quality in surface waters, and monitor water quality.

The Regional Water Boards are unusual in this state because their boundaries follow natural mountain chains and ridges that define watersheds rather than political boundaries.

The 9 Regional Water Quality Control Boards are the:

1. North Coast RWQCB - rivers draining to the Pacific Ocean between the Oregon border and Tomales Bay
2. San Francisco Bay RWQCB - rivers draining to San Francisco Bay (except the Sacramento and San Joaquin Rivers) and to the Pacific Ocean from Tomales Bay south to Pescadero Creek.
3. Central Coast RWQCB - rivers draining to the Pacific Ocean from Pescadero Point south through Santa Barbara County.
4. Los Angeles RWQCB - rivers draining to the Pacific Ocean in Ventura and Los Angeles Counties.
5. Central Valley RWQCB - the Sacramento and San Joaquin Rivers and their tributaries.
6. Lahontan RWQCB - rivers draining into the Great Basin.
7. Colorado River Basin RWQCB - the Colorado River and tributaries.
8. Santa Ana RWQCB - rivers draining to the Pacific Ocean from Huntington Beach south to Newport Beach.
9. San Diego RWQCB - rivers draining to the Pacific Ocean from Laguna Beach south to the border with Baja California, Mexico.

=== Reports and portals ===
Performance report

The Water Boards released a first-of-its-kind Performance Report in 2009 describing the performance of the State and Regional Water Boards in protecting California's waters through implementation of existing water quality and water rights laws.

Along with the Performance Report, the Water Boards led the State's Water Quality Monitoring Council's effort to launch a coordinated, statewide web portal named "My water quality" that communicates the actual quality of California's waters. These tools are being continuously improved and will soon describe actual targets for environmental improvement over the coming years.

In 2014, during the drought, 28 small California communities cycled onto and off of a list of "critical water systems" that the Board had determined could run dry within 60 days.

== See also ==
- CAL EPA
- Groundwater Ambient Monitoring and Assessment Program
- Native American Rights
- Southern California Coastal Water Research Project
- U.S. Bureau of Land Management
- United States Bureau of Reclamation
- Category: Water in California
