= Element (category theory) =

Generalized concept of a set element

In category theory, the concept of an element, or a point, generalizes the more usual set theoretic concept of an element of a set to an object of any category. This idea often allows restating of definitions or properties of morphisms (such as monomorphism or product) given by a universal property in more familiar terms, by stating their relation to elements. Some very general theorems, such as Yoneda's lemma and the Mitchell embedding theorem, are of great utility for this, by allowing one to work in a context where these translations are valid. This approach to category theory – in particular the use of the Yoneda lemma in this way – is due to Grothendieck, and is often called the method of the functor of points.

== Definition ==
Suppose C is any category and A, T are two objects of C. A T-valued point of A is simply a morphism p : T → A. The set of all T-valued points of A varies functorially with T, giving rise to the "functor of points" of A; according to the Yoneda lemma, this completely determines A as an object of C.

== Properties of morphisms ==
Many properties of morphisms can be restated in terms of points. For example, a map f is said to be a monomorphism if

For all maps g, h, if f ∘ g = f ∘ h then g = h.

Suppose f : B → C and g, h : A → B in C. Then g and h are A-valued points of B, and therefore monomorphism is equivalent to the more familiar statement

f is a monomorphism if it is an injective function on points of B.

Some care is necessary. f is an epimorphism if the dual condition holds:

For all maps g, h (of some suitable type), g ∘ f = h ∘ f implies g = h.

In set theory, the term "epimorphism" is synonymous with "surjection", i.e.

Every point of C is the image, under f, of some point of B.

This is clearly not the translation of the first statement into the language of points, and in fact these statements are not equivalent in general. However, in some contexts, such as abelian categories, "monomorphism" and "epimorphism" are backed by sufficiently strong conditions that in fact they do allow such a reinterpretation on points.

Similarly, categorical constructions such as the product have pointed analogues. Recall that if A, B are two objects of C, their product A × B is an object such that

There exist maps p : A × B → A, q : A × B → B, and for any T and maps f : T → A, g : T → B, there exists a unique map h : T → A × B such that f = p ∘ h and g = q ∘ h.

In this definition, f and g are T-valued points of A and B, respectively, while h is a T-valued point of A × B. An alternative definition of the product is therefore:

A × B is an object of C, together with projection maps p : A × B → A and q : A × B → B, such that p and q furnish a bijection between points of A × B and pairs of points of A and B.

This is the more familiar definition of the product of two sets.

== Geometric origin ==
The terminology is geometric in origin; in algebraic geometry, Grothendieck introduced the notion of a scheme in order to unify the subject with arithmetic geometry, which dealt with the same idea of studying solutions to polynomial equations (i.e. algebraic varieties) but where the solutions are not complex numbers but rational numbers, integers, or even elements of some finite field. A scheme is then just that: a scheme for collecting together all the manifestations of a variety defined by the same equations but with solutions taken in different number sets. One scheme gives a complex variety, whose points are its (Spec C)-valued points, as well as the set of (Spec Q)-valued points (rational solutions to the equations), and even (Spec F_{p})-valued points (solutions modulo p).

One feature of the language of points is evident from this example: it is, in general, not enough to consider just points with values in a single object. For example, the equation x^{2} + 1 = 0 (which defines a scheme) has no real solutions, but it has complex solutions, namely ±i. It also has one solution modulo 2 and two modulo 5, 13, 29, etc. (all primes that are 1 modulo 4). Just taking the real solutions would give no information whatsoever.

== Relation with set theory ==
The situation is analogous to the case where C is the category Set, of sets of actual elements. In this case, we have the "one-pointed" set {1}, and the elements of any set S are the same as the {1}-valued points of S. In addition, though, there are the {1, 2}-valued points, which are pairs of elements of S, or elements of S × S. In the context of sets, these higher points are extraneous: S is determined completely by its {1}-points. However, as shown above, this is special (in this case, it is because all sets are iterated coproducts of {1}).
