= Element (sports) =

Distinct component of a performance with an assessed degree of difficulty

In sport, an element, skill, or trick is a distinct component of a performance with an assessed degree of difficulty. Skills may be performed in combination, increasing the measure of difficulty and thus the potential score. Some sports require athletes to demonstrate a minimum set of skills during a routine, and apply scoring penalties for failing to meet this minimum.

Sports with judged elements include bicycle motocross, diving, gymnastics, trampolining, skateboarding, skiing, and snowboarding.
