= David Valentine (scientist) =

American earth scientist

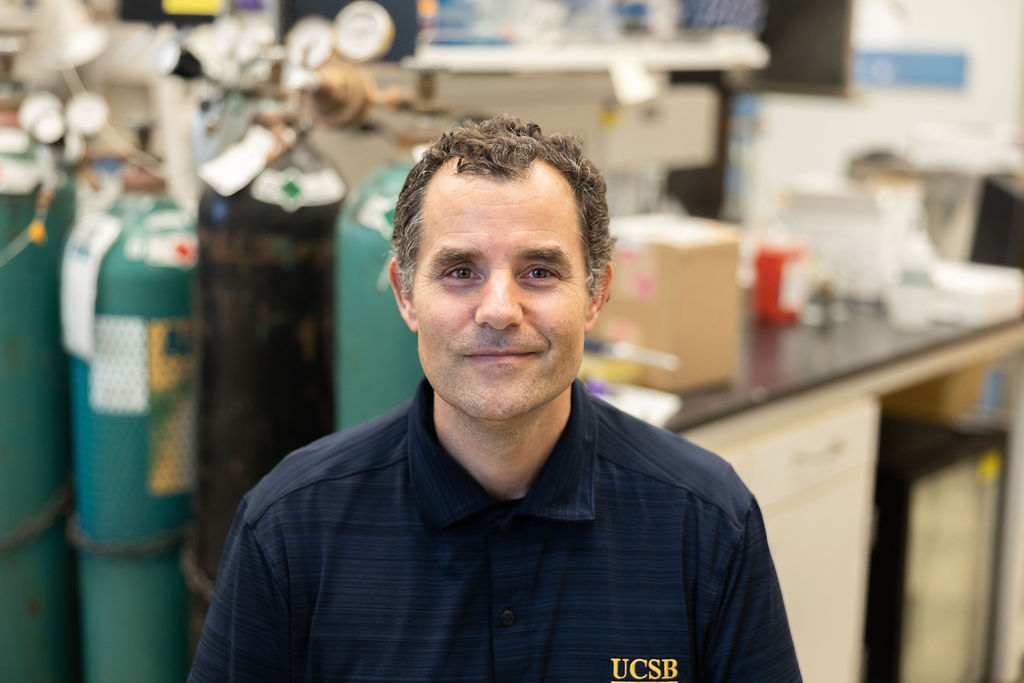
- Valentine in 2025
- Born: David Layton Valentine; 1973 (age 52–53); San Diego, California, United States
- Known for: His research on microbial geochemistry of hydrocarbons; response to the Deepwater Horizon spill; discovery of deep ocean DDT dumping;
- Title: Norris Presidential Endowed Chair in Earth Science and Distinguished Professor
- Awards: Fellow of the American Association for the Advancement of Science; Fellow of the Aldo Leopold Leadership Program

Academic background
- Education: B.S. Biochemistry/Chemistry, M.S. Chemistry, M.S. & Ph.D. Earth System Science
- Alma mater: University of California, San Diego, University of California, Irvine
- Thesis: Biogeochemistry of hydrogen and methane in anoxic environments : thermodynamic and isotopic studies (2000)
- Doctoral advisor: William S. Reeburgh
- Other advisors: Susan E. Trumbore, Ralph Cicerone, Gordon J.F. MacDonald, Bess Ward, Miriam Kastner

Academic work
- Discipline: Geochemistry, microbiology
- Sub-discipline: Marine microbiology, biogeochemistry
- Institutions: University of California, Santa Barbara
- Scientific career
- Education: University of California, San Diego, University of California, Irvine
- Fields: Geochemistry, microbiology
- Workplaces: University of California, Santa Barbara

David Layton Valentine (born 1973) is a geochemist, microbiologist and science communicator. He is a Distinguished Professor of Geochemistry and Microbiology in the Department of Earth Science at the University of California, Santa Barbara (UCSB), where he holds the Norris Presidential Chair. At UCSB, he directs the Valentine Lab.

== Early life and education ==
Valentine was born in San Diego, California in 1973 to two scientists and grew up in Davis, California. His father, Raymond C. Valentine (1936–2023), was a professor, at UC Davis and scientific founder of Calgene Inc., an early plant biotechnology company known for the development of RoundUp resistant crop plants and the Flavr Savr tomato among others products.

Valentine graduated from Davis Senior High School in 1991 after studying concurrently at UC Davis during his senior year. He then studied Biochemistry and Chemistry at the University of California, San Diego (UCSD), obtaining a B.S. degree in December 1995 and an MS in June, 1996. During his time at UCSD he conducted research with Donald R. Helinski and with Gordon J. F. MacDonald. He also served as Commissioner of Academic Affairs for the Associated Students, for which he received an award for Amazing Service and Dedication, the plaque for which is shown as an Easter egg in the film Out of Plain Sight. He then studied Earth System Science at UC Irvine, receiving his PhD in 2000, where he worked under the supervision of William S. Reeburgh. His Ph.D. thesis was titled "Biogeochemistry of hydrogen and methane in anoxic environments: Thermodynamic and isotopic studies". Valentine received an NSF Postdoctoral Fellowship in Microbial Biology that same year to conduct research at Scripps Institution of Oceanography, working with Douglas Bartlett and Miriam Kastner.

== Career and research ==
Valentine was hired onto the faculty at UC Santa Barbara in July, 2001, at the age of 27. He was promoted to associate professor in 2006, and then professor in 2010, and distinguished professor in 2022. He served as chair of the Interdepartmental Graduate Program in Marine Science from 2021 to 2024, and has been the director of the Marine Science Major from 2018- and the vice chair of the UC Santa Barbara Academic Senate from 2024. He was awarded the Norris Presidential Endowed Chair in Earth Science in 2017.

At UC Santa Barbara he has also received more than 20 grants from the National Science Foundation, and serves as the Co-Principal Investigator for the $22m National Science Foundation Biofoundry for Exceptional and Extreme Fungi, Archaea and Bacteria (Ex-FAB) since 2024.

=== Research ===
Valentine's research is at the disciplinary interface of microbiology, geochemistry and oceanography with ties to bioengineering. He applies tools from molecular microbiology, oceanography and (isotope) geochemistry to study interactions between microbes, chemicals and their environment in mainly marine settings. Much of his early research was on methane, anaerobic microbes, petroleum weathering, and lipid membranes. He also investigates major disasters such as oil spills and DDT pollution both toward understanding the impacts but also as a basic science tool to understand how the ocean responds to chemical and physical changes. He often uses the phrase "discoveries from disasters" to highlight his approach. In speaking about his work on the microbial breakdown of pollutants conducted at Ex-FAB, Valentine said “We’ve got the ability to engineer capabilities that these organisms have evolved over time — to study them, understand them, and perhaps even apply nature’s remedies”.

In addition to this core research, Valentine's scientific work includes – with his collaborators – the discovery of deep sea features including asphalt volcanoes, a massive microbial ring in the Santa Barbara Channel, and the hot tub of despair in the Gulf of Mexico; diversity generating retroelements in archaea and archaeal viruses, the confirmation of a biological hydrocarbon cycle in the ocean, ash impacts to coastal ocean microbes from wildfire, and the development/application of an isotopic approach to determine nitrogen loss from aquatic ecosystems.

In addition to his own research, Valentine has also worked on translating research into policy and communicating science to broad audiences. He served on the National Academy of Sciences Committee on the Effects of Diluted Bitumen on the Environment: A Comparative Study resulting in a 2016 report entitled Spills of Diluted Bitumen from Pipelines: A Comparative Study of Environmental Fate, Effects, and Response. He also served on the National Academy of Sciences Committee on Evaluation of the Use of Chemical Dispersants in Oil Spill Response resulting in a 2020 report entitled The Use of Dispersants in Marine Oil Spill Response. Valentine also gave congressional testimony on the Orange County Oil Spill in 2021. His discoveries and efforts on the topic of industrial DDT waste disposal helped to form the basis for the Ocean Protection and DDT Reduction Act which was introduced to the US Congress in 2026.

Valentine has also spoken out about the impacts of federal cuts in science funding, referring to Trump administration proposals as "a full-scale assault on science". He later pointed out that “This model of long-term funding — stable, federal support — that’s what made us the research powerhouse we are today...that model is under threat right now.” In an LA Times Op/Ed about proposed cuts to overhead costs by the Trump administration he opined that "indirect costs support the deep bench of supporting characters and services that enable me, the scientist, to focus on discovery. Without those services, my research enterprise crumbles, and new discoveries with it." In regard to the proposed 2026 changes in uniform guidance proposed by the Trump administration Valentine stated “The changes they have proposed will create chaos for universities and scientists, make it very easy to cancel projects, and will replace the peer review decision process with a political appointee.” He added “I am concerned that the combination of budget cuts and political control will lead to hollowed-out scientific agencies that set aside discovery based on scientific merit and instead follow political whim”.

=== Deepwater Horizon ===
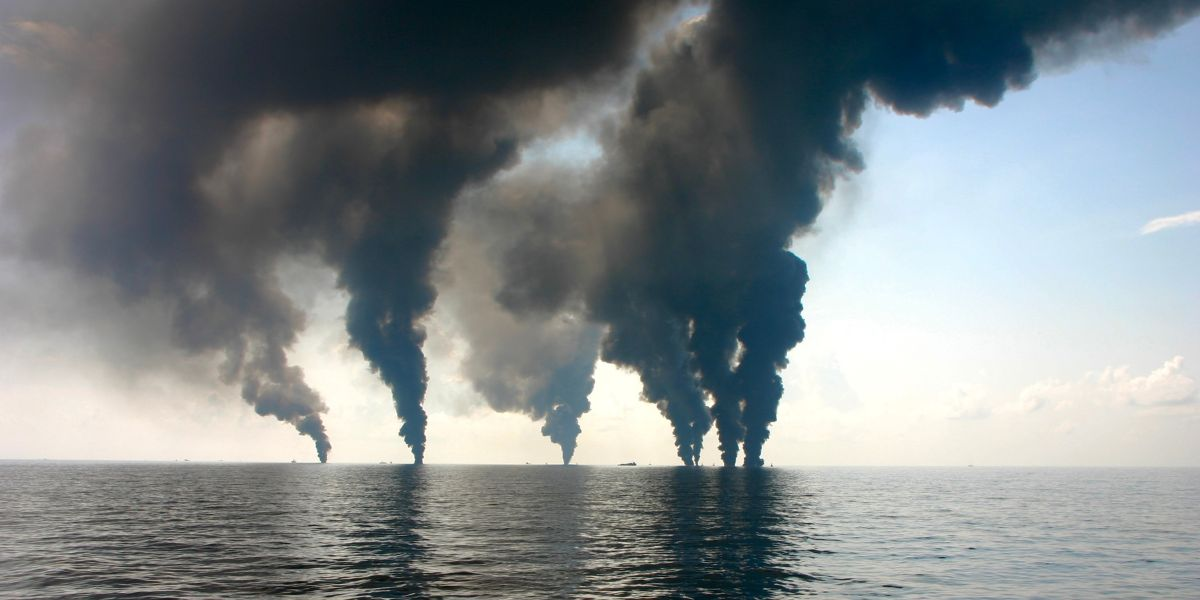
Surface burning of oil at Deepwater Horizon (by David Valentine)

Valentine was among a limited number of scientists investigating the fate and transport of methane, natural gas, and oil in the deep ocean environment prior to the Deepwater Horizon oil spill in 2010, and was among the first scientists supported to respond by the National Science Foundation. Along with his colleagues, he published a series of scientific papers describing approaches to quantify the discharge as well as the environmental behavior and impacts of discharged methane, propane (LNG); oil; and dispersant. Valentine described the atmosphere of scientific inquiry on scene at Deepwater Horizon as industrial chaos on a grand scale requiring respirators on for most of the sampling he did close in to the ruptured wellhead.

Valentine also served as a scientific communicator during this event, providing context through media interviews to outlets including the NY Times, and the LA Times, and through Op/Eds and appearances on news shows including the PBS News Hour. In one interview early in the event he correctly predicted that build-up of gas hydrate would lead to failure of a deep-sea containment device, which he has identified as a pivot point in his engagement as a science communicator. Valentine also worked with government officials in the response phase of the event to direct and conduct sampling of the deep subsurface from multiple research vessels, as documented in the New Yorker through the writing of embedded reporter Raffi Khatchadourian. Later Valentine served as an expert for the Trustees of Natural Resource Damage Assessment, which was a component of the settlement agreement for penalties and damages.

Valentine's work during Deepwater Horizon led to some disagreement and controversy. Valentine and his colleagues' publication on the fate of discharged methane created some disagreement among scientists, whereas his paper on the fallout plume of oil from the event created controversy when the responsible party, BP, put out a statement questioning the findings. The controversy around the fallout plume was later resolved when a team led by Jeff Chanton confirmed Valentine's conclusions with alternate methods.

=== Oil Spills and Offshore Production ===
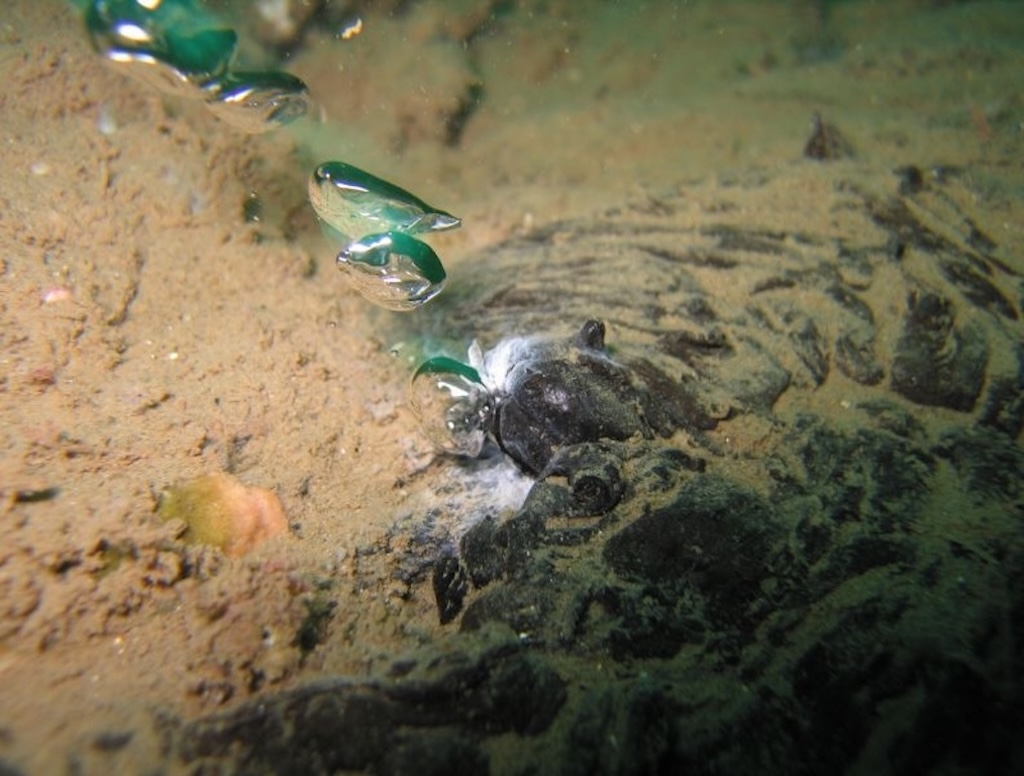
Microbial communities around tar and gas seep from the ocean floor in the Santa Barbara Channel off Coal Oil Point (by David Valentine)

Valentine participated in the response to the Refugio Beach Oil Spill, serving as a topical and local area expert for the event's Unified Command. He engaged in the scientific response, identifying submerged oil from the spill, tracking offshore transport of oil that eventually caused beach closures when it came ashore in Los Angeles, and conducting chemical forensics to differentiate spilled oil from natural seeps located nearby. Valentine was embedded within the Unified Command for the response phase and applied his scientific experience in public meetings and press conferences. Following the response phase, Valentine served as an expert for the Refugio Beach Oil Spill Natural Resource Damage Assessment for the State of California, contributing to the settlement agreement between the government and the responsible party, Plains All American Pipeline. Valentine also served as an expert witness testifying for the prosecution in the criminal case against Plains All American Pipeline, for which the corporation received a felony conviction. Valentine further engaged with media and other outlets as a scientific communicator to contextualize this spill event for the public. He has also engaged with other spill events through both research and science communication, most notably including the Orange County Oil Spill in 2021. Valentine has further engaged in the public discussion about oil production offshore California and related subjects.

=== Offshore waste disposal site ===
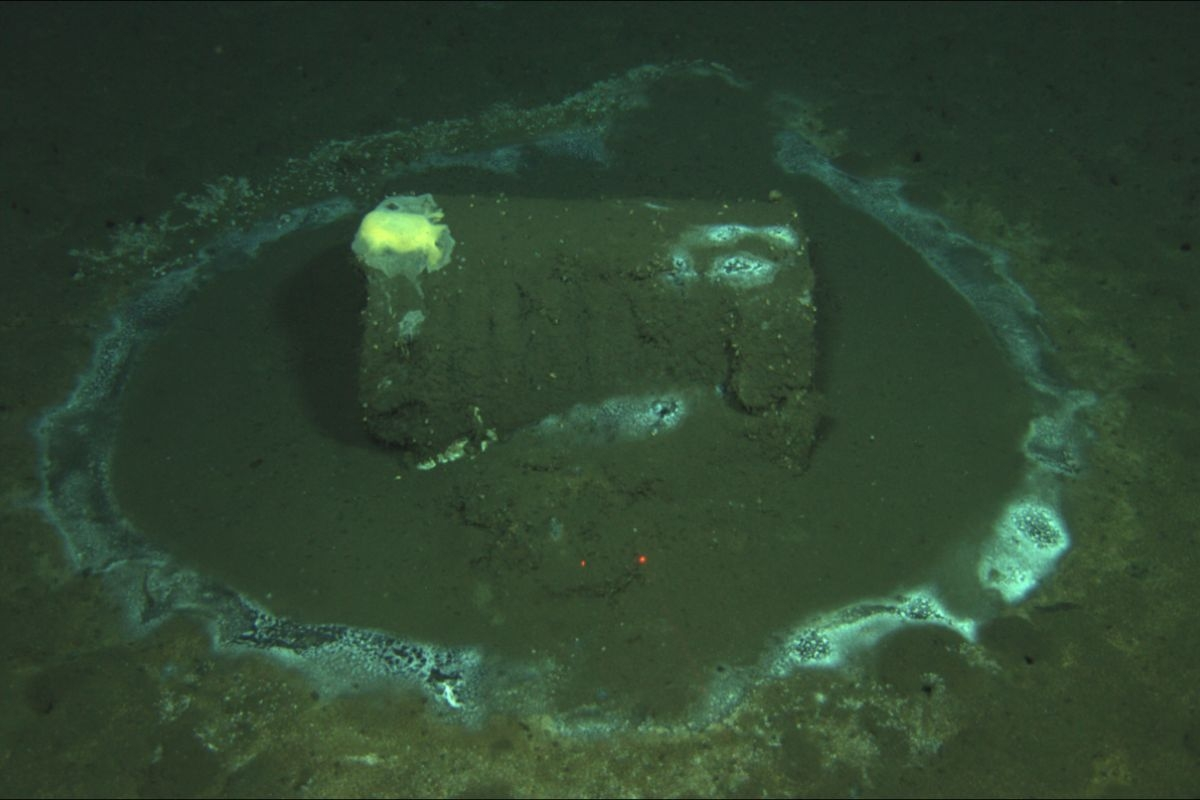
A waste barrel sits on the seafloor off the coast of Los Angeles (by David Valentine and ROV Jason)

During a 2011 expedition aboard the Research Vessel Atlantis, Valentine and his team used the autonomous underwater vehicle (AUV) Sentry and remotely operated vehicle (ROV) Jason to uncover an industrial waste disposal site located in the deep coastal ocean off Los Angeles. He contacted the LA Times reporter Rosanna Xia to describe the site and its relationship to DDT waste disposal, triggering Xia to conduct a major investigative report. Xia's reporting of Valentine's research triggered substantial scientific and political interest, triggering in turn federal and state funding initiatives as well as a historical investigation by the EPA. Subsequent research by Valentine and by his collaborators has revealed the scope and persistence of the DDT pollution, extensive littering of the seabed in the region with manmade debris targets, and further revealed the likely disposal of low-level radioactive waste in this area. Valentine has also served a scientific communicator on this issue, talking regularly with reporters, policy makers and elected officials, including numerous interviews with the LA Times and appearances on CBS Saturday Morning, and the PBS News Hour. In 2025, Valentine and his team reported that the DDT-contaminated seafloor area exceeded 300 square miles and further provided a possible explanation as to why some barrels exhibit halos. In 2026, the Ocean Protection and DDT Reduction Act was introduced to the US Congress based in large part on Valentine's work .

=== The Marine Science Program at UC Santa Barbara ===
In 2018 Valentine became the founding director of the Marine Science Major in the College of Creative Studies at the University of California Santa Barbara, the founding of which he credits to a visioning exercise he conducted as part of the Aldo Leopold leadership training in 2013. The program accepted its first cohort of students in 2023 and as of 2024 accepts freshman and transfer applicants. Valentine described his vision for the major as not wanting the Marine Science major to be this massive, sprawling thing, but rather with a modest enrollment of around 50 students that allows it to be a little bit of a different major, where it can be very research-focused and without a lot of the firm requirements of a traditional major.

=== The Valentine Lab ===
His lab investigates fundamental questions at the intersection of biogeochemistry, ecology, and evolution. Valentine's team collaborated with John Kessler of Texas A&M University to study the Deepwater Horizon oil spill, employing "off-label" uses of advanced analytical instruments to measure microbial consumption of hydrocarbon gases in near-real time. By labeling gases with stable isotopes, they were able to track the rate at which microbes convert hydrocarbons to carbon dioxide directly at sea, a technique that previously would have required labor-intensive analyses back on land. This research approach, which was detailed in a publication in Science, helped refine methods for identifying and studying the bacteria responsible for hydrocarbon degradation.

== Out of Plain Sight ==
In 2024, Valentine was featured in the documentary Out of Plain Sight, which first premiered at the DOC NYC film festival, and then at the Santa Barbara International Film Festival where it won the audience award. The film opens with Valentine's discovery of discarded industrial waste in the deep coastal ocean and follows LA Times reporter Rosanna Xia, as she and Valentine uncover the expanding scope of the issue. Valentine appears in numerous scenes in the film including those shot with ROV Jason at Woods Hole Oceanographic Institution, aboard the Research Vessel Yellowfin, at various beach locations, and on the UC Santa Barbara campus. The film was selected as the opening night film of the Slamdance 2025 film festival, received the Shared Earth Award for Advocacy from the 2025 DCEFF film festival, received the Best Feature award at the 2025 International Wildlife Film Festival, the Audience Award at the Berkshire International Film Festival, and the Special Jury Award for Environmental Justice at the Mendocino Film Festival.

== Awards ==
- UCSB Chancellor's award for Mentorship of Undergraduate Research, 2008.
- Selected Fellow, Aldo Leopold Leadership Program (now Earth Leadership Program), 2013.
- Norris Presidential Endowed Chair in Earth Science, UC Santa Barbara, 2018.
- Elected Fellow of the American Association for the Advancement of Science, 2019.
- Elected Fellow of the American Academy of Microbiology, 2021.
- Inducted to the University of California Irvine Physical Sciences Hall of Fame, 2021.
- Elected Fellow of the American Geophysical Union, 2024.
- Awarded the Faculty Research Lecturer Award by the Academic Senate of the University of California, Santa Barbara, 2024.
- Awarded the William S. and Carelyn Y. Reeburgh Lecture by the American Geophysical Union, 2026.
- Awarded the Ambassador Award by the American Geophysical Union, 2026.

== Selected publications ==
=== Articles ===
- Valentine, David L., and William S. Reeburgh. "New perspectives on anaerobic methane oxidation: minireview." Environmental microbiology 2, no. 5 (2000): 477–484. doi:10.1046/j.1462-2920.2000.00135.x
- Valentine, David L. "Biogeochemistry and microbial ecology of methane oxidation in anoxic environments: a review." Antonie Van Leeuwenhoek 81 (2002): 271–282. doi:10.1023/A:1020587206351
- Valentine, David L., Amnat Chidthaisong, Andrew Rice, William S. Reeburgh, and Stanley C. Tyler. "Carbon and hydrogen isotope fractionation by moderately thermophilic methanogens." Geochimica et Cosmochimica Acta 68, no. 7 (2004): 1571–1590. doi:10.1016/j.gca.2003.10.012
- Valentine, David L. "Adaptations to energy stress dictate the ecology and evolution of the Archaea." Nature Reviews Microbiology 5, no. 4 (2007): 316–323. doi:10.1038/nrmicro1619
- Dinsdale, Elizabeth A., Robert A. Edwards, Dana Hall, Florent Angly, Mya Breitbart, Jennifer M. Brulc, Mike Furlan et al. "Functional metagenomic profiling of nine biomes." Nature 452, no. 7187 (2008): 629–632. doi:10.1038/nature06810
- Valentine, David L., John D. Kessler, Molly C. Redmond, Stephanie D. Mendes, Monica B. Heintz, Christopher Farwell, Lei Hu et al. "Propane respiration jump-starts microbial response to a deep oil spill." Science 330, no. 6001 (2010): 208–211. doi:10.1126/science.1196830
- Kujawinski, Elizabeth B., Melissa C. Kido Soule, David L. Valentine, Angela K. Boysen, Krista Longnecker, and Molly C. Redmond. "Fate of dispersants associated with the Deepwater Horizon oil spill." Environmental science & technology 45, no. 4 (2011): 1298–1306. doi:10.1021/es103838p
- Kessler, John D., David L. Valentine, Molly C. Redmond, Mengran Du, Eric W. Chan, Stephanie D. Mendes, Erik W. Quiroz et al. "A persistent oxygen anomaly reveals the fate of spilled methane in the deep Gulf of Mexico." Science 331, no. 6015 (2011): 312–315. doi:10.1126/science.1199697
- Redmond, Molly C., and David L. Valentine. "Natural gas and temperature structured a microbial community response to the Deepwater Horizon oil spill." Proceedings of the National Academy of Sciences 109, no. 50 (2012): 20292–20297. doi:10.1073/pnas.1108756108
- Aeppli, Christoph, Catherine A. Carmichael, Robert K. Nelson, Karin L. Lemkau, William M. Graham, Molly C. Redmond, David L. Valentine, and Christopher M. Reddy. "Oil weathering after the Deepwater Horizon disaster led to the formation of oxygenated residues." Environmental science & technology 46, no. 16 (2012): 8799–8807. doi:10.1021/es3015138
- Nayfach, Stephen, Simon Roux, Rekha Seshadri, Daniel Udwary, Neha Varghese, Frederik Schulz, Dongying Wu et al. "A genomic catalog of Earth’s microbiomes." Nature biotechnology 39, no. 4 (2021): 499–509. doi:10.1038/s41587-020-0718-6

== Personal life ==
=== Jonestown Tragedy ===
During his childhood, several members of Valentine's family joined the People's Temple, a religious movement in Northern California. His Aunt Deborah Layton, Uncle Lawrence Layton, Grandmother Lisa Layton, and other family members all moved with the congregation to Jonestown Guyana. As described in his Aunt's book Seductive Poison, five-year-old Valentine played an unwitting but dramatic role in the return of his Aunt, Deborah Layton, to the United States, which enabled her testimony to members of congress about the conditions in Jonestown, in-turn prompting the doomed visit of Congressman Leo Ryan to Guyana.

== Photography ==
Valentine is an amateur photographer and his images have been published in a number of on-line venues. His images have also been used as cover art for various scientific journals and reports including the Proceedings of the National Academy of Sciences, Geophysical Research Letters, Environmental Science and Technology, Applied and Environmental Microbiology, EOS, and by the National Academies.
