= Quintessence: The Quality of Having It =

- Author: Betty Cornfeld, Owen Edwards
- Publication date: 1983
- ISBN: 9780517550892

Quintessence: The Quality of Having It (ISBN 0-517-55089-X) is a book by Betty Cornfeld and Owen Edwards, originally published in 1983 and reissued in 2001.

In 1983 it was recommended by The New York Times as a potential Christmas present.
