= Fifth Element =

Fifth Element may refer to:

== Elements ==
- Aether (classical element), the fifth classical element, also known as quintessence
- Boron, the (modern) element with atomic number 5 on the periodic table

== Arts and entertainment ==
- The Fifth Element, a 1997 film by Luc Besson starring Bruce Willis and Milla Jovovich
  - The Fifth Element (video game), a 1998 video game based on the film
- The Fifth Sacred Thing, which has also been referred to as The Fifth Element, is a novel by Starhawk

=== Music ===
- The 5th Element (Tynisha Keli album), 2010
- The 5th Element (Kellee Maize album)
- Fifth Element (Pathfinder album)
- 5th Element, the 1999 album by reggae and dancehall artist Bounty Killer
- "5th Element", 2005 hip-hop song by Nova Scotia rapper Classified

== See also ==
- Five elements (disambiguation)
- Quintessence (disambiguation)
