= Elemental (disambiguation) =

An elemental is a type of magical entity who personifies a force of nature and controls natural powers derived from their element.

Elemental may also refer to:

== Arts, entertainment, and media ==
=== Comics and literature ===
- "Elemental" (story), a 1984 story by Geoffrey A. Landis
- Elementals (Comico Comics), an American superhero comic book by Bill Willingham
- Elementals (comics), a number of different comics titles and characters of the same name
- The Elementals, a 1981 novel by Michael McDowell.

=== Fictional entities ===
- Elemental (Dungeons & Dragons), a type of creature from the role-playing game (based on the alchemical creature)
- Elemental (The Chronicles of Riddick), a fictional race that evolved from humans in the film The Chronicles of Riddick
- Elemental, a type of power armor used by the Clans in the BattleTech franchise
- Elemental, a species in the Mortal Kombat game universe
- Elementals, a villainous group of sentient masks from the 2001 video game Crash Bandicoot: The Wrath of Cortex
- Elementals (Marvel Comics), a fictional organization in the Marvel Universe

=== Games ===
- Elemental (video game), a 1988 action-strategy video game by Erick Dupuis
- Elemental: War of Magic, a 2010 turn-based strategy video game by Stardock

=== Music ===
- Elemental (Cesium 137 album), the second album from American band Cesium 137
- Elemental (Cobalt 60 album)
- Elemental (Loreena McKennitt album), a 1985 album by Canadian singer and harpist Loreena McKennitt
- Elemental (Demdike Stare album), 2012
- Elemental (Tears for Fears album), a 1993 album by British pop band Tears for Fears
  - "Elemental" (song), the title track from that album
- Elemental (The Fixx album), a 1998 album by The Fixx
- Elemental (soundtrack), the soundtrack to the 2023 animated film
- "Elementals", a composition by Dave Brubeck for jazz combo and orchestra
- Elemental (Dee Dee Bridgewater and Bill Charlap album), a 2025 album

=== Other uses in arts, entertainment, and media ===
- Elemental (2012 film), an American documentary film
- Elemental (2023 film), an animated film from Pixar
- Elemental (music group), a Croatian hip-hop group
- Elemental, a health and wellness website published by Medium
- "Elemental", 233th episode of Adventure Time

== Other uses ==
- Elemental Technologies, Inc., a video software company in Portland, Oregon
- Professor Elemental, steampunk hip-hop artist

== See also ==
- Element (disambiguation)
- Elementary (disambiguation)
