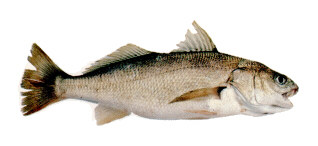

Conservation status
- Least Concern (IUCN 3.1)

Scientific classification
- Kingdom: Animalia
- Phylum: Chordata
- Class: Actinopterygii
- Division: Teleostei
- Order: Acanthuriformes
- Family: Sciaenidae
- Genus: Genyonemus; Gill, 1861
- Species: G. lineatus

Binomial name
- Genyonemus lineatus (Ayres, 1855)

Synonyms
- Leiostomus lineatus Ayres, 1855

= White croaker =

White croaker Temporal range: Late Miocene–present

Species of fish

White croaker (Genyonemus lineatus) is a species of croaker occurring in the Eastern Pacific. White croakers have been taken from Magdalena Bay, Baja California Sur, to Vancouver Island, British Columbia, but are not abundant north of San Francisco. White croakers swim in loose schools at or near the bottom of sandy areas. Sometimes they aggregate in the surf zone or in shallow bays and lagoons. Most of the time they are found in offshore areas at depths of 3 to 30 meters (10 to 100 ft). On rare occasions they are fairly abundant at depths as great as 200 meters (660 feet).

The white croaker is the only species of in the genus Genyonemus. A fossil relative, G. whistleri, is known from the Late Miocene-aged Puente Formation of the Los Angeles Basin. Other common names for the fish include Pasadena trout, tommy croaker, and little bass.

== Description ==
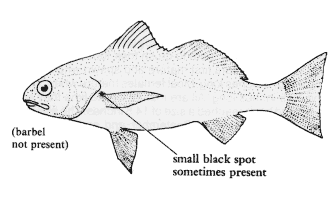
Identification

The body of the white croaker is elongate and somewhat compressed. The head is oblong and bluntly rounded, with a mouth that is somewhat underneath the head. The color is incandescent brownish to yellowish on the back becoming silvery below. The fins are yellow to white. The white croaker is one of five California croakers that have mouths located under their heads (subterminal). They can be distinguished from the California corbina and yellowfin croaker by the absence of a single fleshy projection, or barbel, at the tip of the lower jaw. The 12 to 15 spines in the first dorsal fin serve to distinguish white croakers from all the other croakers with sub-terminal mouths, since none of these has more than 11 spines in this fin.

White croakers eat a variety of fishes, squid, shrimp, octopus, worms, small crabs, clams and other items, either living or dead. While the ages of white croakers have not been determined conclusively, it is thought that some live as long as 15 or more years. Some spawn for the first time when they are between 2 and 3 years old. At this age they are only 12 to 15 cm (4.7 to 5.9 in) long and weigh less than 45 grams (0.099 pounds). Also have barbels on the lower lip. The largest recorded specimen was 41.4 cm (16.3 in), no weight recorded; however, a 36.8 cm (14.5 in) white croaker weighed 640 grams (1 lb 6½ oz).

== Fishing information ==
These fish can be caught on almost any kind of animal bait that is fished from piers or jetties in sandy or sandy mud areas. In fact, they are so easily hooked that most anglers consider them a nuisance of the worst sort. If a person desires to fish specifically for white croakers a tough, difficult-to-steal bait, such as squid, is recommended. When hooked, they put up little or no fight. Fishing and catching is good throughout the year.

White Croaker caught around Los Angeles should not be eaten due to their especially high exposure to the DDT and other contaminants material dumped in the water there. Caution is advisable across all of California and especially Southern California.

== Cuisine ==
White croaker meat has been used as a co-ingredient in creating Crab stick.
