= Daniel Straub =

American director and filmmaker (born 1995)

- Born: Daniel Straub; March 1, 1995 (age 31)
- Occupation: Filmmaker

Daniel Straub is an American documentary filmmaker. He directed Out of Plain Sight, a feature documentary for the Los Angeles Times about ocean dumping off the coast of Los Angeles, and the short documentary A Short Documentary About a Giant Pencil about the Loti Pencil in Minneapolis, Minnesota.

== Early life ==
Straub was inspired to make films by watching the behind the scenes documentary for Raiders of the Lost Ark by Laurent Bouzereau.

== Career ==
Straub began his directing career with Out of Plain Sight, a feature documentary about the ocean disposal of waste from the manufacturing of DDT. The film premiered at DOC NYC in November 2024.

His next project, A Short Documentary About a Giant Pencil told the story of the creation of the Loti Pencil sculpture in Minneapolis. It premiered at the Santa Barbara International Film Festival where it won Best Short Documentary. The film was also an official selection of the 2026 Minneapolis Saint Paul International Film Festivalthe RiverRun International Film Festival, the Berkshire International Film Festival, and the Nantucket Film Festival.

== Accolades ==
Festival/Organisation	Date	Award/Category	Recipient	Result	Ref.
Santa Barbara International Film Festival	February 15, 2025	Audience Choice Award	Out of Plain Sight	Won	
Environmental Film Festival in the Nation's Capital	March 29, 2025	Shared Earth Foundation Award	Out of Plain Sight	Won	
International Wildlife Film Festival	April 15, 2025	Best Feature	Out of Plain Sight	Won	
Mendocino Film Festival	May 29, 2025	Special Jury Award for Environmental Justice	Out of Plain Sight	Won	
Berkshire International Film Festival	June 1, 2025	Documentary Jury Award - Honorable Mention	Out of Plain Sight	Won	
Berkshire International Film Festival	June 2, 2025	Audience Award	Out of Plain Sight	Won	
Woods Hole Film Festival	August 2, 2025	Director's Choice Award for Fortitude in Filmmaking	Out of Plain Sight	Won	
Jackson Wild Media Awards	August 4, 2025	Investigative	Out of Plain Sight	Won	
Jackson Wild Media Awards	August 4, 2025	Science & Nature - Long Form	Out of Plain Sight	Finalist	
Coast Film Festival	November 15, 2025	MacGillivray Freeman Environmental Filmmaker Award	Out of Plain Sight	Won	
Santa Barbara International Film Festival	February 14, 2026	Best Short Documentary	A Short Documentary About A Giant Pencil	Won	

== Filmography ==
=== Feature films ===
Year	Title	Director	Producer
2025	Out of Plain Sight	Yes	Yes

=== Short films ===
Year	Title	Director	Producer
2026	A Short Documentary About a Giant Pencil	Yes	Yes
