= Out of Plain Sight =

2024 American documentary film

- Official poster
- Directed by: Daniel Straub; Rosanna Xia
- Produced by: Austin Straub; Daniel Straub; Rosanna Xia
- Cinematography: Austin Straub
- Edited by: Austin Straub
- Music by: James Ellington
- Production companies: L.A. Times Studios; Sypher Studios
- Distributed by: Submarine
- Release date: November 16, 2024 (DOC NYC)
- Running time: 94 minutes
- Country: United States
- Language: English

Out of Plain Sight is a 2024 American documentary film directed by Daniel Straub and Rosanna Xia. Produced by L.A. Times Studios, the documentary unveils the hidden environmental catastrophe just off Southern California's shores. It had its world premiere on November 16, 2024, at DOC NYC.

The film won Audience Choice Award at the 40th Santa Barbara International Film Festival on February 15, 2025. It also received the Shared Earth Foundation Award at the Environmental Film Festival in the Nation's Capital, the Best Feature award at the International Wildlife Film Festival, the Special Jury Award for Environmental Justice at Mendocino Film Festival, and the Audience Award and an Honorable Mention from the jury at Berkshire International Film Festival. It was also awarded the Director's Choice Award for Fortitude in Filmmaking at the Woods Hole Film Festival. Out of Plain Sight was also a finalist for two Jackson Wild Media Awards, in both the Investigative and Science & Nature categories. The film won the Investigative category.

== Summary ==
The subject of the documentary is UCSB professor David Valentine's discovery of toxic dumping grounds off the coast of Southern California. It follows Rosanna Xia as she investigates Valentine's initial shocking discovery and the even more alarming revelations that came afterward.

== Release ==
Out of Plain Sight premiered at the Doc NYC on November 16, 2024, in the Investigation section. It was screened at the 40th Santa Barbara International Film Festival on February 7, 2025.

The film also featured in Special Screening – Opening Night at the 31st Slamdance Film Festival on February 20, 2025 in the Spotlight Features.

It closed the Environmental Film Festival in the Nation's Capital, held in Washington, D.C., on March 29, 2025.

The film has screened at the Cleveland International Film Festival, the Miami Film Festival, the International Wildlife Film Festival, the San Diego Asian Film Festival, the Mendocino Film Festival, the Berkshire International Film Festival, Woods Hole Film Festival, Flickers' Rhode Island International Film Festival, the Jackson Wild Media Awards, the Santa Cruz Film Festival, Heartland International Film Festival, Newport Beach Film Festival, Coast Film Festival, and special screenings at the Roxie Theater in San Francisco presented with The Redford Center and the National Academy of Sciences in Washington, D.C.

The film played for one week at the Laemmle Theaters in North Hollywood, with guest Q&A moderation by The Envelope's Matt Brennan, documentary filmmaker Clay Tweel, and Academy Award Winner Wally Pfister.

== Reception ==
Robert Abele for the Los Angeles Times called the film "earthshaking filmmaking" and "propulsive."

Claudia Puig for NPR's FilmWeek said that the film "comes together like a thriller and hits like a gut punch."

Steve Kopian writing on Unseen Films described the film as "One of the best films of DOC NYC and of 2024".

Andy Howell, writing for Film Threat, said the film "dramatically illustrates both the importance and process of science and journalism, at a time when both are under attack."

Louisa Moore, writing for Screen Zealots, said the film is "one of the most chilling and vital environmental documentaries in recent memory."

Tina Kakadelis, writing for Beyond the Cineramadome, said the film "is investigative documentary journalism at its finest and most urgent."

Christopher Cross, writing for Asynchronous Media, said the documentary is "an infuriating and insightful dive into the lingering devastation of a single action" and "there’s a vitality to its investigation that demands to be seen."

Paula Farmer, writing for CultureVulture, said, "The film’s style and approach, coupled with the disturbing, yet invaluable information, and shot in way that is richly layered and deeply engaging, make for a vital addition to environmental storytelling. “Out of Plain Sight” is a documentary worth seeking out."

=== Accolades ===
Festival/Organisation	Date	Award/Category	Recipient	Result	Ref.
Santa Barbara International Film Festival	February 15, 2025	Audience Choice Award	Out of Plain Sight	Won	
Environmental Film Festival in the Nation's Capital	March 29, 2025	Shared Earth Foundation Award	Out of Plain Sight	Won	
International Wildlife Film Festival	April 15, 2025	Best Feature	Out of Plain Sight	Won	
Mendocino Film Festival	May 29, 2025	Special Jury Award for Environmental Justice	Out of Plain Sight	Won	
Berkshire International Film Festival	June 1, 2025	Documentary Jury Award - Honorable Mention	Out of Plain Sight	Won	
Berkshire International Film Festival	June 2, 2025	Audience Award	Out of Plain Sight	Won	
Woods Hole Film Festival	August 2, 2025	Director's Choice Award for Fortitude in Filmmaking	Out of Plain Sight	Won	
Jackson Wild Media Awards	August 4, 2025	Investigative	Out of Plain Sight	Won	
Jackson Wild Media Awards	August 4, 2025	Science & Nature - Long Form	Out of Plain Sight	Finalist	
Coast Film Festival	November 15, 2025	MacGillivray Freeman Environmental Filmmaker Award	Out of Plain Sight	Won	
