= A Short Documentary About a Giant Pencil =

2026 American short documentary film

A Short Documentary About A Giant Pencil
- Official poster
- Directed by: Daniel Straub
- Produced by: Austin Straub; Daniel Straub; Bryce Cyrier
- Cinematography: Austin Straub
- Edited by: Austin Straub
- Music by: James Ellington; Jesse Myers
- Release date: February 10, 2026 (SBIFF)
- Running time: 22 minutes
- Country: United States
- Language: English

A Short Documentary About A Giant Pencil is a 2026 American short documentary film directed by Daniel Straub. The documentary tells the story of the Loti Pencil sculpture in Minneapolis, Minnesota. It had its world premiere on February 10, 2026, at the Santa Barbara International Film Festival in Ultra Pencilvision, a certification that was developed exclusively for this film.

The film won Best Documentary Short at the 41st Santa Barbara International Film Festival on February 14, 2026, which qualified the film for the 99th Academy Awards. In October of 2026, the film was nominated for a Critics' Choice Documentary Award for Best Short Documentary.

A Short Documentary About A Giant Pencil was listed as a frontrunner for the 2027 Academy Award for Best Documentary Short Film in The Hollywood Reporter's Feinberg Forecast, The Hollywood Reporter's executive editor Scott Feinberg's assessment of the award season contenders.

== Summary ==
The subject of the documentary is the Loti Pencil sculpture's creation, and the yearly sharpening ceremonies held on the first Saturday of June.

== Release ==
A Short Documentary About A Giant Pencil premiered at the Santa Barbara International Film Festival on February 10, 2026. The film was also an official selection of the 2026 Minneapolis Saint Paul International Film Festival, where it played to a sold-out crowd at the Walker Art Center as well as a sold-out festival screening. The documentary was selected for the RiverRun International Film Festival, the Nantucket Film Festival, the Berkshire International Film Festival, Mendocino Film Festival, Indy Shorts, and Hollyshorts.

== Reception ==
Aaron "Dobler" Goldstein for Spoiler Free Reviews called the film "a 'sharpened' showcase of what happens when art connects and gives people a sense of community".

Brandon MacMurray listed A Short Documentary About A Giant Pencil on ShortStickFilm's Early Short Film Contenders for the 99th Academy Awards.

=== Accolades ===
Festival/Organisation	Date	Award/Category	Recipient	Result	Ref.
Santa Barbara International Film Festival	February 14, 2026	Best Short Documentary	A Short Documentary About A Giant Pencil	Won	
Nantucket Film Festival	February 14, 2026	Audience Award - Runner Up	A Short Documentary About A Giant Pencil	Won	
Emberlight International Film Festival	August 27, 2026	Best Short Documentary	A Short Documentary About A Giant Pencil	Won	
Victory International Film Festival	September 20, 2026	Best Short Documentary - Runner Up	A Short Documentary About A Giant Pencil	Won	
Footcandle Film Festival	October 6, 2026	Audience Favorite Short Documentary	A Short Documentary About A Giant Pencil	Won	
Critics' Choice Documentary Awards	October 13, 2026	Best Short Documentary	A Short Documentary About A Giant Pencil	Nominated	
