= The Last Show =

The Last Show may refer to:

- "The Last Show" (The Mary Tyler Moore Show), the final episode of The Mary Tyler Moore Show
- A Prairie Home Companion (film), a film released using this title in some markets
- The Last Show, a CD album of blues guitarist Alvin Lee's last live performance on 28 May 2012 at Raalte, Holland before he died in March 2013

== See also ==
- The Last Picture Show, 1971 film
- The Last Picture Shows, 2026 film
- The Last Show at the Madhouse, 1999 wrestling event
- The Last Showgirl, 2024 film
- The Last Showing, 2014 film
