= The Gas Station Attendant =

2025 American documentary film

- Promotional poster
- Directed by: Karla Murthy
- Produced by: Karla Murthy; Rajal Pitroda
- Starring: Karla Murthy; H. N. Shantha Murthy
- Cinematography: Karla Murthy; Andrew Fredericks, Raúl O. Paz-Pastrana, Andy Sarjahani
- Edited by: Karla Murthy
- Music by: Bobak Lotfipour
- Production companies: Greene Fort Productions; Independent Television Service; Firelight Media; Center for Asian American Media
- Release date: June 19, 2025 (Sheffield DocFest)
- Running time: 83 minutes
- Country: United States
- Language: English

The Gas Station Attendant is a 2025 documentary film written, directed and co-produced by Karla Murthy. The film is a daughter's reflections on her South Asian father’s life.

The film had its World Premiere at the Sheffield DocFest on June 19, 2025, where it won the Special Mention Jury Award in International Competition.

== Summary ==
The film follows H. N. Shantha Murthy, who left his impoverished village in India as a child and spent years travelling in search of work. His life changed after an unexpected meeting with a visiting couple from Houston, Texas, which eventually led him to the United States. However, his experiences there differed from the idealized "American Dream" he had imagined.

Director Karla Murthy combines family home videos and recorded phone calls from the period when her father was employed at a Texas gas station. Interwoven with his story are her own reflections on growing up as the daughter of immigrant parents, her father from India and her mother from the Philippines, building a life in New York City, and raising her two sons. The film becomes a personal exploration of a complex father-daughter relationship and a poignant tribute to the struggles and resilience of immigrant working‑class families.

== Cast ==
- Karla Murthy
- H. N. Shantha Murthy

== Release ==
The Gas Station Attendant had its World Premiere at the Sheffield DocFest on June 19, 2025 in International Competition.

It had its North American premiere at the Woods Hole Film Festival on July 28, 2025.

It was screened on September 20, 2025, at the Nashville Film Festival as a part of Documentary Features.

It was presented at the Hot Springs Documentary Film Festival for its Arkansas Premiere on October 16, 2025

On November 12, 2025, it was screened at the St. Louis International Film Festival in Women in Film section, and on November 19, 2025, in the 'Come As You Are' section at the Doc NYC.

The film was presented in the True Stories section of the 37th Palm Springs International Film Festival on 2 January 2026. In February 2026, it was presented in the feature films section of the 41st Santa Barbara International Film Festival.

== Accolades ==
Award	Date of ceremony	Category	Recipient(s)	Result	Ref.
Sheffield DocFest	June 22, 2025	Special Mention Jury Award	The Gas Station Attendant	Won	
Nashville Film Festival	September 24, 2025	Best Documentary Feature	The Gas Station Attendant	Won	
San Diego Asian Film Festival	November 15, 2025	Best Documentary Feature	The Gas Station Attendant	Won	
