= 40th Santa Barbara International Film Festival =

2025 edition of SBIFF

- Official 40th anniversary poster
- Opening film: Jane Austen Wrecked My Life by Laura Piani
- Closing film: A Missing Part by Guillaume Senez
- Location: Santa Barbara, California, United States
- Founded: 1986
- Awards: Kirk Douglas Award: Will Ferrell; Maltin Modern Master Award: Angelina Jolie; Audience Choice Award: Out of Plain Sight by Daniel Straub, Rosanna Xia
- Hosted by: Santa Barbara International Film Festival (organization)
- Artistic director: Claudia Puig
- No. of films: 185
- Festival date: Opening: 4 February 2025; Closing: 15 February 2025
- Website: SBIFF

Santa Barbara International Film Festival
- 2026 2024

The 40th Santa Barbara International Film Festival, is the 2025 edition of the Santa Barbara International Film Festival, which took place from February 4 to February 15, 2025, at Santa Barbara, California, United States. In October November and December 2024, honorary awards were announced which are: Outstanding Performer of the Year Award for Ralph Fiennes; Kirk Douglas Award For Excellence In Film for Will Ferrell; Maltin Modern Master Award for Angelina Jolie and Arlington Artist Of The Year Award for Timothée Chalamet.

On November 19, 2024, Virtuosos Award was announced for Kieran Culkin (A Real Pain), Harris Dickinson (Babygirl), Karla Sofía Gascón and Selena Gomez (Emilia Pérez), Ariana Grande (Wicked), Clarence Maclin (Sing Sing), Mikey Madison (Anora) and John Magaro (September 5)

It opened with Jane Austen Wrecked My Life a French and English-language romantic comedy French film by Laura Piani.

It closed on February 15, with A Missing Part (Une part manquante) a Belgian-French drama film by Guillaume Senez, story of a French taxi driver in Tokyo, who lost custody of his half-Japanese daughter after a divorce. In the festival 185 films from 60 countries were showcased. Out of Plain Sight, a documentary film directed by Daniel Straub, Rosanna Xia, unveiling the hidden environmental catastrophe just beyond Southern California's shores, won 'The Audience Choice Award'.

== Overview ==
In its 40th anniversary in 2025, the festival extended by an extra day and featured 33 world premieres and 74 United States premieres from 60 nations. 52% of the film directed by women were showcased. The event also included tributes to the year's leading talents, panel discussions, and free educational and community outreach programs.

On February 9, Demi Moore was feted with Career Retrospective And Conversation by screening her films from February 7 to February 10.

- February 7: Indecent Proposal
- February 9: The Substance, followed by Q&A
- February 10: Ghost

=== Opening and closing nights ===
The festival opened on February 4 with Jane Austen Wrecked My Life a French and English-language romantic comedy, French film by Laura Piani.

It closed on February 14, with A Missing Part (Une part manquante) a Belgian-French drama film by Guillaume Senez. The award-winning films were announced at a ceremony hosted at El Encanto, selected by the jury. In all 185 films from 60 countries were featured in the festival. Audience Choice Award was given to Out of Plain Sight, a documentary by Daniel Straub, Rosanna Xia, which focuses on Professor Valentine’s DDT dump discovery.

== Events ==
- February 5 – Maltin Modern Master Award honoring Angelina Jolie
- February 6 – Outstanding Performer of the Year Award honoring Ralph Fiennes
- February 8 – Variety Artisans Award, honoring Judy Becker – The Brutalist – Production Design, Kris Bowers - The Wild Robot – Original Score, Clément Ducol and Camille – Emilia Pérez – Original Song, Nick Emerson – Conclave – Editing, Jomo Fray – Nickel Boys – Cinematography, Tod A. Maitland – A Complete Unknown – Sound, Pierre-Olivier Persin – The Substance – Hair/Makeup, Paul Tazewell – Wicked – Costume Design, Erik Winquist – Kingdom of the Planet of the Apes – VFX
- February 9 – Virtuosos Award honoring Kieran Culkin (A Real Pain), Harris Dickinson (Babygirl), Karla Sofía Gascón and Selena Gomez (Emilia Pérez), Ariana Grande (Wicked), Clarence Maclin (Sing Sing), Mikey Madison (Anora) and John Magaro (September 5)
- February 10 – Outstanding Directors Award honorees
  - Brady Corbet, The Brutalist
  - Coralie Fargeat, The Substance
  - Jacques Audiard, Emilia Pérez
  - James Mangold, A Complete Unknown
  - Sean Baker, Anora
- February 11 – Arlington Artist of the Year honoring Timothée Chalamet
- February 12 – American Riviera Award honoring Zoe Saldaña
- February 13 – Cinema Vanguard Award honoring Adrien Brody and Guy Pearce
- February 14 – Montecito Award honoring Colman Domingo

== Jury ==
- Estrella Araiza, a Mexican cultural manager, Managing Director, Guadalajara International Film Festival
- Max Barbakow, an American filmmaker
- Moses Bwayo, a Peabody and International Documentary Association (IDA) award-winning filmmaker
- Andres Castillo, Managing Director and Senior Programmer, Miami International Film Festival
- Jeff Christian, filmmaker
- Jimmy Jean-Louis, a Haitian actor and producer
- Margaret Lazarus, an American film producer and director
- Jena Malone, an American actress
- Gregory Nava, an American film director, producer and screenwriter
- Shawn Patterson, American composer and songwriter

== Official selection ==
=== Opening and closing films ===
| English title | Original title | Director(s) | Production countrie(s) |
Opening film
| Jane Austen Wrecked My Life | | Laura Piani | France |
Closing film
| A Missing Part | Une part manquante | Guillaume Senez | Belgium, France |

=== World Premiere Feature Films ===
- Ai Weiwei’s Turandot, Maxim Derevianko, Italy
- An Arrangement, Noree Victoria, United States
- Enchanted Matter: The Art of Robert Powell, Tom Piozet, United States
- In the Red, Mimi Chakarova, United States
- I Was a Teenage Sex Pistol, Nick Mead, Andre Relis, United States
- Magic Hour, Jacqueline Christy, United States
- Mistura, Ricardo de Montreuil, Peru
- O Horizon, Madeleine Rotzler, United States
- Paddle Out, Sebi Lee, Melissa Pappageorgas, United States
- Parrot Kindergarten, Amy Herdy, United States
- Roads of Fire, Nathaniel Lezra, United States
- Row of Life, Soraya Simi, United States
- Spider & Jessie, Dan Kay, United States
- Spring of the Vanishing, Andrew Glazer, United States

=== US Premiere Feature Films ===
- Across the Sea (La mer au loin), Saïd Hamich Benlarbi, France, Morocco, Belgium
- Among Neighbors, Yoav Potash, United States
- Aontas, Damian McCann, Ireland
- At the Door of the House Who Will Come Knocking (Ko će pokucati na vrata mog doma), Maja Novaković, Serbia, Bosnia and Herzegovina
- Bauryna Salu, Askhat Kuchinchirekov, Kazakhstan
- Can I Get a Witness?, Ann Marie Fleming, Canada
- Carissa, Jason Jacobs, Devon Delmar, South Africa
- Crocodile Tears (Air mata buaya), Tumpal Tampubolon, Indonesia
- Democracy Under Siege, Laura Nix, Belgium, Luxembourg, USA
- Fine Young Men (Hombres íntegros), Alejandro Andrade Pease, Mexico, Spain, France
- Glimmers, Pilar Palomero, Spain
- Horizon: An American Saga – Chapter 2, Kevin Costner, United States
- Maydegol, Sarvnaz Alambeigi, Iran, Germany, France
- Olivia & the Clouds, Tomás Pichardo Espaillat, Dominican Republic
- Seeking Haven for Mr. Rambo, Khaled Mansour, Egypt, Saudi Arabia
- Yen and Ai-Lee (Xiao Yan Yu Wu Ai-Lee), Tom Lin Shu-yu, Taiwan

=== Non Premiere Feature Films ===
- All God’s Children, Ondi Timoner, United States
- Balomanía, Sissel Morell Dargis, Denmark, Spain
- Beyond the Gaze: Jule Campbell’s Swimsuit Issue, Jill Campbell, United States
- Beyond the Horizon, Mark Gillard, United States
- The Bitter Pill, Clay Tweel, United States
- Blue Road: The Edna O’Brien Story, Sinéad O’Shea, Ireland, United Kingdom
- Bustin’ Down the Door, Jeremy Gosch, United States
- Coastal, Daryl Hannah, United States
- Color Book, David Fortune, United States
- Coup 53, Taghi Amirani, United Kingdom, United States, Iran
- Lilly, Rachel Feldman, United States
- Out of Plain Sight, Daniel Straub, Rosanna Xia, United States
- Separated, Errol Morris, United States, Mexico

=== 2025 SBIFF Short Films ===
- 26,000 Days, Henry Behel, United States
- 4th Dementia, Ian Wexler, United States
- Adiós, José Prats, Spain
- All Things Metal, Motoki Otsuka, United States
- L'Avance, Djiby Kebe, France
- Azi, Montana Mann, United States
- Balloon, Law Chen, United States
- Battle of the Blues, Adam Ernster, United States
- Beautiful Men, Nicolas Keppens, Belgium/France/Netherlands
- Betye Saar: Drifting Toward Twilight, Kyle Provencio Reingold, United States
- A Bird Flew (Un pájaro voló), Leinad Pájaro De la Hoz, Colombia/Cuba
- Bitter Chocolate (Shokolate Talkh), Sahar Sotoodeh, Iran/Germany
- Bug Diner, Phoebe Jane Hart, United States
- The Devil Is Busy, Christalyn Hampton and Geeta Gandbhir, United States
- Did You Forget Mr. Fogel?, Max Karpman, United States
- The Flamingo, Corina Mazzi, United States
- Gender Reveal, Mo Matton, Canada
- George, Aaron Craig and Alex Craig, United States
- The Green Buffalo, Joel Caldwell, United States
- Hello Stranger, Amélie Hardy, Canada
- Hold Up, Ori Guendelman, United States
- Hymn of the Plague (Gimn Chume), Ataka51, Russia/Germany
- I Accidentally Stepped on a Flower (Aksidentalisht Shkela Një Lule), Eneos Çarka and Stivi Imami, Albania
- Icebreakers, Jocelyn Glatzer and Marlo Poras, United States
- Imogene, Katie Blair, United States
- Is Now a Good Time, Jim Cummings, United States
- Keep the Funk, Gareth Kelly, United States
- The Kelp We Breathe, Jack Phillips, Natalie Aymond, Tatum Davis and Taylor Ortiz, United States
- Last Hope, Lena Kaminsky, United States
- The Last Observers, Maja K Mikkelsen, United States
- Leonie, Skeet & the Piglets (Leonie, Skeet & de biggen), Jip Heijenga, Belgium
- Little Monsters (Les Petits Monstres), Pablo Léridon, France
- London, KY, Cody Duncum, United States
- Mango, Joan Iyiola, United Kingdom/France
- Massacre of the Innocents, SaraKlara Hellström, Sweden
- Meet Me at the Creek (ᏗᏂᏠᎯ ᎤᏪᏯ), Loren Waters, United States
- Mother’s Day, Kathryn Boyd Brolin, United States
- Mr. Floof, Claire Taback Sliney, United States
- My Memory-Walls (Mes murs-mémoire), Axel Robin, Canada
- The New Yorker Theater: The Talbots’ Legacy, Sergio Maza, United States/Argentina
- Not Just Water, Tess McCormick, United States
- O, Rúnar Rúnarsson, Iceland
- On a Sunday at Eleven, Alicia K. Harris, Canada
- On Weary Wings Go By (Linnud läinud), Anu-Laura Tuttelberg, Estonia/Lithuania
- Our Own Shadow (Nuestra sombra), Agustina Sánchez Gavier, Germany/Argentina
- perfectly a strangeness, Alison McAlpine, Canada
- The Poison Cat, Tian Guan, China
- quwa’, Jonathan Coronado, Ryan Grant, Jade Ipina and Catherine Scanlon, United States
- Ragamuffin, Kaitlyn Mikayla, United States
- Road Kill, Ryan Farhoudi, United States
- Shadows, Rand Beiruty, France, Jordan
- Shutter Bird, Réi, United States
- Sirius, Jean-Bastien Niyigaruye, Canada
- Snow Day!, Kiara Lin, United States
- A Swim Lesson, Rashida Jones, Will McCormack, United States
- Terminally Ill, Christopher J. Cole, United States
- The Three Sisters, Timur Kognov, Cyprus
- Tornado, Jack Kendirck, United States
- Travelling Home, Juliet Klottrup, United Kingdom
- The Truck, Elizabeth Rao, United States
- Twain, Pip, United Kingdom
- Washed Away (Naufrage), Aucéane Roux, Canada
- WAShhh, Mickey Lai, Malaysia/Ireland
- Weeds (Plevel), Pola Kazak, Czech Republic
- Where Time Stood Still (Sadac Dro Idga), Nino Benashvili, Georgia
- Who Loves the Sun, Arshia Shakiba, Canada
- The Wolf, Theodore Ushev, Canada
- The Wool Aliens, Julia Parks, United Kingdom

== Awards ==
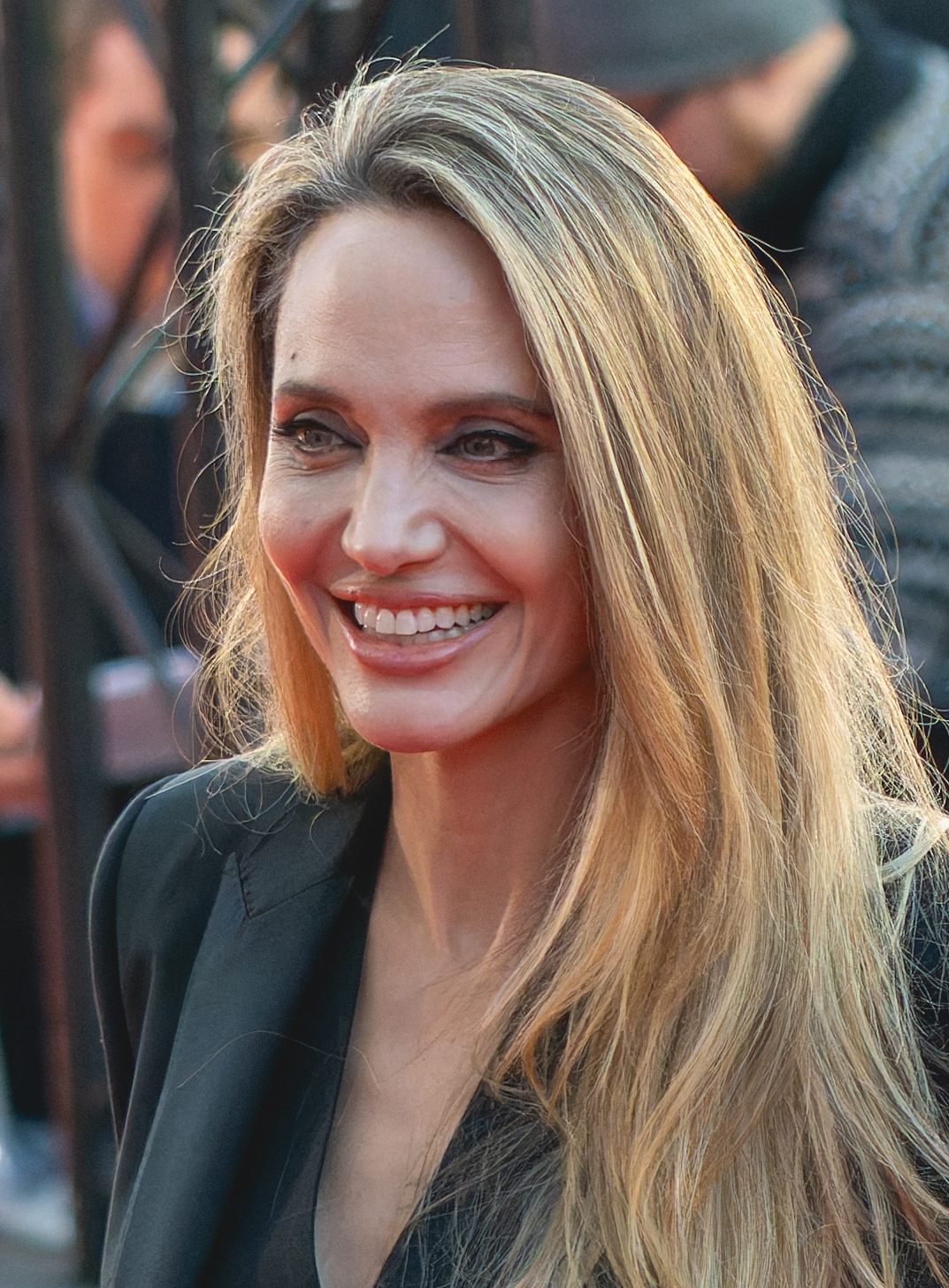
Angelina Jolie Maltin Modern Master Award recipient

Sources

- Audience Choice Award: Out of Plain Sight by Daniel Straub, Rosanna Xia
- Panavision Spirit Award for Independent Cinema: O Horizon by Madeleine Rotzler
- Jeffrey C. Barbakow Award – Best International Feature Film: Yen and Ai-Lee by Tom Lin Shu-yu
- Best Documentary Award: Roads of Fire by Nathaniel Lezra
- Nueva Vision Award for Spain/Latin America Cinema: Glimmers by Pilar Palomero
- Social Justice Award for Documentary Film: Separated by Errol Morris
- The ASC Award for Cinematography: Color Book by David Fortune
- ADL Stand Up Award: Lilly by Rachel Feldman
- Best Documentary Short Film Award: The Green Buffalo by Joel Caldwell
- Bruce Corwin Award – Best Live-Action Short Film Bitter Chocolate by Sahar Sotoodeh
- Bruce Corwin Award – Best Animated Short Film The Three Sisters by Timur Kognov
- Kirk Douglas Award For Excellence In Film: Will Ferrell
- Maltin Modern Master Award: Angelina Jolie
- Montecito Award: Colman Domingo
- Outstanding Performer(s) of the Year Award: Ralph Fiennes for Conclave
- The American Riviera Award: Zoe Saldaña
- Cinema Vanguard Award:
  - Adrien Brody
  - Guy Pearce
- Arlington Award: Timothée Chalamet
- Virtuosos Award:
  - Kieran Culkin (A Real Pain)
  - Harris Dickinson (Babygirl)
  - Karla Sofía Gascón and Selena Gomez (Emilia Pérez)
  - Ariana Grande (Wicked)
  - Clarence Maclin (Sing Sing)
  - Mikey Madison (Anora)
  - John Magaro (September 5)
  - Sebastian Stan (The Apprentice)
  - Fernanda Torres (I'm Still Here)
- Variety Artisans Award:
  - Judy Becker – The Brutalist – Production Design
  - Kris Bowers - The Wild Robot – Original Score
  - Clément Ducol and Camille – Emilia Pérez – Original Song
  - Nick Emerson – Conclave – Editing
  - Jomo Fray – Nickel Boys – Cinematography
  - Tod A. Maitland – A Complete Unknown – Sound
  - Pierre-Olivier Persin – The Substance – Hair/Makeup
  - Paul Tazewell – Wicked – Costume Design
  - Erik Winquist – Kingdom of the Planet of the Apes – VFX
- Outstanding Directors of the Year:
  - Brady Corbet, The Brutalist
  - Coralie Fargeat, The Substance
  - Jacques Audiard, Emilia Pérez
  - James Mangold, A Complete Unknown
  - Sean Baker, Anora
