= Gaslit (film) =

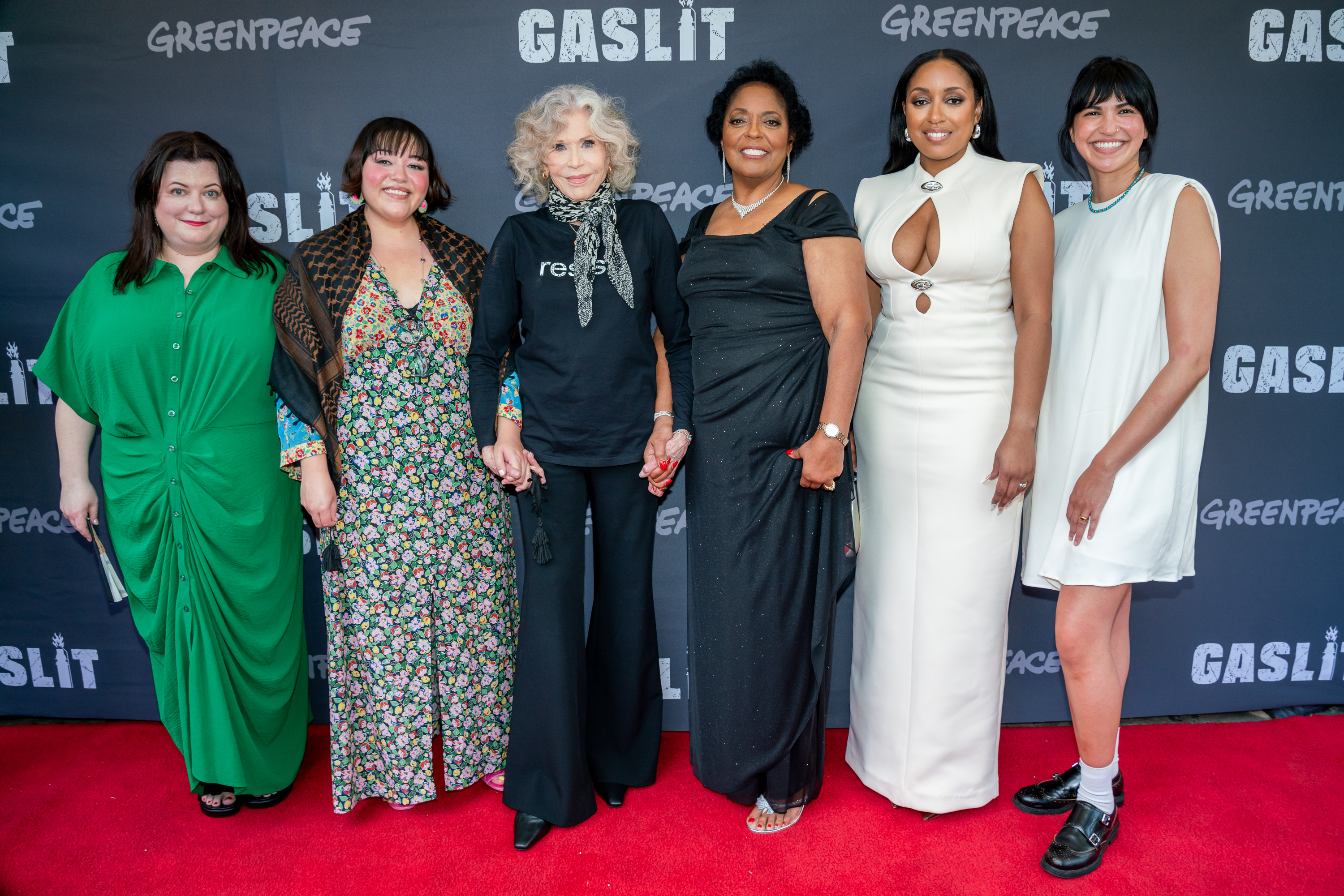
- Katie Camosy, Chloe Torres, Jane Fonda, Sharon Lavigne, Shamyra Lavigne, and Alana Schwartz attend the NY premiere of Gaslit at IFC Center
- Directed by: Katie Camosy
- Starring: Jane Fonda; Connie Britton; Maggie Rogers; Jo Banner
- Edited by: Laura Franco-Velasco
- Music by: Katy Jarzebowski
- Production company: Greenpeace USA
- Release date: February 5, 2026 (SBIFF)
- Running time: 115 minutes
- Country: United States
- Language: English

Gaslit is a 2026 American documentary film that follows Jane Fonda on a road trip through Texas and Louisiana to explore the impact of the fossil fuel industry. The film is directed by Katie Camosy. It was financed and produced by Greenpeace USA.
