= A Mosquito in the Ear =

2026 American drama film

- Theatrical release poster
- Directed by: Nicola Rinciari
- Screenplay by: Nicola Rinciari
- Based on: Una Zanzara nell'Orecchio by: Andrea Ferraris
- Produced by: Emily Dillard; Darren Dean; Ali Rizvi; Frank Hall Green; Stephen Stanley; Jomon Thomas; Sunitha Ram; Laurens C Postma
- Starring: Jake Lacy; Nazanin Boniadi; Ruhi Pal
- Cinematography: Kai Dickson
- Edited by: Devon Solwold
- Music by: Franco Piersanti
- Production companies: Spirit Pictures; 3DMC; Ratan Films; Lasutra Pictures; Whiskey Stream; Greenmachine Film; 5X Media; Foothill Productions
- Distributed by: Persimmon
- Release dates: February 4, 2026 (Santa Barbara); June 11, 2026 (United States)
- Running time: 90 minutes
- Countries: United States; India
- Languages: English; Hindi

A Mosquito in the Ear is a 2026 drama film written and directed by Nicola Rinciari in his directorial debut. It is based upon the graphic novel Una Zanzara nell’Orecchio by Andrea Ferraris. It stars Jake Lacy, Nazanin Boniadi and Ruhi Pal.

It had its world premiere at the 41st Santa Barbara International Film Festival on February 4, 2026, and was released in the United States on June 11, 2026, by Persimmon.

== Premise ==
After struggling with fertility issues, an American couple Andrew (Jake Lacy) and Daniela (Nazanin Boniadi) decides to pursue international adoption. They are matched with a 4-year-old girl named Sarvari (Ruhi Pal) and travel to an orphanage in Goa, India, to bring her home. Expecting a smooth, joyful transition, the couple is caught off guard when Sarvari refuses to leave the only home, community and language she has ever known. She is terrified of the unfamiliar adults who speak a language she cannot understand.

== Cast ==
- Jake Lacy as Andrew
- Nazanin Boniadi as Daniela
- Ruhi Pal as Sarvari
- Micky Singh as Sister Aruna

== Production ==
In May 2024, it was announced Jake Lacy, Nazanin Boniadi and Ruhi Pal had joined the cast of the film, with Nicola Rinciari directing from a screenplay he wrote, based upon the graphic novel Una Zanzara nell’Orecchio by Andrea Ferraris. Principal photography concluded in India.

== Release ==
It had its world premiere at the 41st Santa Barbara International Film Festival on February 4, 2026. In March 2026, Persimmon acquired U.S. distribution rights to the film. It is scheduled to be released on June 11, 2026.

A Mosquito in the Ear was an official selection of the Miami Film Festival, where it was nominated for the Jordan Ressler First Feature Award. The film later made its New York premiere as the Opening Night selection of the Brooklyn Film Festival on May 29, 2026.

== Reception ==
=== Critical reception ===
On the review aggregator website Rotten Tomatoes, 100% of 10 critics' reviews are positive, with an average rating of 7.9/10.
