= Loti Pencil =

Sculpture by Curtis Ingvoldstad in Minneapolis, MN, US

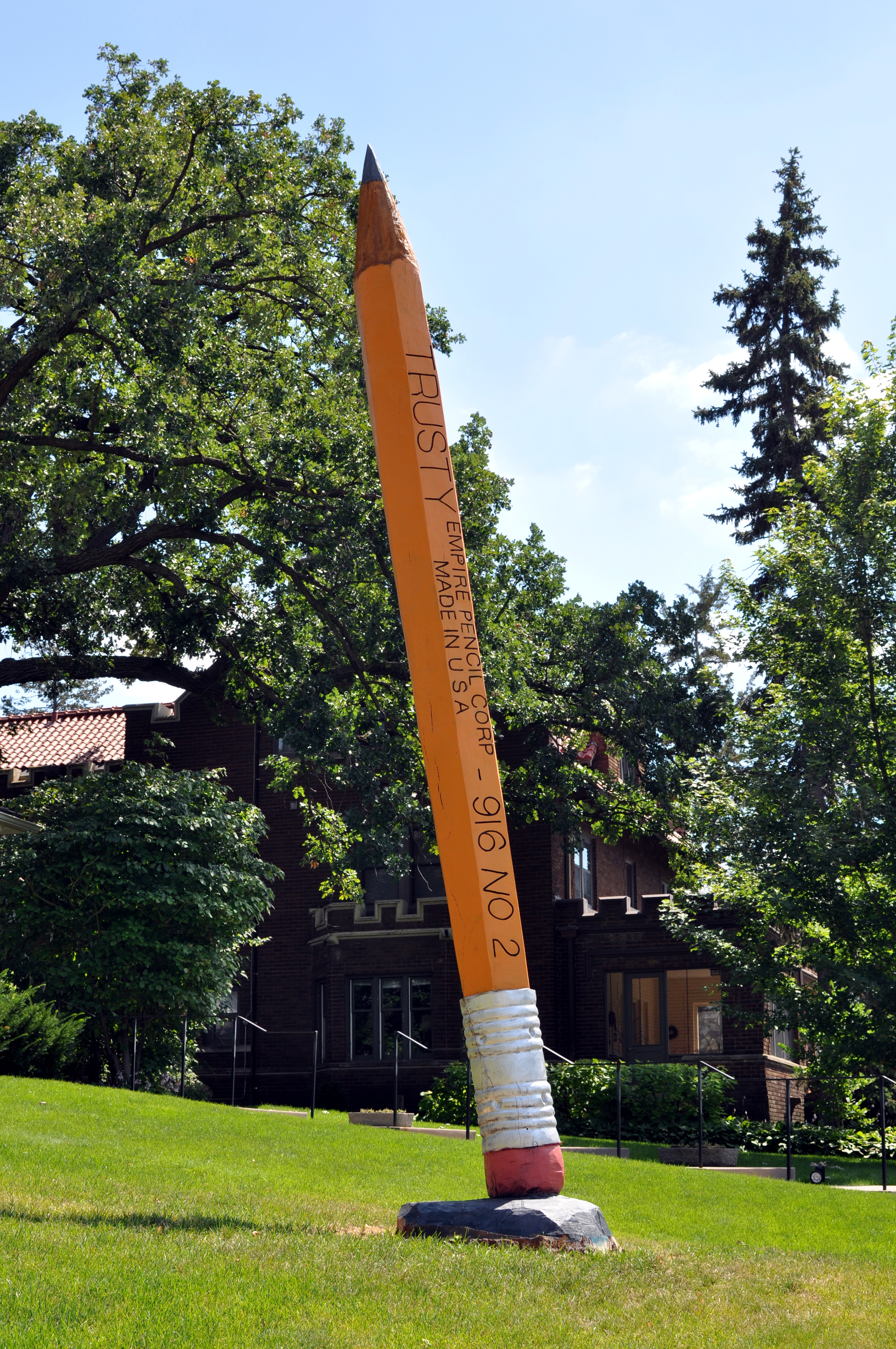
- The Loti Pencil in August 2022
- Artist: Curtis Ingvoldstad
- Completion date: June 4, 2022
- Medium: Wooden sculpture
- Subject: Pencil
- Dimensions: 610 cm (20 feet)
- Location: Minneapolis; 44°57′36.5″N 93°18′04.7″W
- Website: lotipencil.wordpress.com

The Loti Pencil or Lake of the Isles Pencil is a 20-foot (6.1 m) sculpture of a yellow Trusty Empire Pencil Corporation brand number 2 pencil sculpted by Curtis Ingvoldstad. Located on the front lawn of 2217 E Lake of the Isles Parkway near the Lake of the Isles in Minneapolis, it was sculpted in 2022 from the trunk of a 180-year-old bur oak tree whose crown was blown off in a 2017 storm.

Each year in June, a "sharpening" of the pencil is celebrated, during which the hosts use a giant 4-foot-tall, custom-made pencil sharpener on the pencil. The sharpener was designed by the same sculptor Ingvoldstad. With each sharpening, 3 to 10 inches (8 to 25 cm) are taken off the sculpture each year, with an eventual expected outcome of its reduction to a stub over the years. It is also decorated yearly for Halloween. The sculpture is one of several such landmarks in the city, such as the Spoonbridge and Cherry fountain, which is about a mile away. In 2026, it was the subject of the short documentary film A Short Documentary About a Giant Pencil.

== Background ==
In June 2017, by John Higgins' account at about 10 a.m. on a Saturday, a large 180-year-old bur oak tree, which stood on the front lawn of the home of John and Amy Higgins by the Lake of the Isles in Minneapolis, was heavily damaged in a storm. Strong winds twisted off the tree's crown, killing it and leaving it as a tall stump. A year or so following the height of the COVID-19 pandemic and the murder of George Floyd, after which John Higgins has said that "the community everywhere, every city needed something", the couple had an idea to create a sculpture out of the tree.

== History ==
=== 2022: Sculpting and inaugural "sharpening" ===
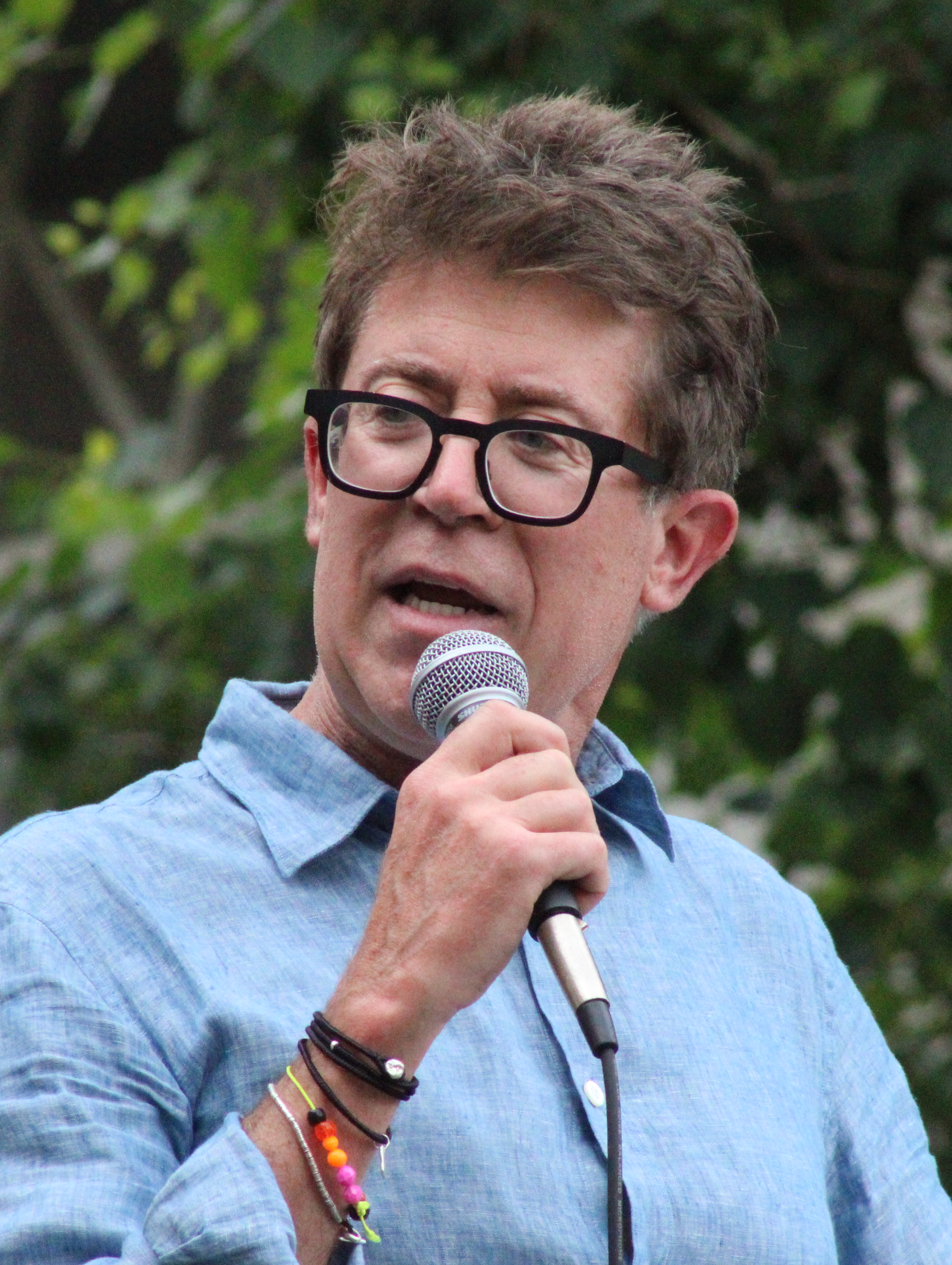
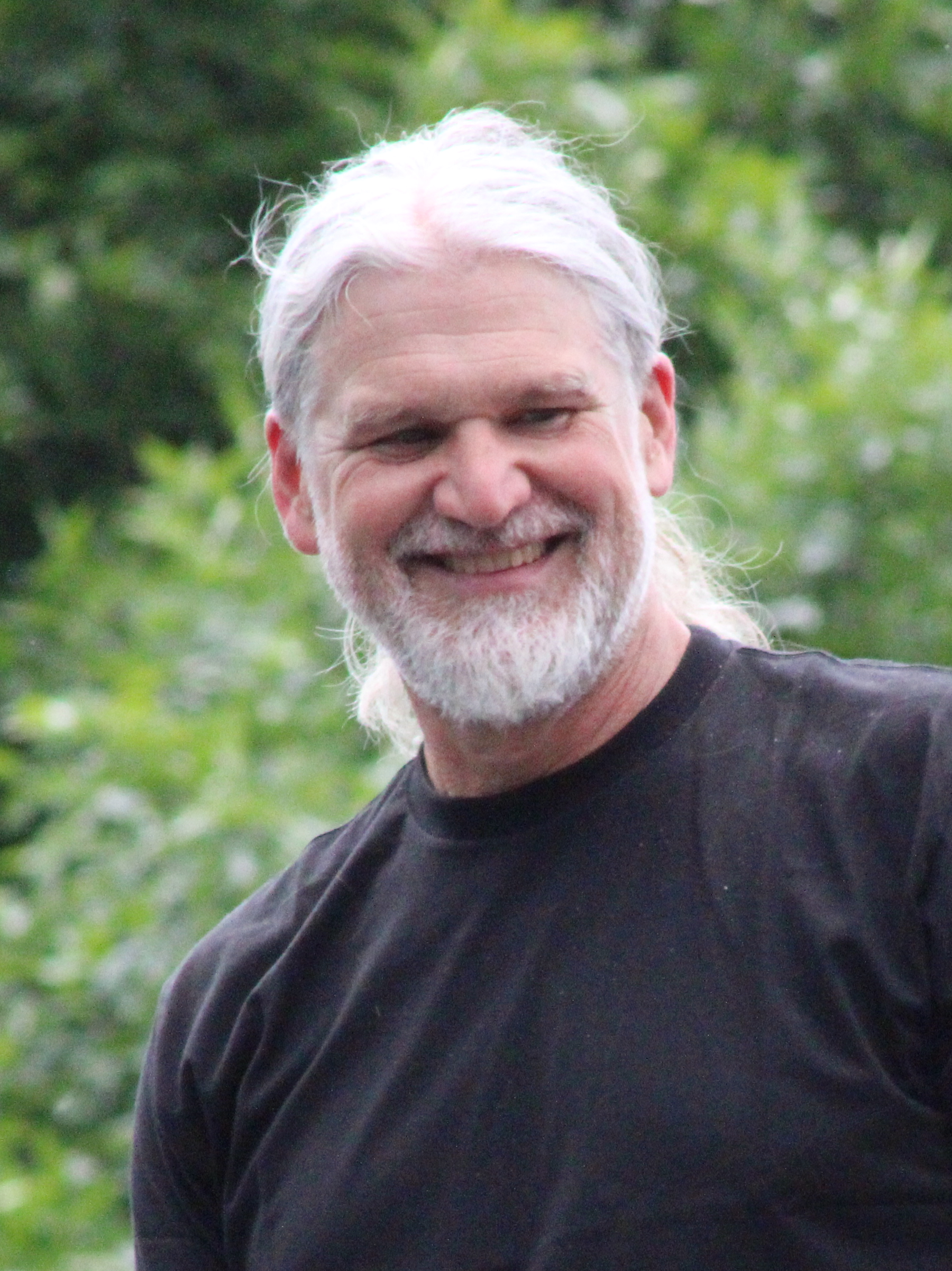
John (left) and Amy Higgins had the idea for the pencil, and Curtis Ingvoldstad (right) sculpted it.

The couple envisioned creating a recognizable piece of pop art out of the trunk, in a similar style to the work of Andy Warhol. Amy Higgins has said that the decision to make it into a pencil was because "Everybody knows a pencil. You see it in school, you see it in people’s work, or drawings, everything. So, it’s just so accessible to everybody, I think, and can easily mean something, and everyone can make what they want of it." Neighbors supported this change. They hired Curtis Ingvoldstad of Big Woods Sculpture to sculpt the pencil; he took months to do so, using a chainsaw. He carved "Trusty Empire Pencil Corp Made in U.S.A—916 No. 2." onto it; according to John Higgins, this brand was one of the first pencils to be brought to America. It was painted yellow with a ferrule and pink eraser as is traditional for these pencils, and was slightly tilted to stand out from the straight lines of the house. It measures 32 inches (81 cm) in diameter.

Plans were made to reveal it on June 4, 2022, with an inaugural "sharpening", intended to ceremonially remedy the dulling of the sculpture's sharp tip by the weather. They at first planned to sharpen it by a foot each year, for ten years in total. Its routine sharpening will intentionally lead to its reduction to a stub over several years. The unveiling drew hundreds of visitors, and a marching band and "human pencils" performed. "Professional pencil sharpener" David Rees flew in from New York to celebrate its unveiling and perform the first sharpening. Following this debut, John Higgins said that 50 to 200 people had come to visit the pencil per day, amounting to tens of thousands of viewers in its first year.

=== 2023–present: Subsequent "sharpenings" and other events ===
The "No. 2 Sharpening" was scheduled for June 3, 2023 and was to feature a live trivia contest, giveaways, and drum and bugle corps. Plans were made to shave the pencil by 3 to 4 inches (8 to 10 cm); Ingvoldstad carved a 4-foot-long (1.2 m) handheld pencil sharpener weighing over 100 pounds (45 kg) to conduct the sharpening ceremony.

Though the 2024 sharpening event was shortened due to the weather, hundreds of people attended. East Isles Neighborhood Association president Mike Erlandson had a speech delivered on a scroll via barristers and proclaimed June 15 "Lake of the Pencil Day."

Further events have taken place concerning the Loti Pencil aside from the "sharpenings", including annual Halloween costumes for the sculpture and holiday lights displays. For Halloween 2024, the pencil was dressed as Superman.

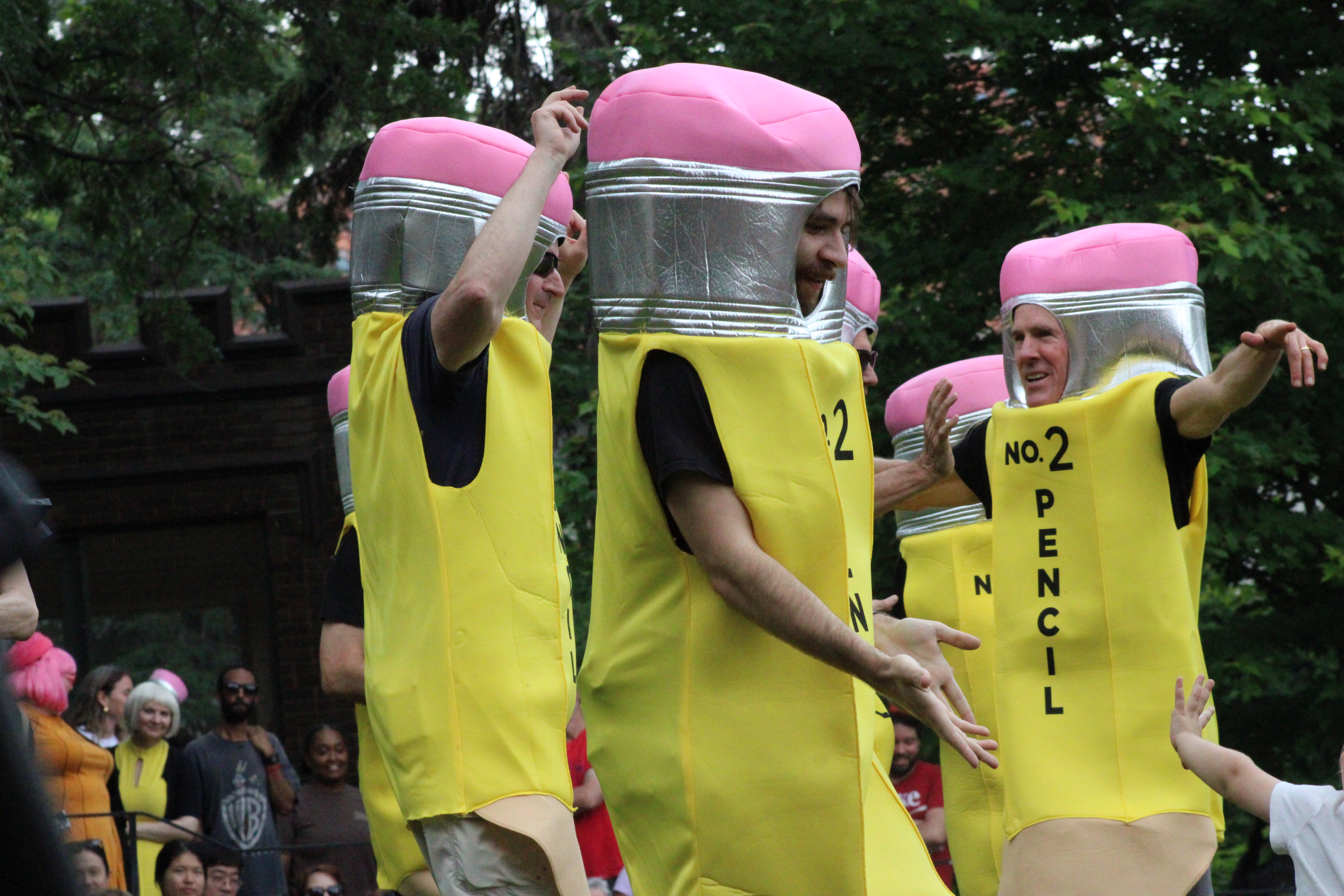
Pencil costumes were worn at the 4th annual sharpening

The fourth sharpening in 2025 was attended by over 1,000 people according to the Associated Press, and by over 2,000 by the estimation of the Minnesota Star Tribune. Some attendees dressed as pencils or erasers. Two Swiss alphorn players provided entertainment, and the hosts handed out purple pencils in commemoration of late musician Prince's 67th birthday. Mayor Jacob Frey attended and danced on the lawn. For Halloween 2025, the pencil was dressed in a 4XL-sized number 18 Minnesota Vikings jersey with a helmet through which the pencil tip poked, large gold chains, a mouth grill, shoulder pads, and large white pants as well as tube socks with purple stripes, in tribute to Vikings wide receiver Justin Jefferson.

In January 2026, it was announced that a film directed by Daniel Straub named A Short Documentary About A Giant Pencil would premiere at the Santa Barbara International Film Festival. The film won Best Short Documentary at the festival. It premiered at the Minneapolis–Saint Paul International Film Festival in April that year.

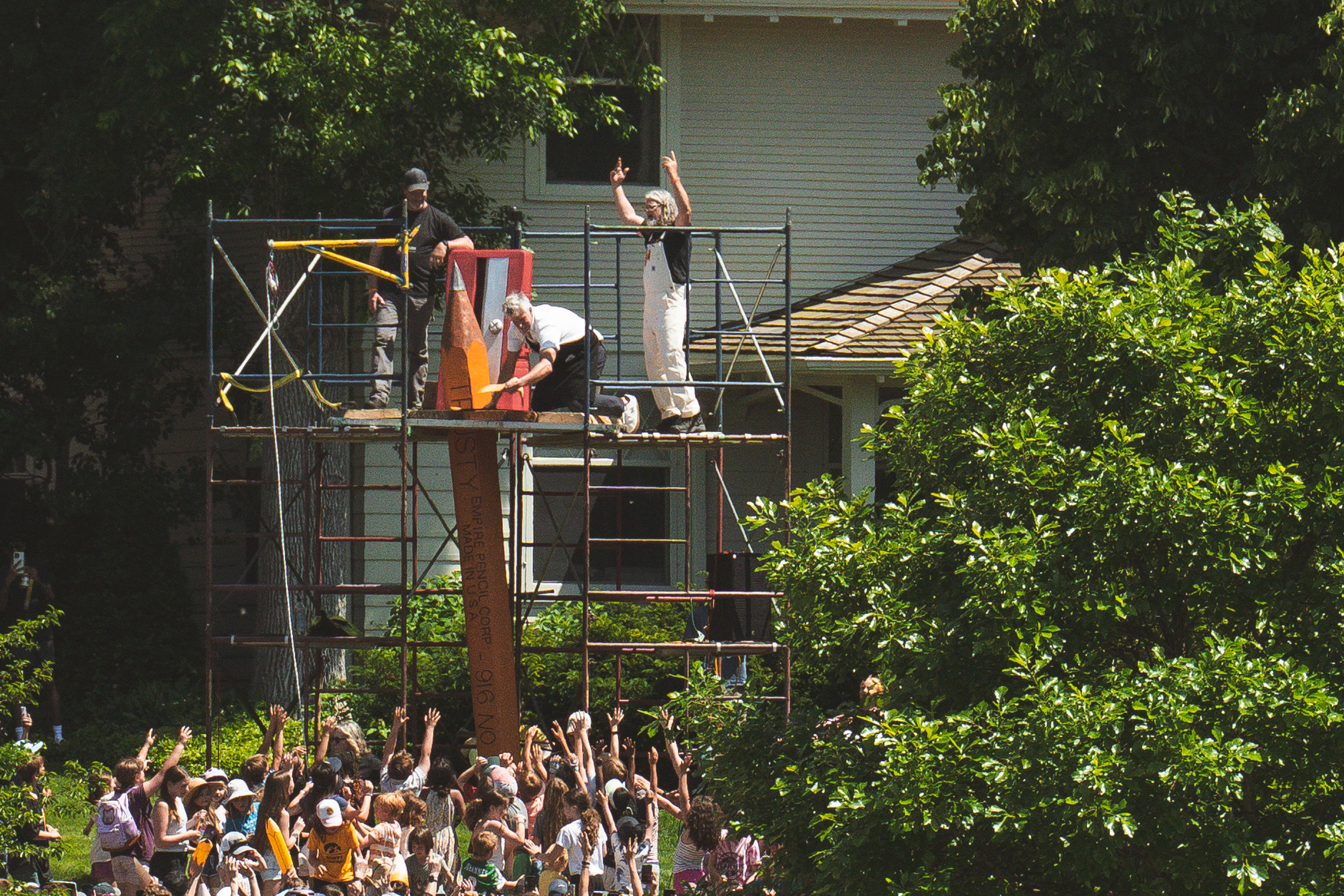
Ingvoldstad (right) and others celebrate the 5th Annual Sharpening in 2026

The fifth sharpening took place on June 6, 2026 with an audience of thousands, this time soundtracked by University of Minnesota Pep Band and DJ Jake Rudh. David Rees again attended. People used kayaks to watch from the lake. Ingvoldstad noted that year that they had shaved off less of the sculpture each year in an effort to preserve the text on the pencil for as long as they could, and that "When we start getting down to the lettering, it’ll start changing dramatically".

== Meaning ==
Ingvoldstad has stated of the work that "people interpret this however they want to. They should. They should come to this and find whatever they want out of it." On the yearly sharpening ritual, he has said that "Like any ritual, you’ve got to sacrifice something, so we’re sacrificing part of the monumentality of the pencil, so that we can give that to the audience that comes, and say, 'This is our offering to you, and in goodwill to all the things that you’ve done this year.'"

== In popular culture ==
The sculpture is the subject of the 2026 short documentary film A Short Documentary About A Giant Pencil, directed by Daniel Straub. The film features interviews with homeowners John and Amy Higgins and sculptor Curtis Ingvoldstad, and it documents the community tradition of the annual "sharpening" ceremony. The documentary premiered at the 41st Santa Barbara International Film Festival, where it won the award for Best Documentary Short Film.

== Gallery ==
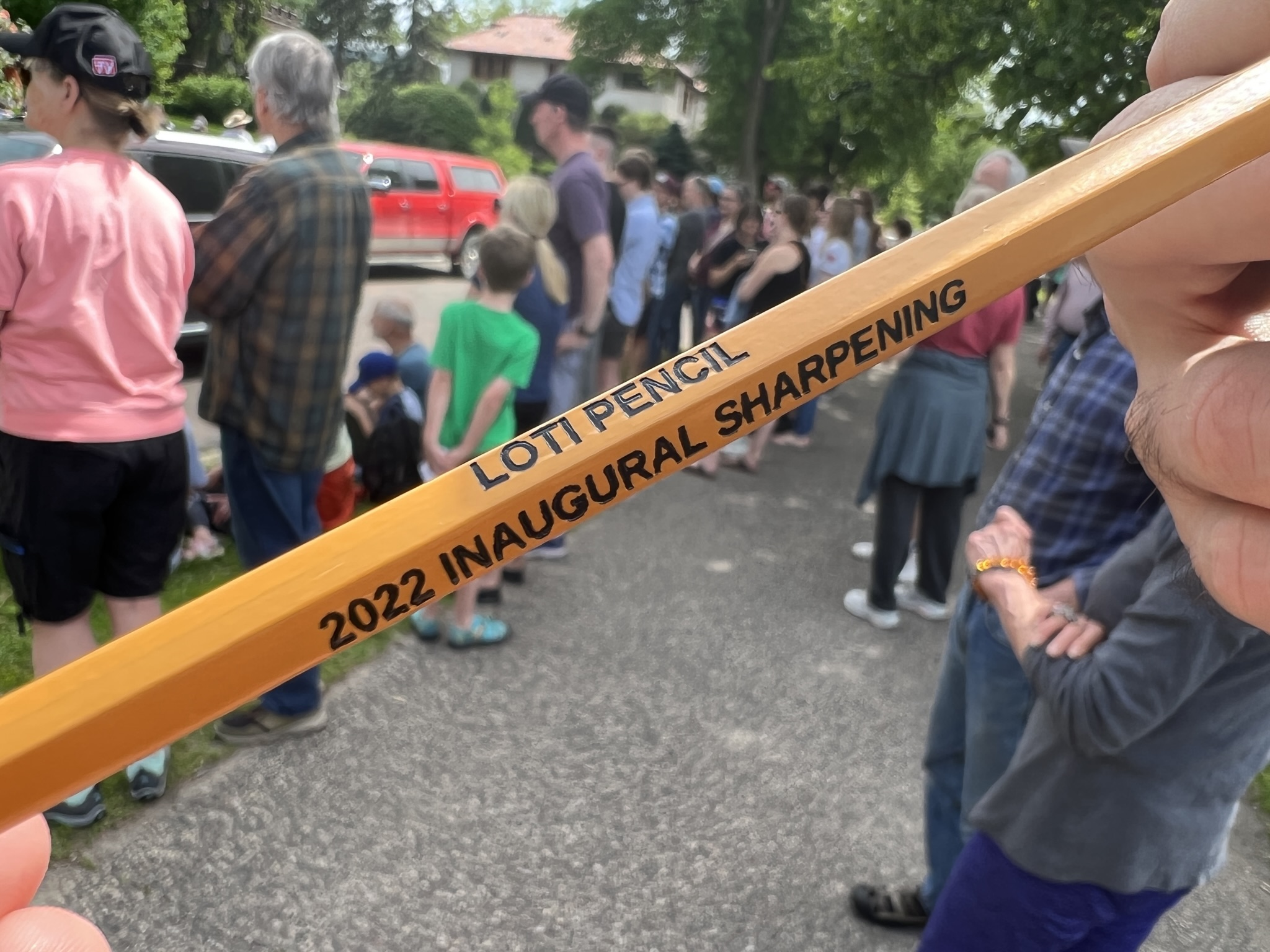
Commemorative pencils were given out at the inaugural sharpening

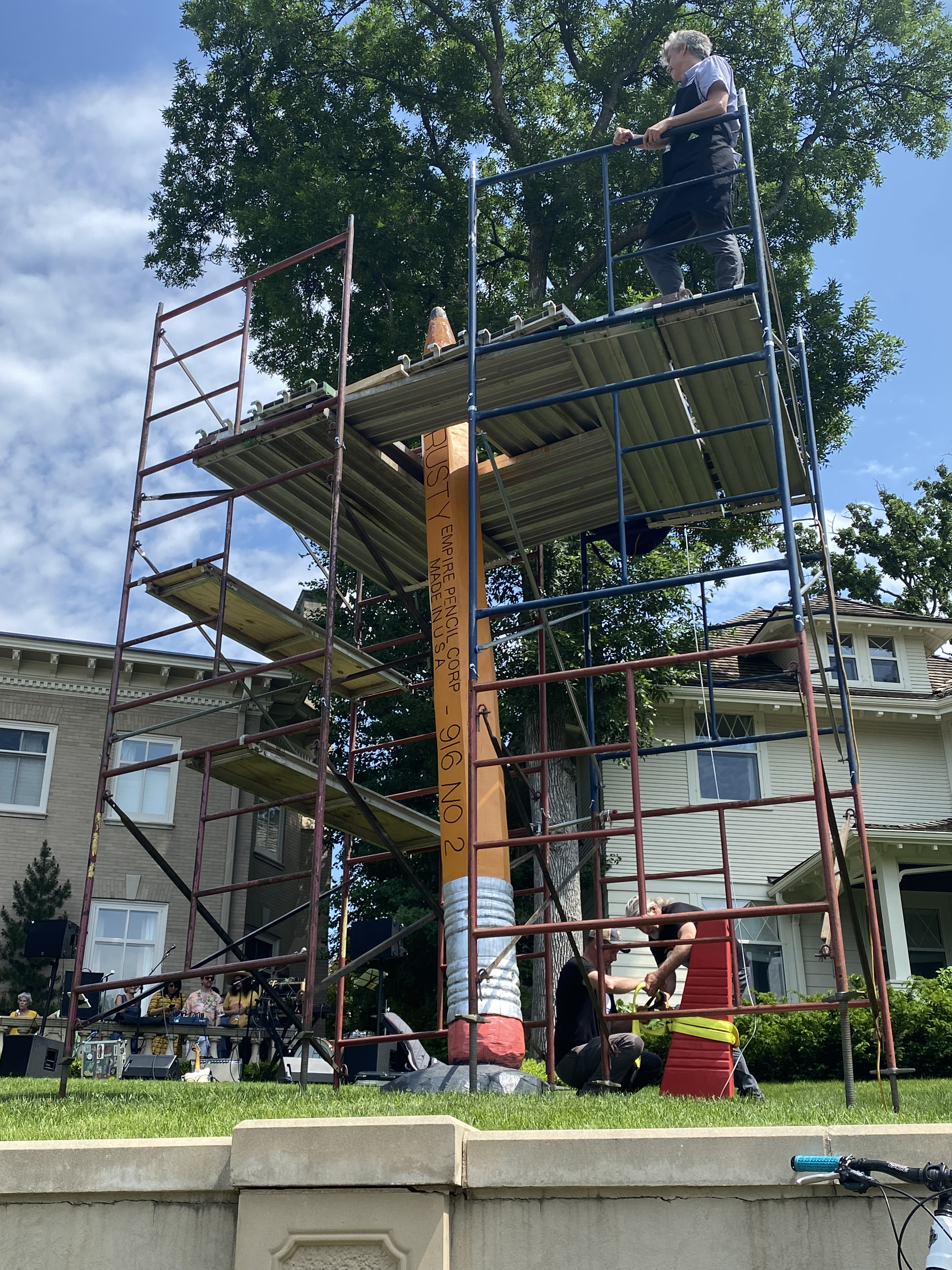
Sharpenings are done using a scaffold

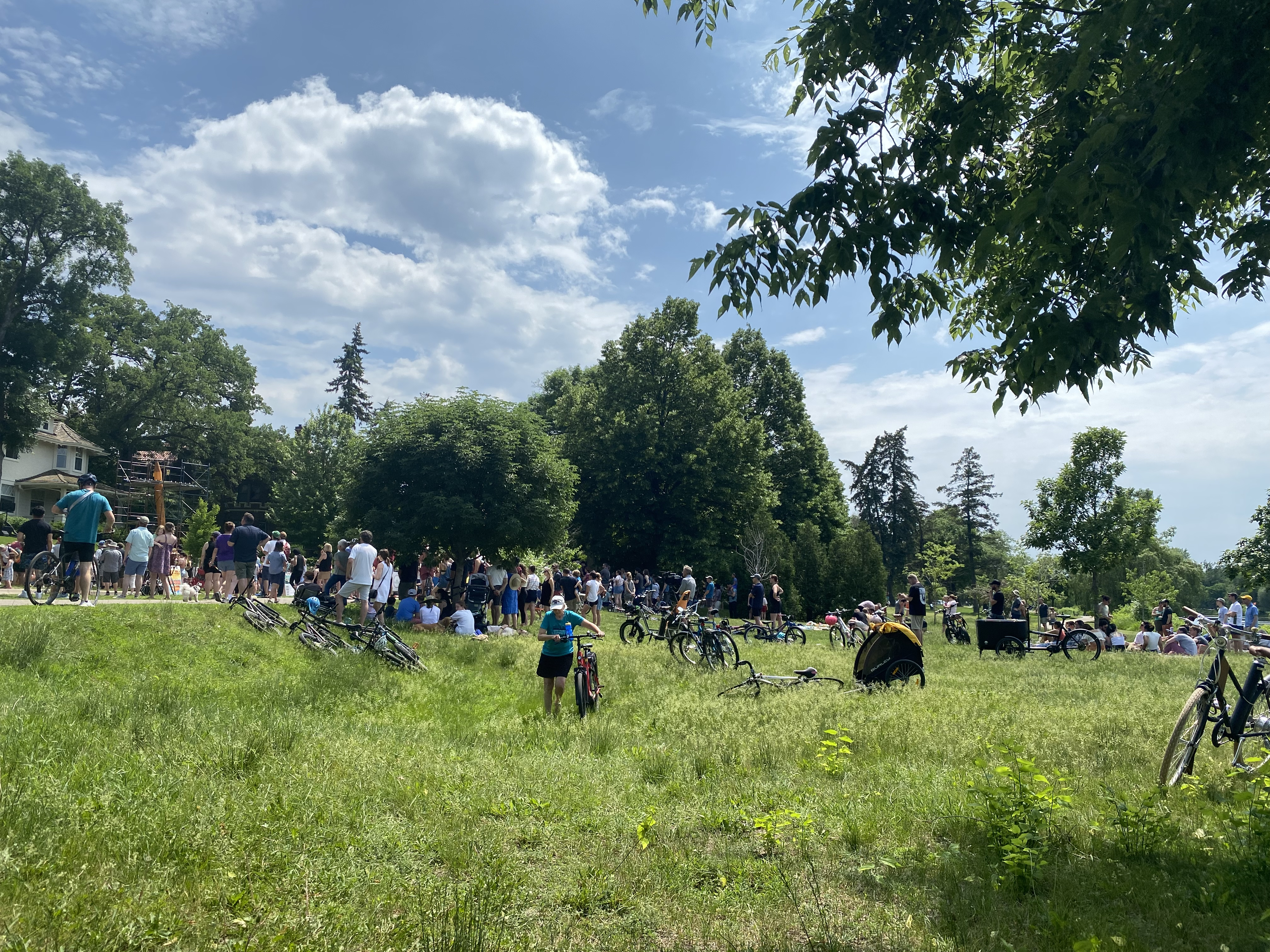
Bicycles at the 2nd sharpening

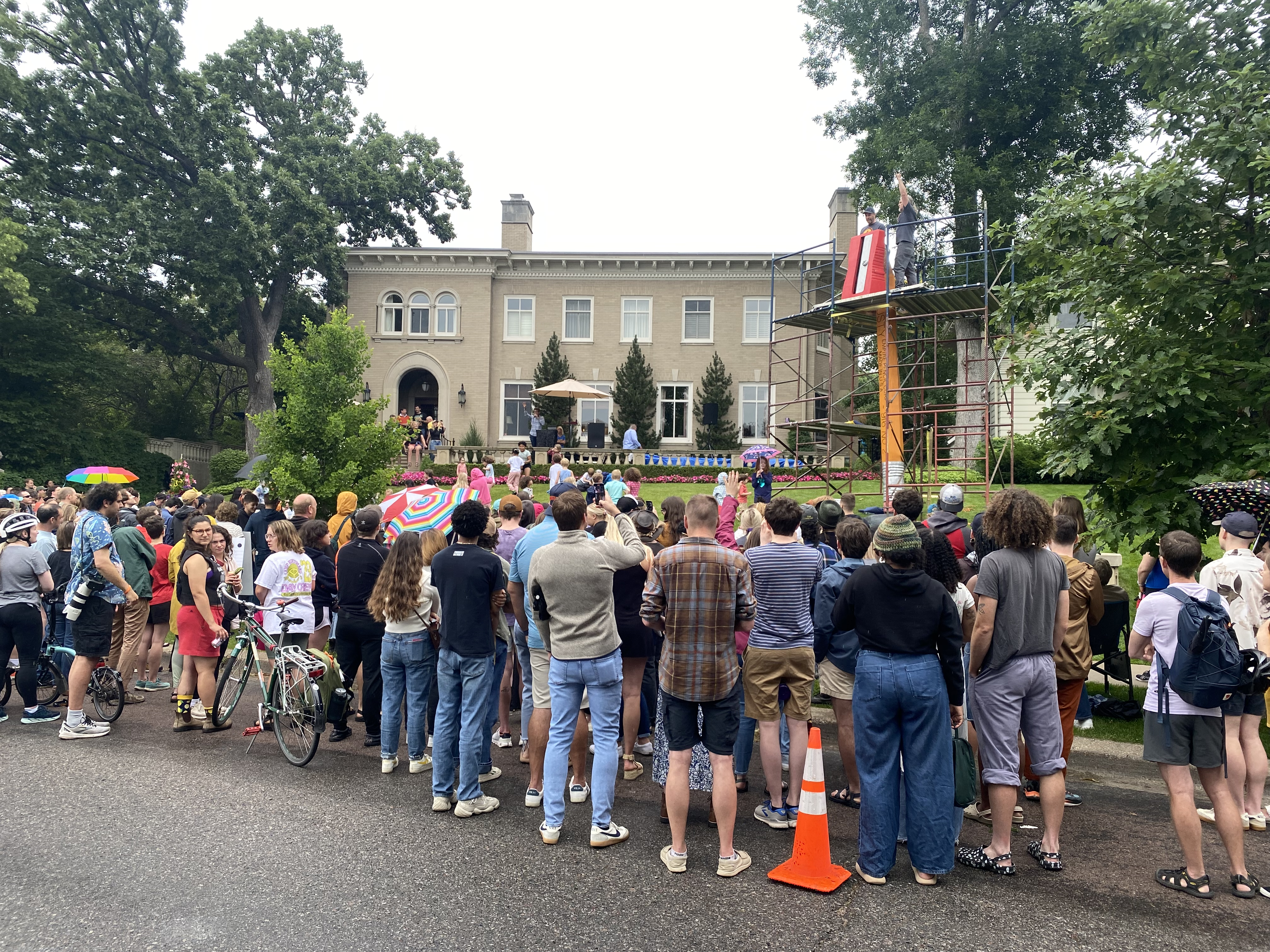
Crowds at the 3rd sharpening

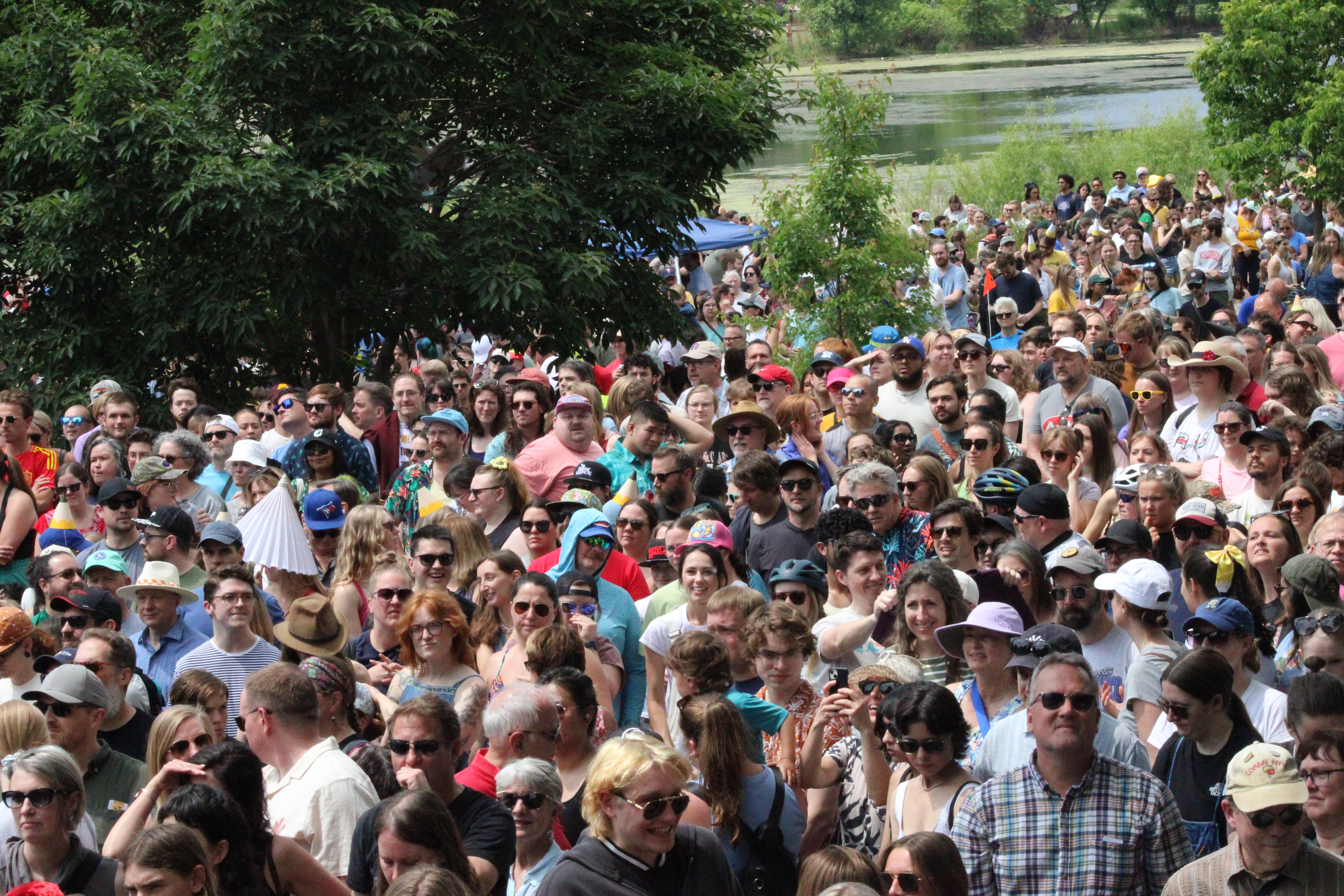
Crowds grew significantly at the 4th sharpening

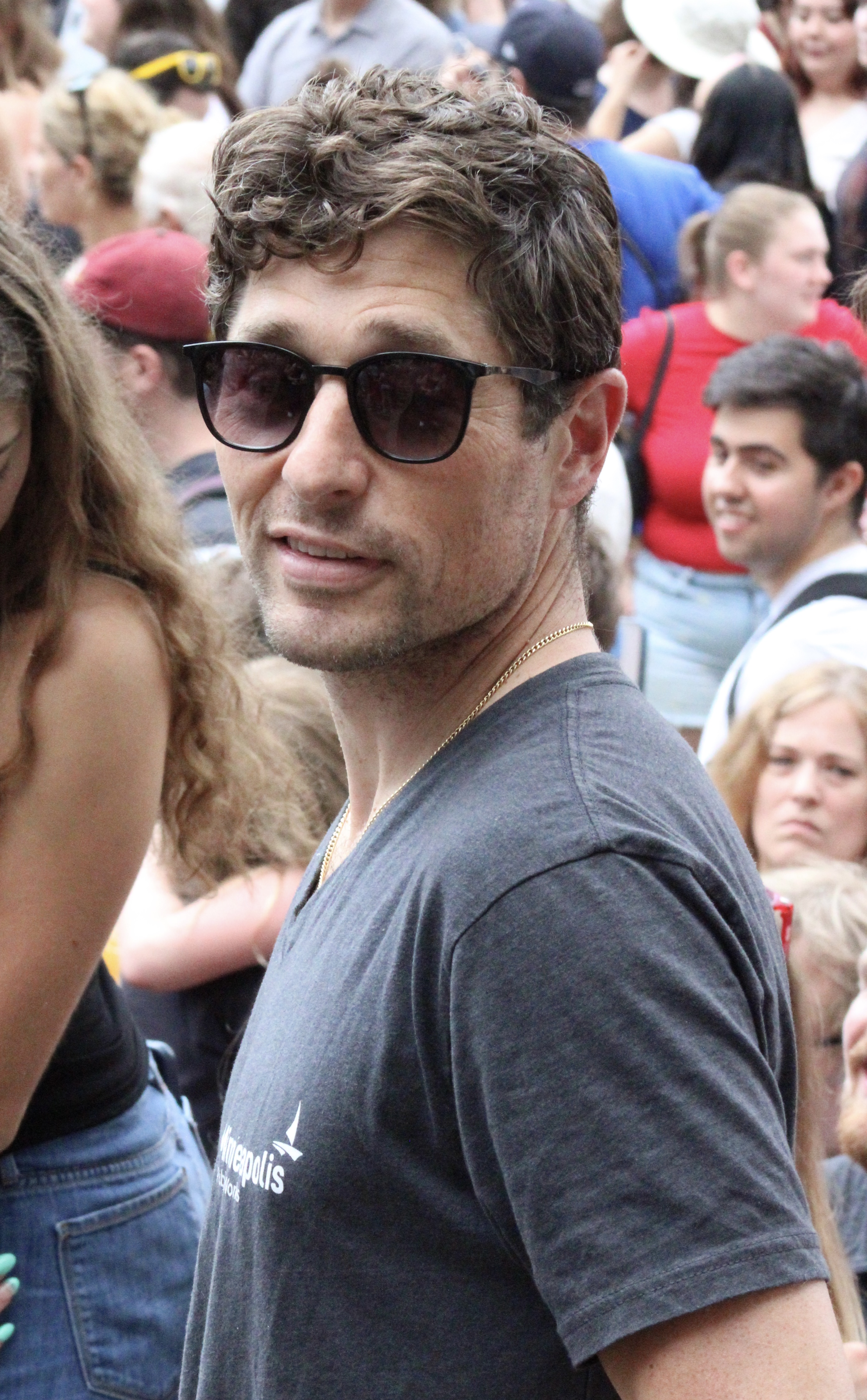
Mayor Jacob Frey at the 4th sharpening

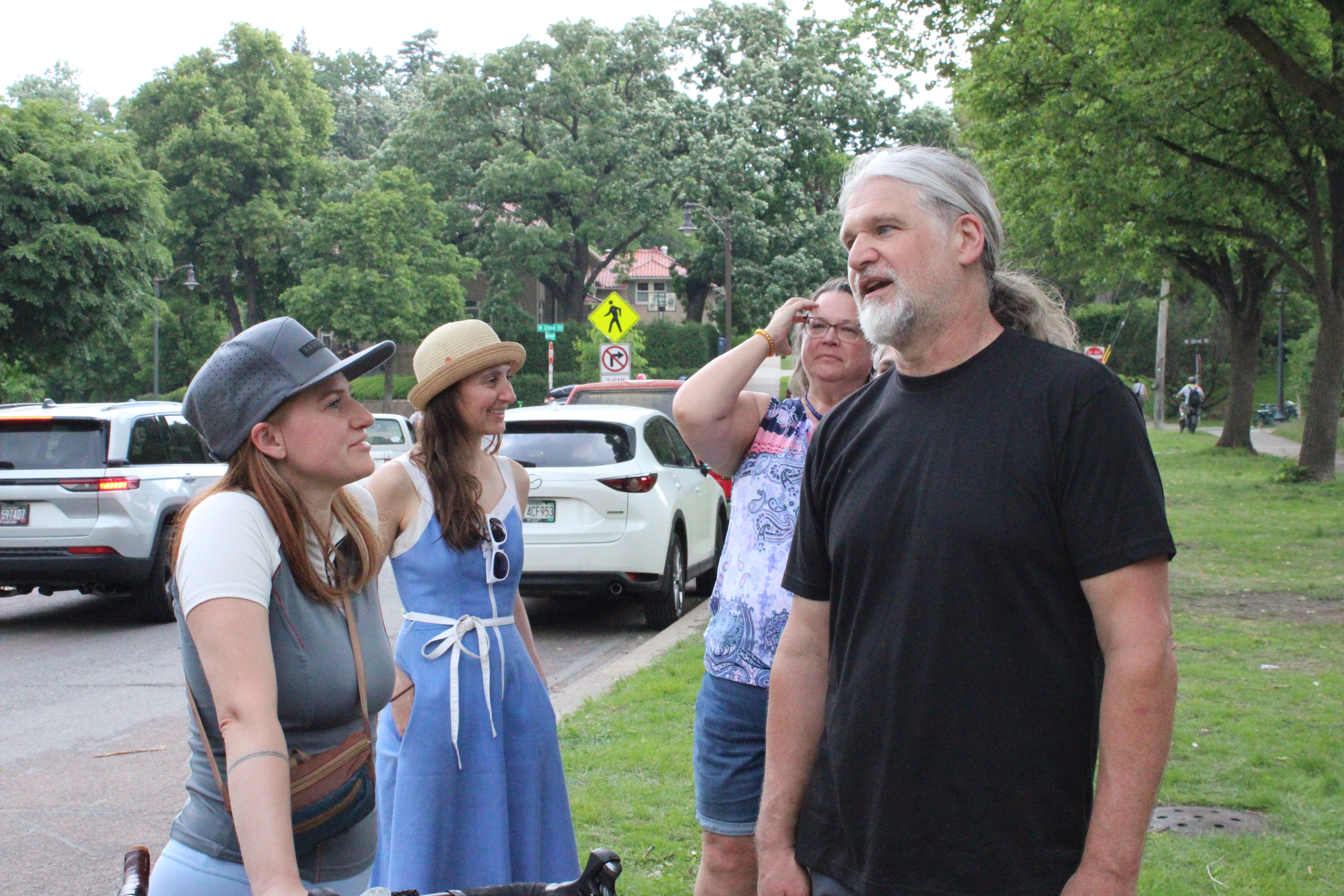
Politicians Katie Cashman and Katie Jones were at the 4th sharpening

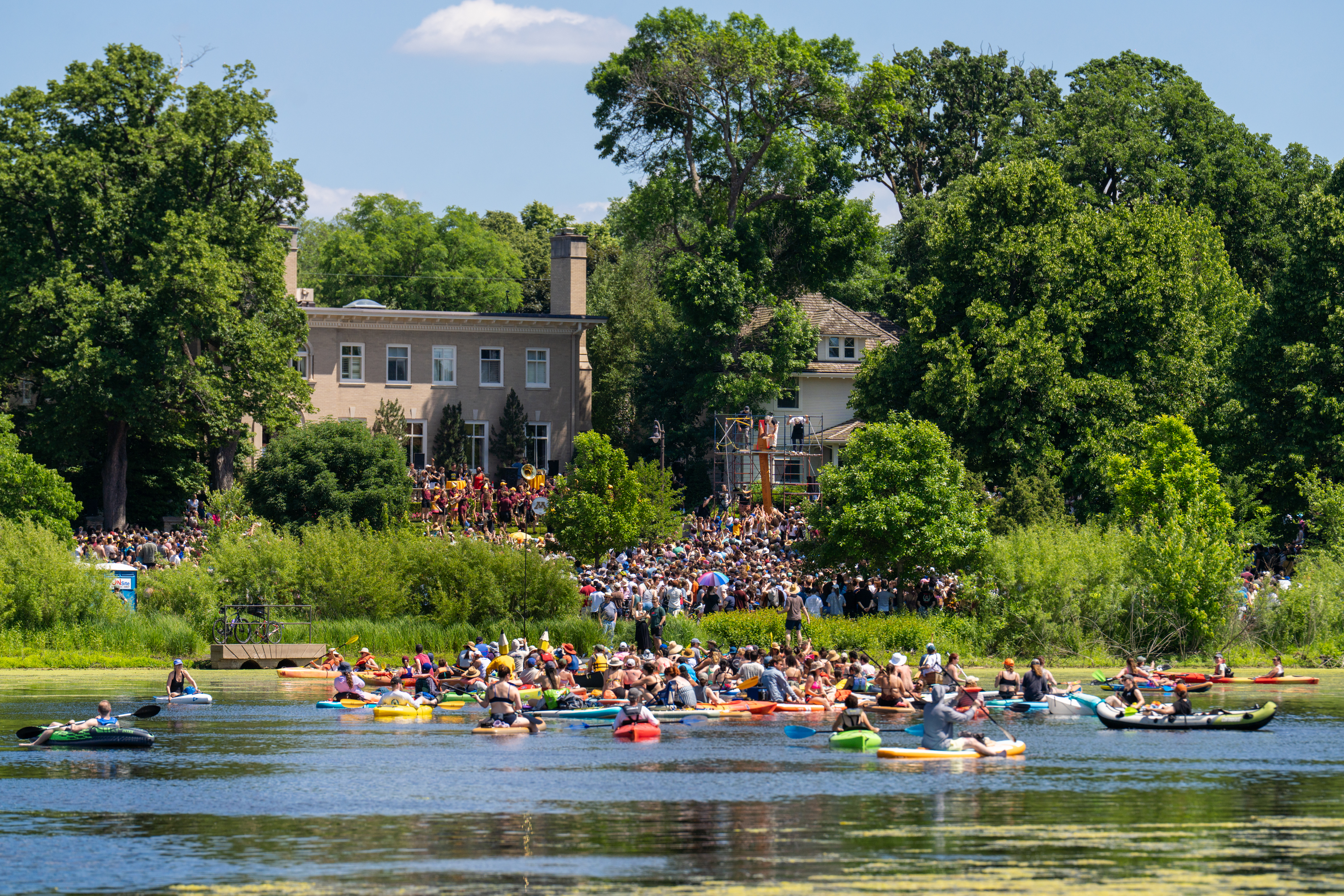
People used kayaks to watch from the lake at the 5th sharpening
