= Laundry (film) =

2025 South African drama film

- Official poster
- Zulu: Uhlanjululo
- Directed by: Zamo Mkhwanazi
- Written by: Zamo Mkhwanazi
- Produced by: Philippe Coeytaux; Zamo Mkhwanazi; Jim Stark
- Starring: Tracy September; Ntobeko Sishi; Zekhethelo Zondi; Siyabonga Shibe; Bukamina Cebekhulu
- Cinematography: Gabriel Lobos
- Edited by: Christine Hoffet
- Music by: Tracy September
- Production companies: Akka Films; Kude Media; Mojo Entertainment LLC
- Release date: 5 September 2025 (TIFF)
- Running time: 106 minutes
- Countries: South Africa; Switzerland
- Language: Zulu

Laundry (Zulu: Uhlanjululo) is a 2025 drama film written and directed by Zamo Mkhwanazi in her debut feature. The film depicts a young man's aspirations as a musician in apartheid South Africa, clashing with preserving his family's laundry business amid intensifying racial discrimination against Black entrepreneurs.

The international co-production between Switzerland, and South Africa, had its world premiere on 5 September 2025 in the Discovery section at the 2025 Toronto International Film Festival. It was also selected at the 41st Santa Barbara International Film Festival, where it closed the festival on February 14, 2026.

== Synopsis ==
Set in Johannesburg in 1968, the story follows Khuthala, a young man reluctant to inherit his father’s laundry business. As apartheid-era restrictions intensify and Black-owned enterprises come under threat, he finds himself caught between his aspiration to become a musician and the need to protect the family’s only source of income and stability.

== Cast ==
- Tracy September as Lilian
- Ntobeko Sishi as Khuthala
- Zekhethelo Zondi as Ntombenhle
- Siyabonga Shibe as Enoch
- Bukamina Cebekhulu as Magda

== Production ==
In October 2024, the film was selected for the Atlas Workshops at the Marrakech International Film Festival. Jeff Nichols, American film director and screenwriter mentored the directors at Atlas Workshops + Project Line-Up.

== Release ==
Laundry had its world premiere at the 2025 Toronto International Film Festival on 5 September 2025 in Discovery section. On 22 November 2025, it competed at the Marrakech International Film Festival in the official competition.

The film was also selected for the Audience Award Competition at the 61st edition of the Solothurn Film Festival and was screened on 22 January 2026.

It was selected as closing film of 41st Santa Barbara International Film Festival and screened on 14 February 2026.

It opened the Joburg Film Festival on 3 March 2026.

It was screened at the Oldenburg International Film Festival on 18 September 2026.

== Accolades ==
Award	Date of ceremony	Category	Recipient(s)	Result	Ref.
Solothurn Film Festival	28 January 2026	Audience Award	Laundry	Nominated	
