= 41st Santa Barbara International Film Festival =

2026 edition of SBIFF

- Official poster
- Opening film: A Mosquito in the Ear by Nicola Rinciari
- Closing film: Laundry (Uhlanjululo) by Zamo Mkhwanazi
- Location: Santa Barbara, California, United States
- Founded: 1986
- Awards: American Riviera Award: Ethan Hawke; Arlington Artist of the Year: Kate Hudson; Kirk Douglas Award: Cynthia Erivo; Maltin Modern Master Award: Adam Sandler; Montecito Award: Stellan Skarsgård; Outstanding Performer of the Year Award: Michael B. Jordan
- Hosted by: Santa Barbara International Film Festival (organization)
- Artistic director: Claudia Puig
- Festival date: Opening: 4 February 2026; Closing: 14 February 2026
- Website: SBIFF

Santa Barbara International Film Festival
- 2027 2025

The 41st Santa Barbara International Film Festival, the 2026 edition of the Santa Barbara International Film Festival, took place from February 4 to February 14, 2026, at Santa Barbara, California, United States. In August, October and November 2025, honorary award recipients were revealed: the Kirk Douglas Award for Excellence in Film was awarded to Cynthia Erivo (for Wicked: For Good), the Maltin Modern Master Award was awarded to Adam Sandler (for Jay Kelly), and the Outstanding Performer of the Year Award was awarded to Michael B. Jordan (for Sinners).

On October 30, 2025, the Virtuosos Award recipients were revealed, which were awarded to Jacob Elordi (for Frankenstein), Chase Infiniti (for One Battle After Another), Amy Madigan (for Weapons), Wagner Moura (for The Secret Agent), Renate Reinsve (for Sentimental Value), Sydney Sweeney (for Christy), Teyana Taylor (for One Battle After Another), and Jeremy Allen White (for Springsteen: Deliver Me from Nowhere). On January 31, 2026, Inga Ibsdotter Lilleaas (for Sentimental Value) and Wunmi Mosaku (for Sinners) were added to the lineup of Virtuosos Award recipients. Additionally, the Montecito Award was awarded to Swedish actor Stellan Skarsgård for his performance in Sentimental Value.

In January 2026, One Battle After Another trio Benicio del Toro, Leonardo DiCaprio, and Sean Penn were revealed as the recipients of the Hammond Cinema Vanguard Award. Moreover, Kate Hudson (for Song Sung Blue) was named Arlington Artist of the Year and Ethan Hawke (for Blue Moon) was revealed as the recipient of the American Riviera Award.

== Overview ==
From February 6 to February 10, Julian Schnabel was feted with a hosted retrospective of his films.

- February 6: The Diving Bell and the Butterfly
- February 7: At Eternity's Gate
- February 8: Basquiat
- February 9: Before Night Falls
- February 10: In the Hand of Dante (followed by Q&A)

From February 11 to February 14, Jessie Buckley was feted with a hosted retrospective of her films.

- February 11: Hamnet (followed by Q&A)
- February 14: Wild Rose and The Lost Daughter

=== Opening and closing nights ===
On February 4, the festival opened with the film A Mosquito in the Ear, an American drama written and directed by Nicola Rinciari (his directorial debut); it is based upon the graphic novel Una Zanzara nell'Orecchio by Andrea Ferraris.

On February 14, the festival closed with the film Laundry (Uhlanjululo), a South African drama written and directed by Zamo Mkhwanazi (another directorial debut).

== Official selection ==
The festival presented 46 world premieres and 80 United States premieres from 50 countries with half of the films directed by women.

=== Opening and closing films ===
The festival opened with Nicola Rinciari's A Mosquito in the Ear and closed with Zamo Mkhwanazi's Laundry (Uhlanjululo).

English title	Original title	Director	Production countrie(s)
Opening film
A Mosquito in the Ear		Nicola Rinciari	India, United States
Closing film
Laundry	Uhlanjululo	Zamo Mkhwanazi	South Africa, Switzerland

=== Feature films ===
- Ablaze (Les Braises), Thomas Kruithof (France)
- Abril, Hernán Jiménez (Costa Rica)
- Adam's Sake (L'intérêt d'Adam), Laura Wandel (Belgium, France)
- Aki, Darlene Naponse (Canada)
- All of the Above, Allison Walsh (United States)
- American Pachuco: The Legend of Luis Valdez, David Alvarado (United States)
- The Art of Adventure, Alison Reid (Canada)
- Artists in Residence, Katie Jacobs (United States)
- ASCO: Without Permission, Travis Gutiérrez Senger (United States)
- The Big Cheese, Sara Joe Wolansky (United States)
- Blood Lines, Gail Maurice (Canada)
- Bookends, Mike Doyle (United States)
- Broken Voices, Ondřej Provazník (Czech Republic, Slovakia)
- California Scenario, James Takata (United States)
- The Cost of Heaven (Gagne ton ciel), Mathieu Denis (Canada)
- A Cowboy in London, Jared L. Christopher (United States)
- Cuba & Alaska, Yegor Troyanovsky (Ukraine, France, Belgium)
- Dear Lara, Lara St. John (Canada, United States)
- Death and Life Madalena (Morte e Vida Madalena), Guto Parente (Brazil, Portugal)
- Diya, Achille Ronaimou (Chad)
- Don't Call Me Mama (Se meg), Nina Knag (Norway)
- Eternal Stoke, Joshua Pomer (United States)
- The Eyes of Ghana, Ben Proudfoot (United States)
- Father's Day (La Fête des Pères), Ayana O'Shun (Canada)
- The Fisherman, Zoey Martinson (Ghana)
- The Gas Station Attendant, Karla Murthy (United States)
- Gaslit, Katie Camosy (United States)
- The Heart Is a Muscle, Imran Hamdulay (South Africa, Saudi Arabia)
- Holy Days, Nathalie Boltt (Canada, New Zealand)
- I Swear, Kirk Jones (United Kingdom)
- If These Walls Could Rock, Tyler Measom and Craig A. Williams (United States)
- Imbalance, Dale Griffiths Stamos (United States)
- In the Hand of Dante, Julian Schnabel (United States, Italy)
- In the Land of Arto (Le Pays d'Arto), Tamara Stepanyan (France, Armenia)
- In the Room, Brishkay Ahmed (Canada)
- The Incredible Snow Woman (L' Incroyable femme des neiges), Sébastien Betbeder (France)
- Irkalla: Gilgamesh's Dream (Irkalla Hulm Jijiljamish), Mohamed Al-Daradji (Iraq, United Arab Emirates, Qatar, France, United Kingdom, Saudi Arabia)
- Kim Novak's Vertigo, Alexandre O. Philippe (United States)
- The Last Picture Shows, Rustin Thompson (United States)
- Laundry (Uhlanjululo), Zamo Mkhwanazi (South Africa)
- Let Me Paint My World for You (Ich male dir meine Welt), Andrea Christina Furrer (Germany, Switzerland)
- Life After Siham (La Vie après Siham), Namir Abdel Messeeh (France, Egypt)
- A Life Illuminated, Tasha Van Zandt (United States)
- Little Lorraine, Andy Hines (Canada)
- Los Tigres, Alberto Rodríguez Librero (Spain)
- Lost Land (Harà Watan), Akio Fujimoto (Japan, France, Malaysia, Germany)
- Lovely Day (Mille secrets mille dangers), Philippe Falardeau (Canada)
- The Luminous Life (A Vida Luminosa), João Rosas (Portugal, France)
- Maturity (L'Âge mûr), Jean-Benoît Ugeux (Belgium)
- Maysoon, Nancy Biniadaki (Germany, Greece)
- Mockbuster, Anthony Frith (Australia, United States)
- Mortician, Abdolreza Kahani (Canada)
- A Mosquito in the Ear, Nicola Rinciari (India, Italy, United States)
- No Mercy, Isa Willinger (Germany, Austria)
- No Ordinary Heist, Colin McIvor (Ireland)
- Nomad Shadow (Thal Badaoui), Eimi Imanishi (United States, Spain, France)
- Not Made for Politics (Süsteemist väljas), Volia Chajkouskaya (Estonia)
- Notes of a True Criminal (Zapiski nastoyashego prestupnika), Alexander Rodnyansky and Andriy Alferov (Ukraine, United States)
- Occupational Hazard: The First Coral Reefers, John H. Cunningham (United States)
- On the End, Ari Selinger (United States)
- The Ozu Diaries, Daniel Raim (United States)
- A Pale View of Hills, Kei Ishikawa (Japan, United Kingdom, Poland)
- Perla, Alexandra Makárová (Austria, Slovakia)
- Peter Asher: Everywhere Man, Dayna Goldfine and Dan Geller (United States)
- Relatively Normal, Amy Wendel (United States)
- Rising Through the Fray, Courtney Montour (Canada)
- Saipan, Lisa Barros D'Sa and Glenn Leyburn (Ireland)
- Sanatorium, Gar O'Rourke (Ireland, Ukraine)
- Saving Etting Street, Dena Fisher and Amy Scott (United States)
- Sell Your House, Eric Foss and Brandon Pickering (United States)
- Shakti, Nani Sahra Walker (United States, Nepal)
- Silent Rebellion (À bras-le-corps), Marie-Elsa Sgualdo (Switzerland, Belgium, France)
- Silent Struggle (En silencio. La resiliencia de Isco Alarcón), Sara Sálamo (Spain)
- Sophia, Dhafer L'Abidine (Tunisia, United Arab Emirates, United Kingdom)
- Space Cadet, Kid Koala (Canada)
- Stand By, Mother, Kerrilee Gore (United States)
- Steal Away, Clement Virgo (Canada, Belgium)
- Steal This Story, Please!, Tia Lessin and Carl Deal (United States)
- Sunshine Express, Amirali Navaee (Iran, Sweden)
- Sweet Störy, Sarah Justine Kerruish and Matt Maude (Sweden, United States)
- The Six Billion Dollar Man, Eugene Jarecki (United States)
- Tenor – My Name is Pati, Rebecca Tansley (New Zealand)
- There Are No Words, Min Sook Lee (Canada)
- This Is Not a Drill, Oren Jacoby (United States)
- Toitū: Visual Sovereignty, Chelsea Winstanley (New Zealand)
- Tough Old Broads, Stacey Tenenbaum (Canada)
- Tow, Stephanie Laing (United States)
- Tropical Paradise (Paraíso Tropical), Abner Benaim (Panama)
- Two Ugly People, Peter Skinner (Australia)
- Untethered: A Wildly Different Normal, Aymie Majerski (United States)
- The Vanished Girl (Sauvage), Camille Ponsin (France)
- Vanishing Goats (Élise sous emprise), Marie Rémond (France)
- Versailles, Andrés Clariond Rangel (Mexico)
- Wasteman, Cal McMau (United Kingdom)
- What We Carry, Jessie Anthony (Canada)
- A Woman's Work, A.R. Ephraim (United States)
- Wrong Husband (Uiksaringitara), Zacharias Kunuk (Canada)
- The Yellow Tie, Serge Ioan Celebidachi (Romania)
- You Had to Be There, Nick Davis (United States)

=== Short films ===
- A Short Documentary About a Giant Pencil, Daniel Straub (United States)
- Abel, Brian Zahm (United States)
- Agnes, Leah Vlemmiks (United Kingdom)
- Agnès, Nora Arnezeder (France)
- Ali's Story, Benito Sinclair (United States)
- All Heart, Michael Govier and Will McCormack (United States)
- Amazeze (Fleas), Jordy Sank (South Africa)
- Astronauta, Giorgio Giampà (Italy, Mexico, Guatemala, France)
- At Night, Pooya Afzali (Iran)
- The Baddest Speechwriter of All, Ben Proudfoot, Stephen Curry (United States)
- Barbara, Jillian Moray (United States)
- The Bear Beneath, Olivia Hille (United States)
- Behind the Mask, Catherine Andre (United States)
- Beyond Silence, Marnie Blok (Netherlands)
- Bimo, Oumnia Hanader (France)
- California is Burning, Bennett Curran (United States)
- Candy Bar, Nash Edgerton (Australia)
- Change Makers, Casey Beck (United States, Greece)
- Committee Animal, Robert Redfield (United States)
- Coyotes, Said Zagha (France, Palestine, UK, Jordan)
- The Crash Out, Emelie Claxton (United States)
- Daddy's Little Meatball, Yael Grunseit (Australia, United States)
- Dark Skin Bruises Differently, Susan Wokoma (United Kingdom)
- The Divine Feminine, Ivana Todorovic (Serbia)
- Dongmei (冬梅), Rubing Zhang (China)
- Earworm, Patrik Eklund (Sweden)
- Egg Timer, Rosie May Bird Smith (United Kingdom)
- Fil-Am, Ralph Torrefranca (United States)
- The Finger Wife, Taryn Stickrath-Hutt and Dan Lund (United States)
- Fly on the Wall (La Mosca en la Pared), Mar Novo (Mexico)
- Get Her Back, Leah Nanako Winkler (United States)
- The Gift of Darkness (El Regalo de Oscuridad), Lauren David (United States)
- The Green Truck, Nicole Noren (United States)
- Habbal et al., Sean Paulsen and Brad Wickham (United States)
- Habibi, Alexey Evstigneev (France)
- The Halfway Between All This, Heather Greer and Alison Cornyn (United States)
- Halifax Pier, Matthew Daniel Herst (Canada)
- A Hand to Hold, Philip Clyde-Smith and Eliza Power (United Kingdom)
- His House, Home, Aisling O'Regan Sargent (Ireland)
- I Am Li Yangqiao (我叫李杨桥), Qianai Lin (林千爱), Yiqian Ma (马艺芊), Xihan Yin (殷熙涵), Zhiyan Chen (陈祉彦), Junqi Long (龙骏骐), and Ruizhe Pan (潘睿喆) (China)
- Impact, Aidan Largey (United Kingdom)
- Invisible Dragons, Victoria Boult (New Zealand)
- Jeanne & Jean Jean, Thanys Martin (France)
- Keelhaul, Edgar Cortés Campoy (United States)
- Mandatory Call (Toque Reglamentario), Ana Cecilia Sandoval (Mexico)
- Mary Is Missing, Aisling Byrne (Ireland)
- Memory Experiment, Kerrilee Gore (United States)
- Moths, Pema Baldwin (United States)
- My Boyfriend Follows You on Instagram, Caroline Falls (United States)
- My Type, Daniela Ruah (United States)

== Awards ==
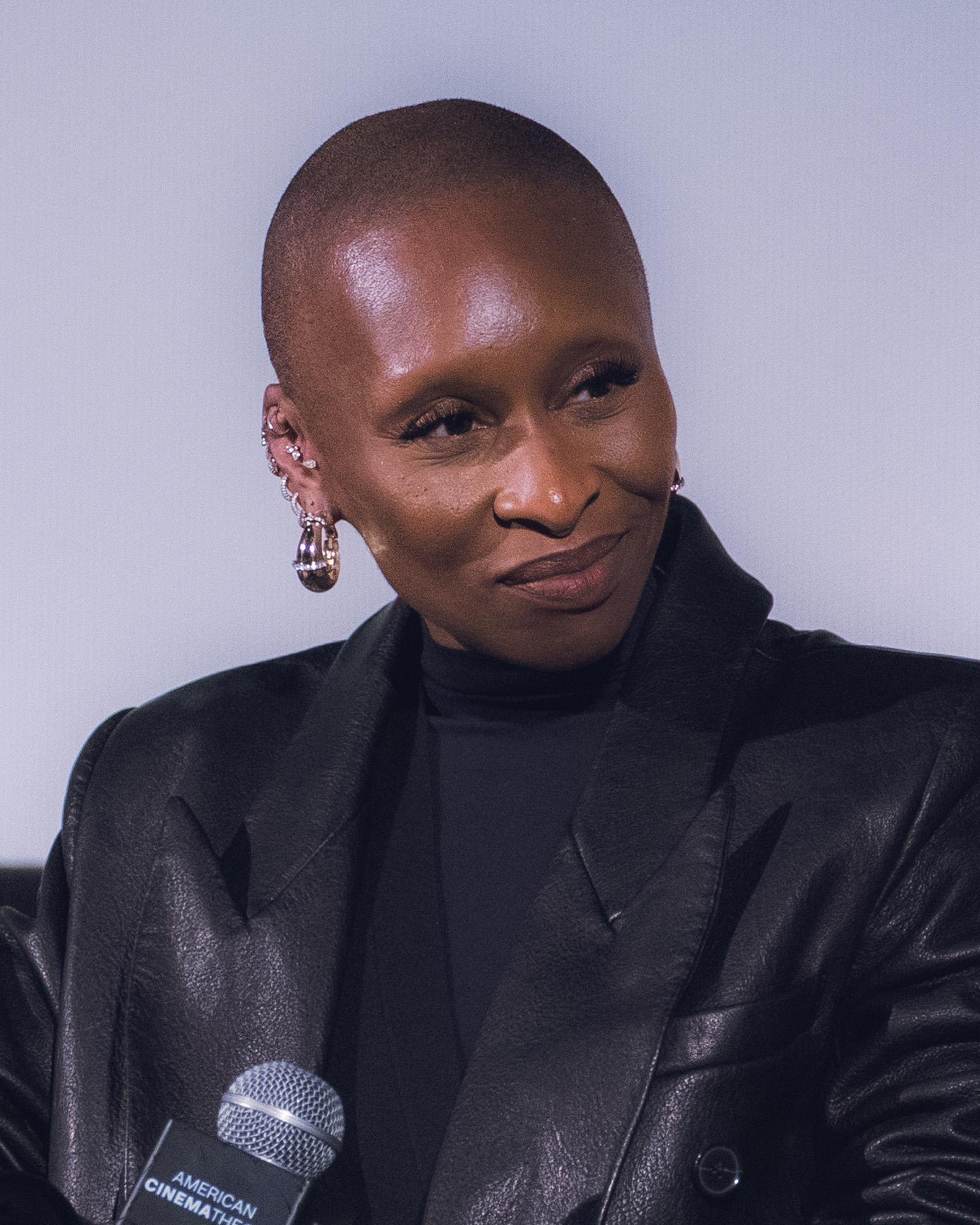
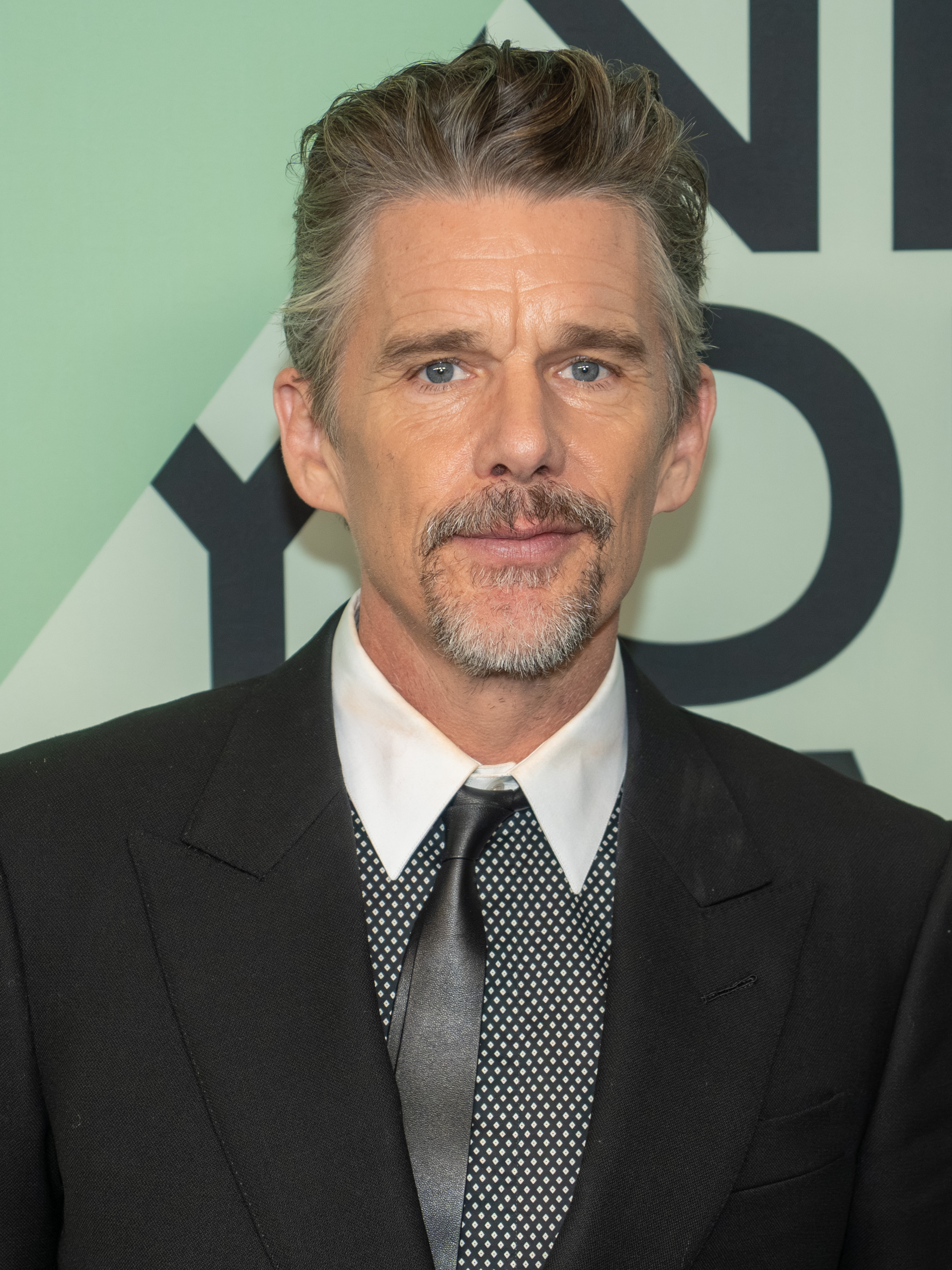
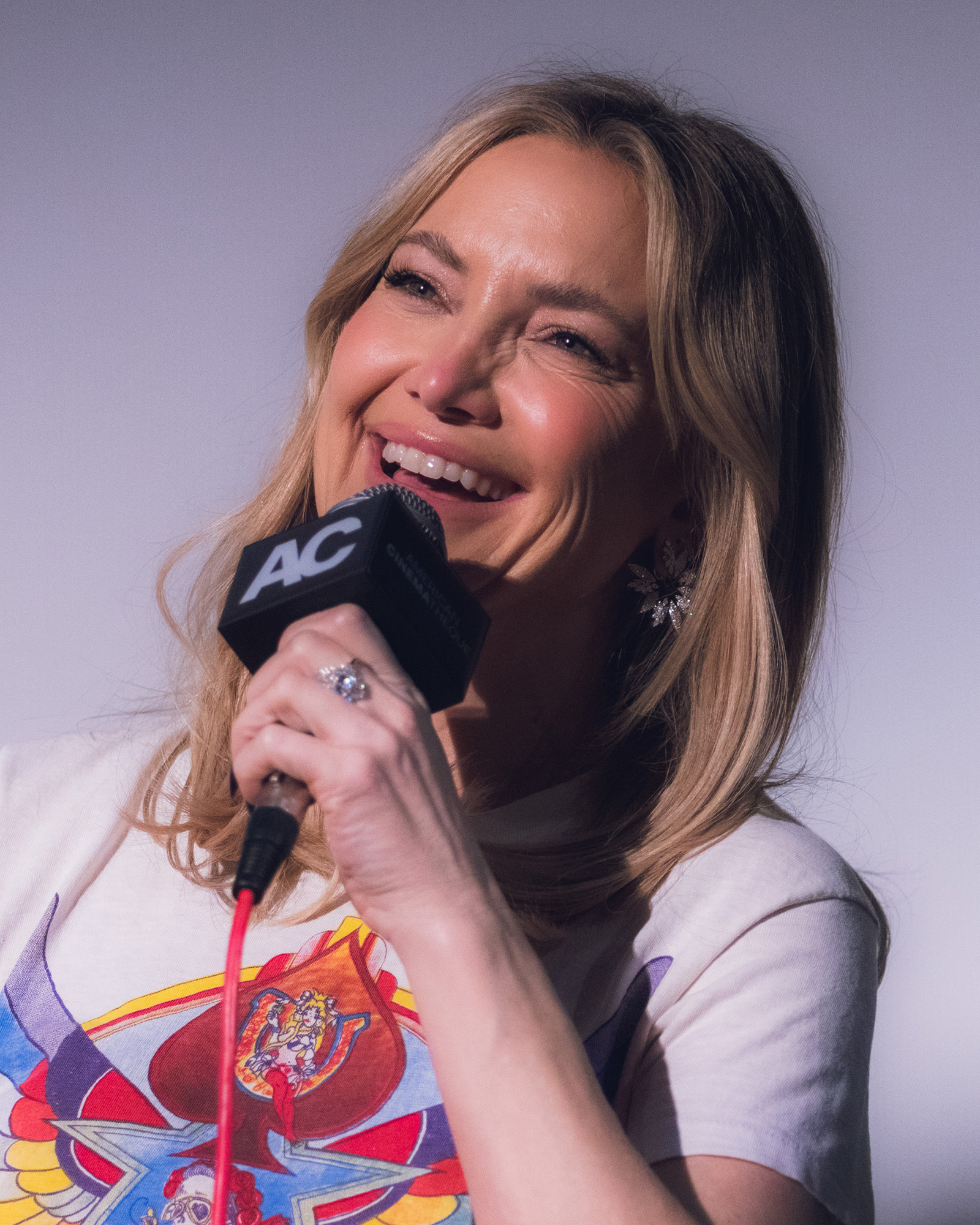
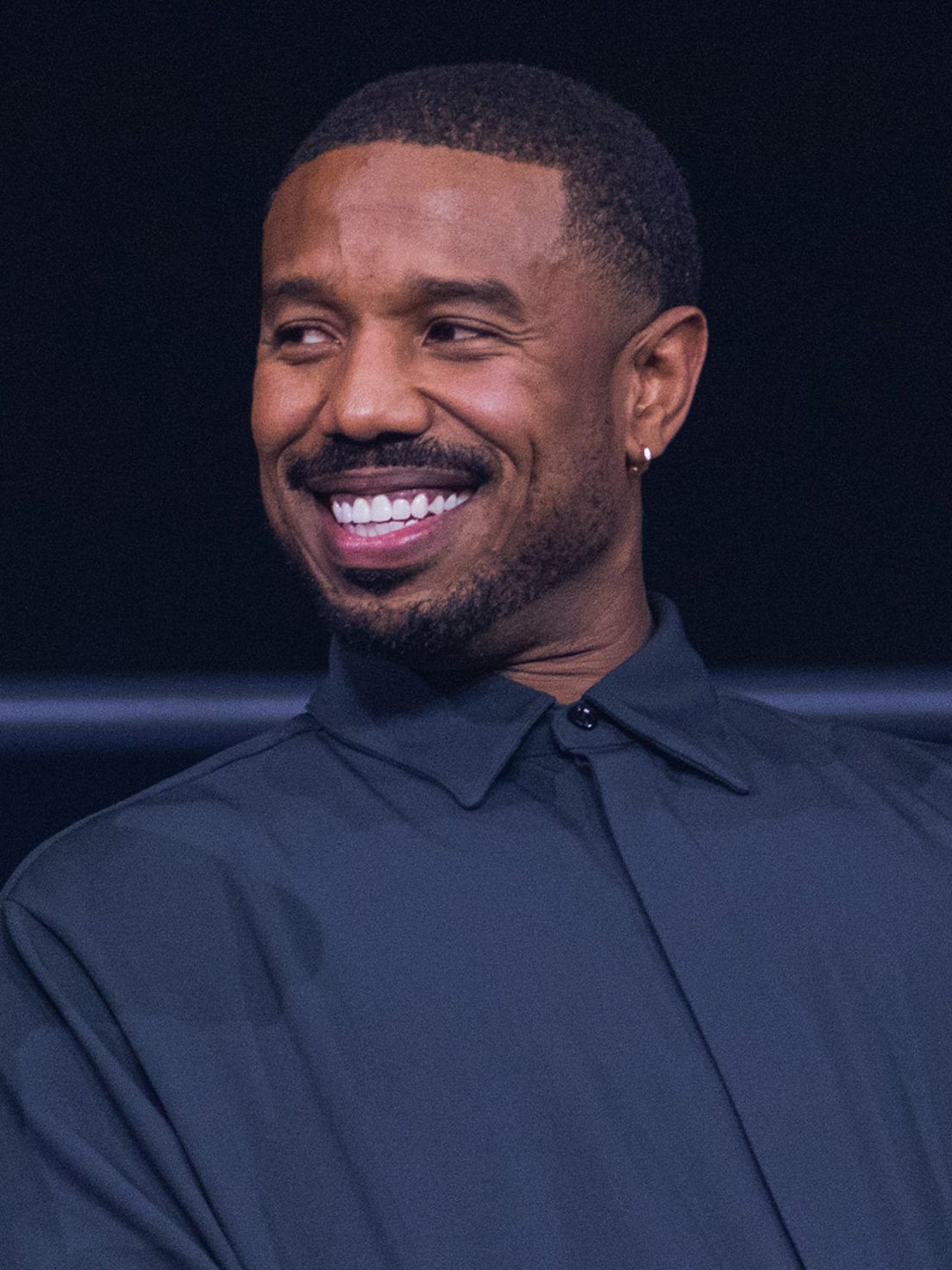
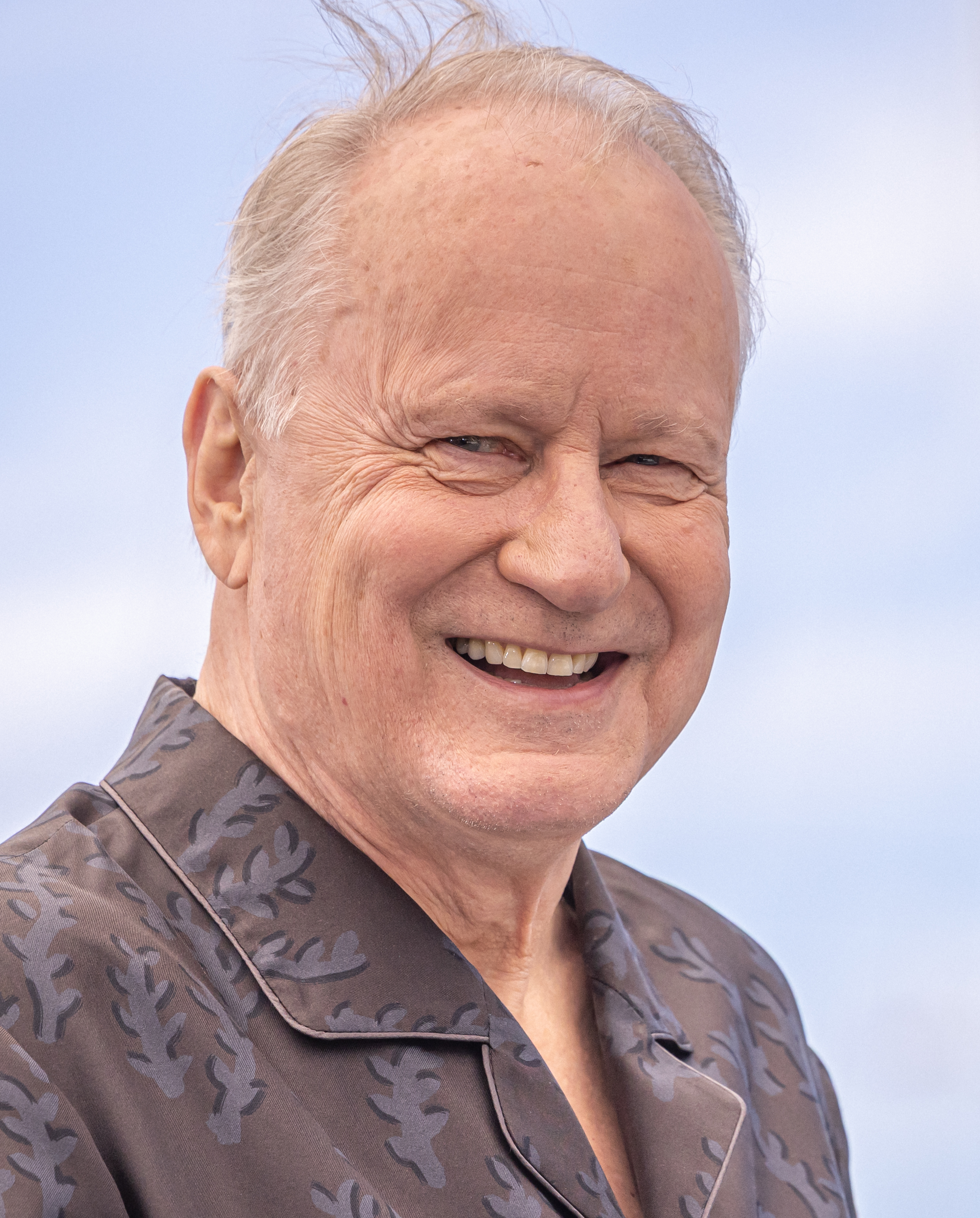
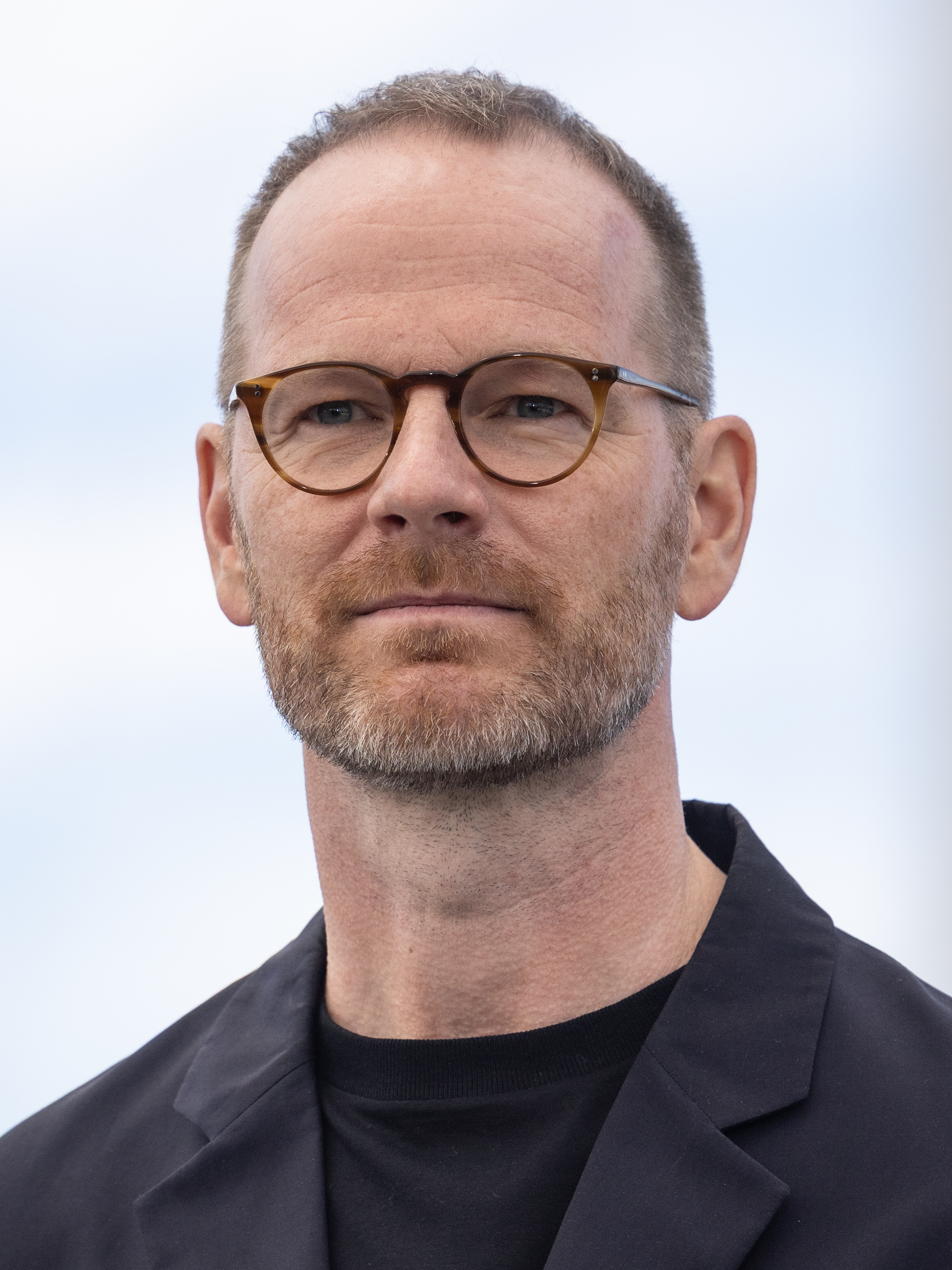
Top (from left to right): Cynthia Erivo, Ethan Hawke, and Kate Hudson
Bottom (from left to right): Michael B. Jordan, Stellan Skarsgård, and Joachim Trier
Recipients of the Kirk Douglas Award for Excellence in Film, the American Riviera Award, the Arlington Artist of the Year Award, the Outstanding Performer of the Year Award, Montecito Award and the Outstanding Director of the Year Award, respectively
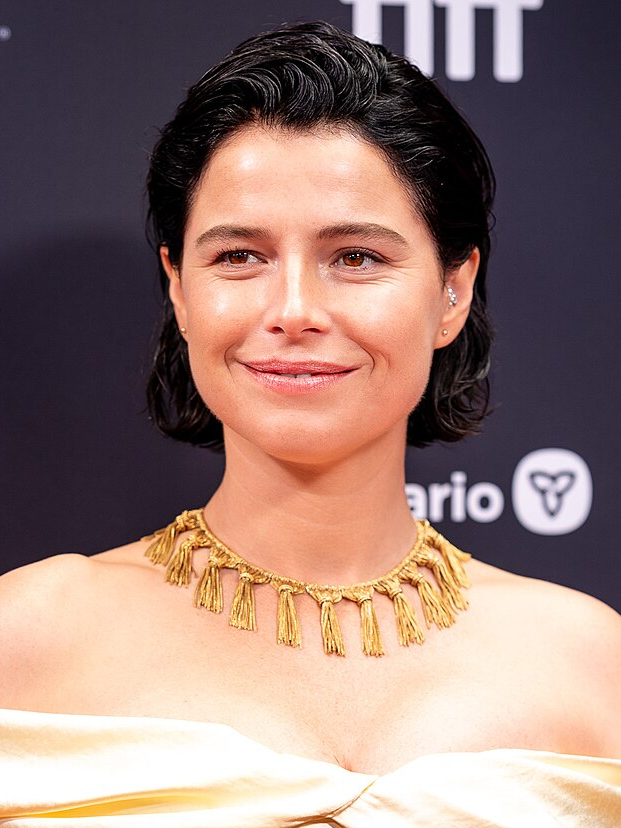
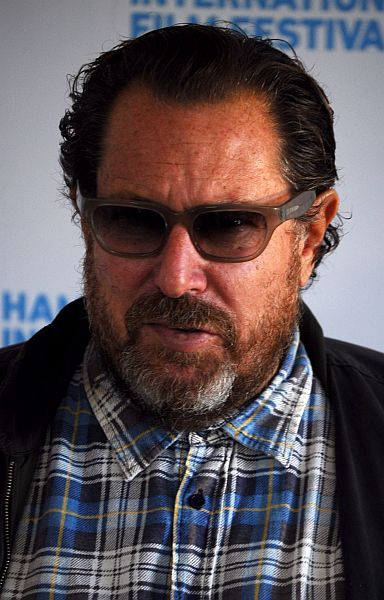
Honorees Jessie Buckley and Julian Schnabel, honored with a hosted retrospective of their respective films
- Audience Choice Award: Steal This Story, Please! by Carl Deal and Tia Lessin
- Panavision Spirit Award for Independent Cinema: A Mosquito in the Ear by Nicola Rinciari
- Jeffrey C. Barbakow Award for Best International Feature Film: Adam's Sake (L'intérêt d'Adam) by Laura Wandel
- Best Documentary Award: Gaslit by Katie Camosy
- Nueva Vision Award for Spain/Latin America Cinema: Versailles by Andrés Clariond Rangel
- Best Animated Short Film Award: Butterfly (Papillon) by Florence Miailhe
- Best Documentary Short Film Award: A Short Documentary About a Giant Pencil by Daniel Straub
- Best Live-Action Short Film Award: Agnès by Nora Arnezeder
- Social Justice Award: Steal This Story, Please! by Carl Deal and Tia Lessin
- ADL Stand Up Award: Bookends by Mike Doyle
- ASC Award for Best Cinematography: Lost Land (Harà Watan) by Akio Fujimoto
- American Riviera Award: Ethan Hawke, American actor
- Arlington Artist of the Year Award: Kate Hudson, American actress
- Hammond Cinema Vanguard Award: Benicio del Toro, Leonardo DiCaprio, and Sean Penn
- Kirk Douglas Award for Excellence in Film: Cynthia Erivo, British actress and singer
- Maltin Modern Master Award: Adam Sandler, American actor and comedian
- Montecito Award: Stellan Skarsgård, Swedish actor
- Outstanding Director of the Year Award:
  - Ryan Coogler (Sinners)
  - Josh Safdie (Marty Supreme)
  - Joachim Trier (Sentimental Value)
  - Chloé Zhao (Hamnet)
- Outstanding Performer of the Year Award: Michael B. Jordan (Sinners)
- Variety Artisans Award:
  - Alexandre Desplat – Original Score (Frankenstein)
  - EJAE – Original Song ("Golden" from KPop Demon Hunters)
  - Jack Fisk – Production Design (Marty Supreme)
  - Kate Hawley – Costume Design (Frankenstein)
  - Mike Hill – Makeup (Frankenstein)
  - Andy Jurgensen – Editing (One Battle After Another)
  - Al Nelson – Sound Editing (F1)
  - Eric Saindon – Visual Effects (Avatar: Fire and Ash)
  - Adolpho Veloso – Cinematography (Train Dreams)
  - Chris Welcker – Sound Mixing (Sinners)
- Virtuosos Award:
  - Jacob Elordi (Frankenstein)
  - Inga Ibsdotter Lilleaas (Sentimental Value)
  - Chase Infiniti (One Battle After Another)
  - Amy Madigan (Weapons)
  - Wunmi Mosaku (Sinners)
  - Wagner Moura (The Secret Agent)
  - Renate Reinsve (Sentimental Value)
  - Sydney Sweeney (Christy)
  - Teyana Taylor (One Battle After Another)
  - Jeremy Allen White (Springsteen: Deliver Me from Nowhere)
