= The Last Picture Shows =

2026 documentary film

- Film poster
- Directed by: Rustin Thompson
- Written by: Rustin Thompson
- Produced by: Rustin Thompson
- Cinematography: Rustin Thompson
- Edited by: Rustin Thompson
- Production company: Foghorn Features
- Distributed by: Foghorn Features
- Release date: February 9, 2026 (SBIFF)
- Running time: 78 minutes
- Country: United States
- Language: English
- Budget: $300,000
- Box office: $57,119

The Last Picture Shows is a 2026 American documentary film about movie theaters in small west American towns, including abandoned theaters, ones that are struggling to survive, and ones that are doing well. Clips from Peter Bogdanovich's film The Last Picture Show (1971) are interspersed in the documentary. It is edited, shot, produced, written, and directed by Rustin Thompson. It premiered at the Santa Barbara International Film Festival on February 9, 2026.

== Production ==
The film was shot during two lengthy road trips Thompson took in the summers of 2023 and 2024. He said, "In some cases, I reached out to the owners before I got to the towns, but a lot of times it was hard to get in touch, so I would just show up. I would walk in, and usually the owner was there serving concessions, and I just started talking to them and said, 'Hey, do you want to be in this film I'm making?' And right on the spot, they would say yes, and I'd do an interview, no hassles with corporations or PR people."

Additional cinematography was provided by Thompson's son, Nick Thompson, the director of the film Skagit.

== Reception ==
On the review aggregator website Rotten Tomatoes, 100% of 22 critics' reviews are positive, with an average rating of 8.6/10. Metacritic, which uses a weighted average, assigned the film a score of 85 out of 100, based on four critics, indicating "universal acclaim".

Donald Liebenson of RogerEbert.com gave the film three and a half out of four stars and wrote that it's "a cautionary tale and a love letter to an era before it becomes bygone." In a positive review, Glenn Kenny of The New York Times wrote, "[T]he movie's lyrical and elegiac tone makes it truly resonant." Leonard Maltin also gave it a positive review, writing, "The Last Picture Shows is a moving and poetic slice of Americana."
