= Environmental Film Festival in the Nation's Capital =

US film festival

- Location: Washington, D.C., United States
- Founded: 1993 by Flo Stone
- Awards: 2016 Documentary Award for Environmental Advocacy, "How to Let Go of the World" by Josh Fox; 2016 William W. Warner Beautiful Swimmers Award, "The Seer" by Laura Dunn; 2016 Polly Krakora Award for Artistry in Film, "The Birth of Saké" by Erik Shirai; 2016 Eric Moe Sustainability Award, "Bluebird Man" by Matthew Podolsky and Neil Paprocki
- No. of films: 150 (2016)
- Language: International
- Website: dceff.org

The Environmental Film Festival in the Nation's Capital (DCEFF) is an environmental film festival. The festival is held annually March in Washington, D.C., presenting more than 100 films to an audience of over 30,000. Often combined with thematic discussions and social events, the films screen at museums, embassies, libraries, universities and local theaters.

== History ==
In 2007, the first year of the festival, 1,200 people attended. In 2011 the festival had grown to 30,000 participants.

The Festival was voted Best Film Festival by the readers of Washington City Paper in 2019 and 2020.

== Awards ==
Documentary Award for Environmental Advocacy

- 2025 – Out of Plain Sight by Daniel Straub and Rosanna Xia
- 2016 - "How to Let Go of the World" by Josh Fox
- 2015 - Racing Extinction by Louie Psihoyos
- 2014 - DamNation by Travis Rummel and Ben Knight

William W. Warner Beautiful Swimmers Award

- 2016 - "The Seer" by Laura Dunn
- 2015 - "TigerTiger" by George Butler

Polly Krakora Award for Artistry in Film

- 2016 - The Birth of Saké by Erik Shirai
- 2015 - Monsoon by Sturla Gunnarsson
- 2014 - "Once Upon A Forest" by Luc Jacquet
- 2013 - Harmony by Stuart Sender
- 2012 - The Tsunami and the Cherry Blossom by Lucy Walker
- 2011 - Oil Rocks: City Above the Sea by Marc Wolfensberger
- 2010 - The Music Tree by Otavio Juliano

Eric Moe Sustainability Award

- 2016 - "Bluebird Man" by Matthew Podolsky and Neil Paprocki
- 2015 - "Silent River" by Jason Jaacks and Steve Fisher
- 2014 - "Amazing Grace" by Rowan Pybus

== Venues ==
Films are screened at partnering museums, embassies, libraries, universities and local theaters, including The National Archives, National Museum of American History, and the National Museum of Natural History.
