= Jackson Wild =

Nonprofit Organization

- Location: Jackson Hole, WY
- Founded: 1991
- Founded by: Wolfgang Bayer
- Awards: Grand Teton Award
- Website: www.jacksonwild.org/index.html

Jackson Wild, formerly Jackson Hole Wildlife Film Festival, is a film festival turned nonprofit organization founded in 1991. Jackson Wild is based in Jackson Hole in the state of Wyoming, USA. The organization is primarily known for the annual Jackson Wild Summit, an international conference for professionals in the natural history filmmaking and media industry, as well as the Jackson Wild Media Awards recognizing excellence in natural history filmmaking. The Summit is typically held within Grand Teton National Park at the Jackson Lake Lodge.

The organization also hosts events around the world, including their annual World Wildlife Day Film Showcase, organized in partnership with CITES and the UNDP. Alongside events, Jackson Wild produces different programs that support emerging filmmakers, such as the African Conservation Voices program in partnership with the African Wildlife Foundation.

== Jackson Wild Summit ==
The Jackson Wild Summit is held annually in September and consists of panel discussions, film screenings, workshops, and networking opportunities. The Summit culminates in an Awards Gala, in which the winners of the annual Jackson Wild Media Awards are announced.

== Jackson Wild Media Awards ==
The Jackson Wild Media Awards are an annual film competition recognizing excellence in nature, science and conservation filmmaking. In 2021, Jackson Wild introduced Special Jury Recognitions, a peer-nominated honor separate from the Media Awards recognizing and celebrating impactful individuals and innovative content in the industry.

== Jackson Wild Frontiers ==
Jackson Wild leads a number of professional development and training opportunities for early-career and emerging filmmakers. The Jackson Wild Media Lab is a cross-disciplinary science filmmaking workshop that brings scientists and media creators together. Jackson Wild offers additional Media Labs in partnership with other organizations, including the African Conservation Voices Media Labs.

The organization also has a Summit Fellowship program for mid-career filmmakers to accelerate their project that is currently in development through trainings and mentorship at the annual Summit.
