= Berkshire International Film Festival =

- Location: Great Barrington, Massachusetts
- Founded: 2005
- Directors: Kelley R. Vickery
- Website: http://www.biffma.com/

The Berkshire International Film Festival (BIFF) was founded in 2005 by Kelley Vickery in Great Barrington, Massachusetts. The four-day festival features independent films for filmmakers and film aficionados, with showings of features, documentaries, shorts, and animation—as well as panel discussions and special events focusing on filmmakers and talented artists from both sides of the camera.

It is scheduled in mid-May as a kick-off to the Berkshires cultural season. BIFF aims to provide filmmakers, producers, directors, writers and actors a place to present their work and to interact with each other and with the audience. The Festival aims to showcase challenging and relevant documentaries, and to provide a platform for Berkshire filmmakers. In 2010 the festival attracted 500 submissions, of which 77 were selected for screening.

== Selected films ==
2025

- Handwoven, produced by Dasha Levin

2016

- Untouchable, directed by David Feige

2012

- 2 Days in New York, directed by Julie Delpy
- Café de Flore, directed by Jean-Marc Vallée

2011

- Pina, directed by Wim Wenders

2010

- Cairo Time directed by Ruba Nadda
- Joan Rivers: A Piece of Work directed by Ricki Stern and Anne Sundberg
- Atletu (The Athlete) directed by Davey Frankel and Rasselas Lakew
- Countdown to Zero directed by Lucy Walker
- My Year Without Sex directed by Sarah Watt
- Waste Land directed by Lucy Walker
- Last Train Home directed by Lixin Fan

2009

- William Kunstler: Disturbing the Universe, directed by Emily Kunstler and Sarah Kunstler
- The Yes Men Fix the World, directed by Andy Bichlbaum and Mike Bonanno
- Spike, directed by Robert Beaucage
- Burning Plain directed by Guillermo Arriaga
- Pressure Cooker directed by Mark Becker and Jennifer Grausman

2008

- A Prairie Home Companion directed by Robert Altman
- The Road to Guantanamo directed by Michael Winterbottom
- Man Push Cart directed by Ramin Bahrani
- Rocket Science directed by Jeffrey Blitz
- In the Shadow of the Moon directed by David Sington and Christopher Riley

2007

- Arranged directed by Diane Crespo and Stefan Schaefer
