= Woods Hole Film Festival =

Film festival in Massachusetts, U.S.

- Location: Woods Hole, Massachusetts, United States
- Founded: 1991
- Festival date: Late July through the first week of August
- Language: International
- Website: www.woodsholefilmfestival.org

The Woods Hole Film Festival was founded in 1991 by Judith Laster and Kate Davis.

== Overview ==
Since its foundation, the festival has grown from a one-day invitational event to an eight-day event with films submitted from around the world. The festival is held each year from the last Saturday of July through the first Saturday of August in the village of Woods Hole, Massachusetts.

The festival screens around 100 films culled from more than 700 submissions and has daily screenings of independent film, workshops, panel discussions, special events, readings, and informal get-togethers.

Woods Hole is the oldest independent film festival on Cape Cod and, while the festival is dedicated to screening the work of emerging independent filmmakers—with a special emphasis on New England films and filmmakers—it also screens work and hosts filmmakers from elsewhere.
