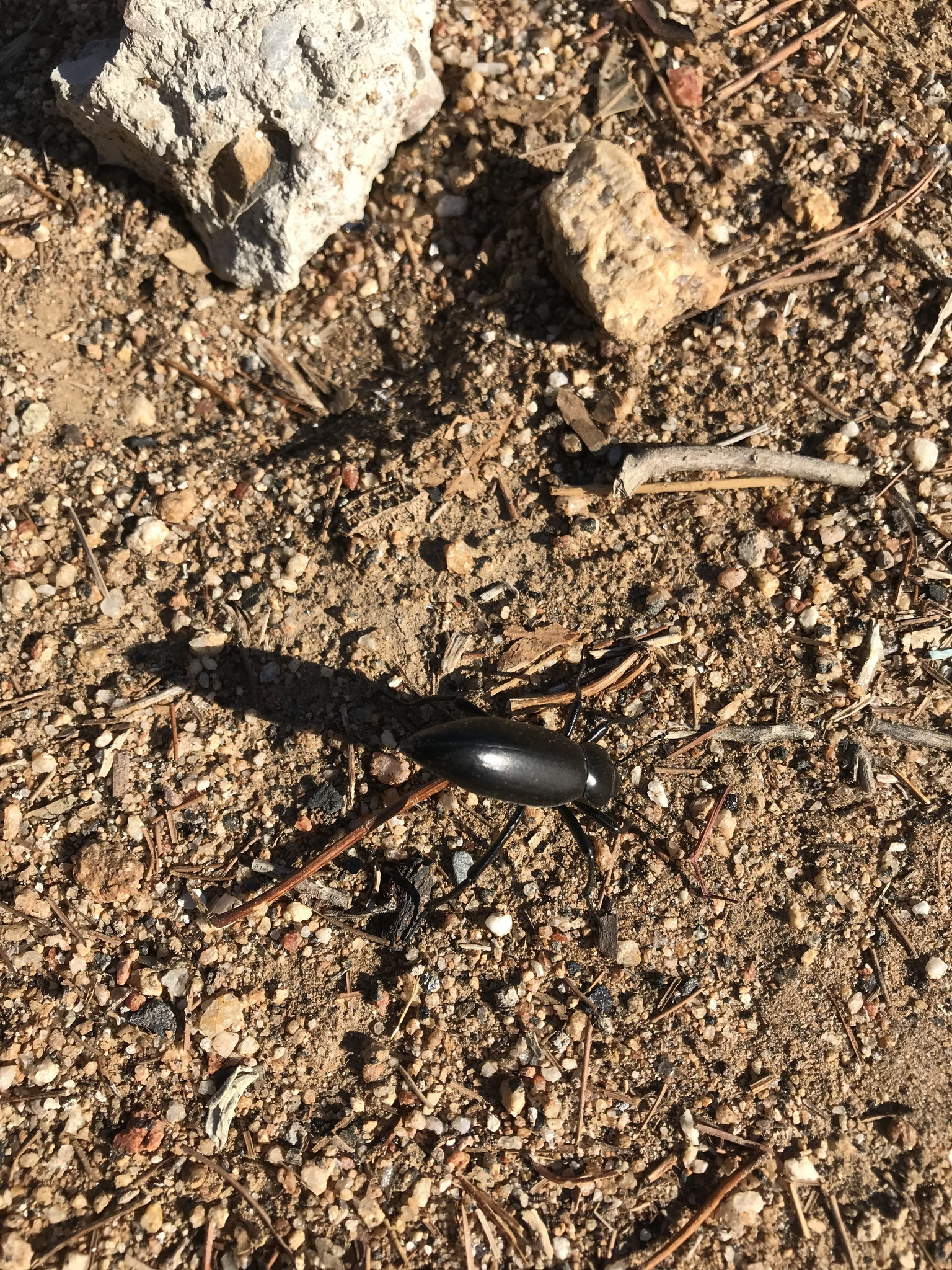

Scientific classification
- Kingdom: Animalia
- Phylum: Arthropoda
- Class: Insecta
- Order: Coleoptera
- Suborder: Polyphaga
- Infraorder: Cucujiformia
- Family: Tenebrionidae
- Genus: Eleodes
- Species: E. gigantea

Binomial name
- Eleodes gigantea Mannerheim, 1843

= Eleodes gigantea =

Species of beetle

Eleodes gigantea is a species of desert stink beetle or darkling beetle in the family Tenebrionidae. They can be found from San Francisco, California down to Tijuana, Mexico, however, they are more typically located in the lower half of California from Santa Cruz to San Diego.

They typically have a smooth black elytron and like other species of Eleodes, when frightened they secrete benzoquinone and upturn their bodies to spray it. The secretion is orange in color and has a strong odor that causes the eyes to water.

Eleodes gigantea meridionalis have been found in the La Brea Tar Pits and some of the earliest reports of the species date back to 1918. They are most active during sundown.

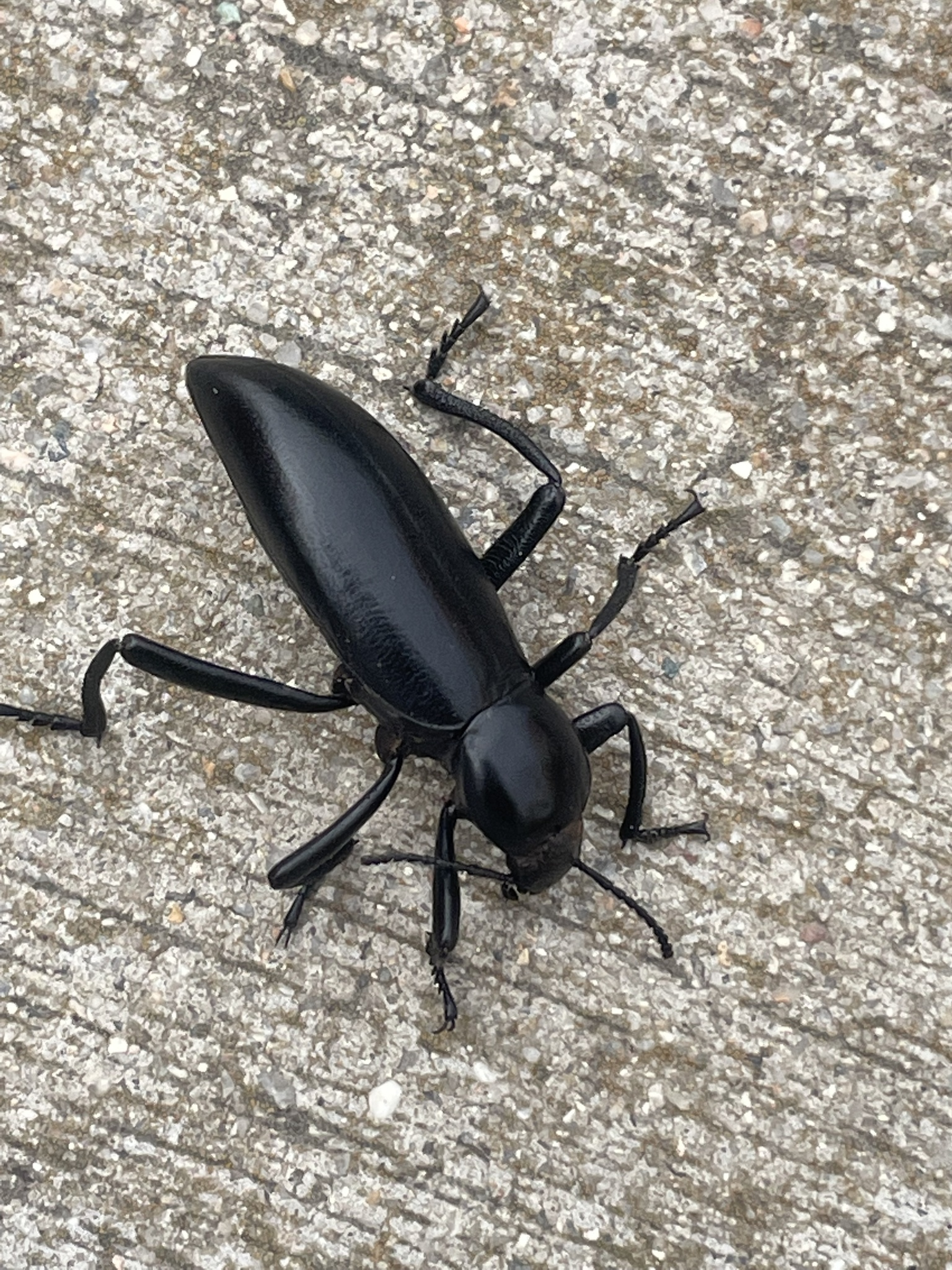
Eleodes gigantea
