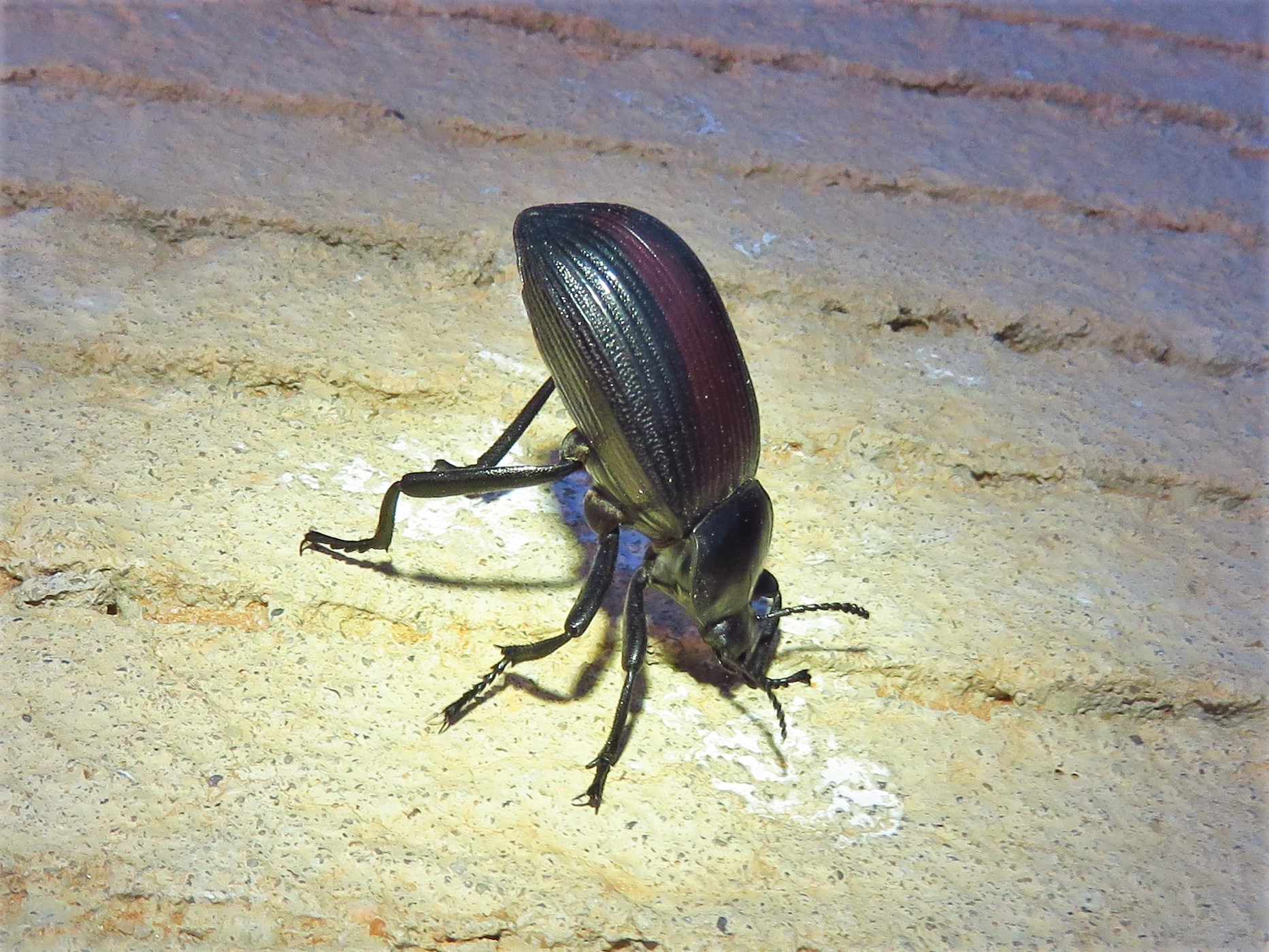

Scientific classification
- Kingdom: Animalia
- Phylum: Arthropoda
- Class: Insecta
- Order: Coleoptera
- Suborder: Polyphaga
- Infraorder: Cucujiformia
- Family: Tenebrionidae
- Genus: Eleodes
- Species: E. acuta

Binomial name
- Eleodes acuta (Say, 1824)

= Eleodes acuta =

Species of beetle

Eleodes acuta is a species of desert stink beetle in the family Tenebrionidae.
