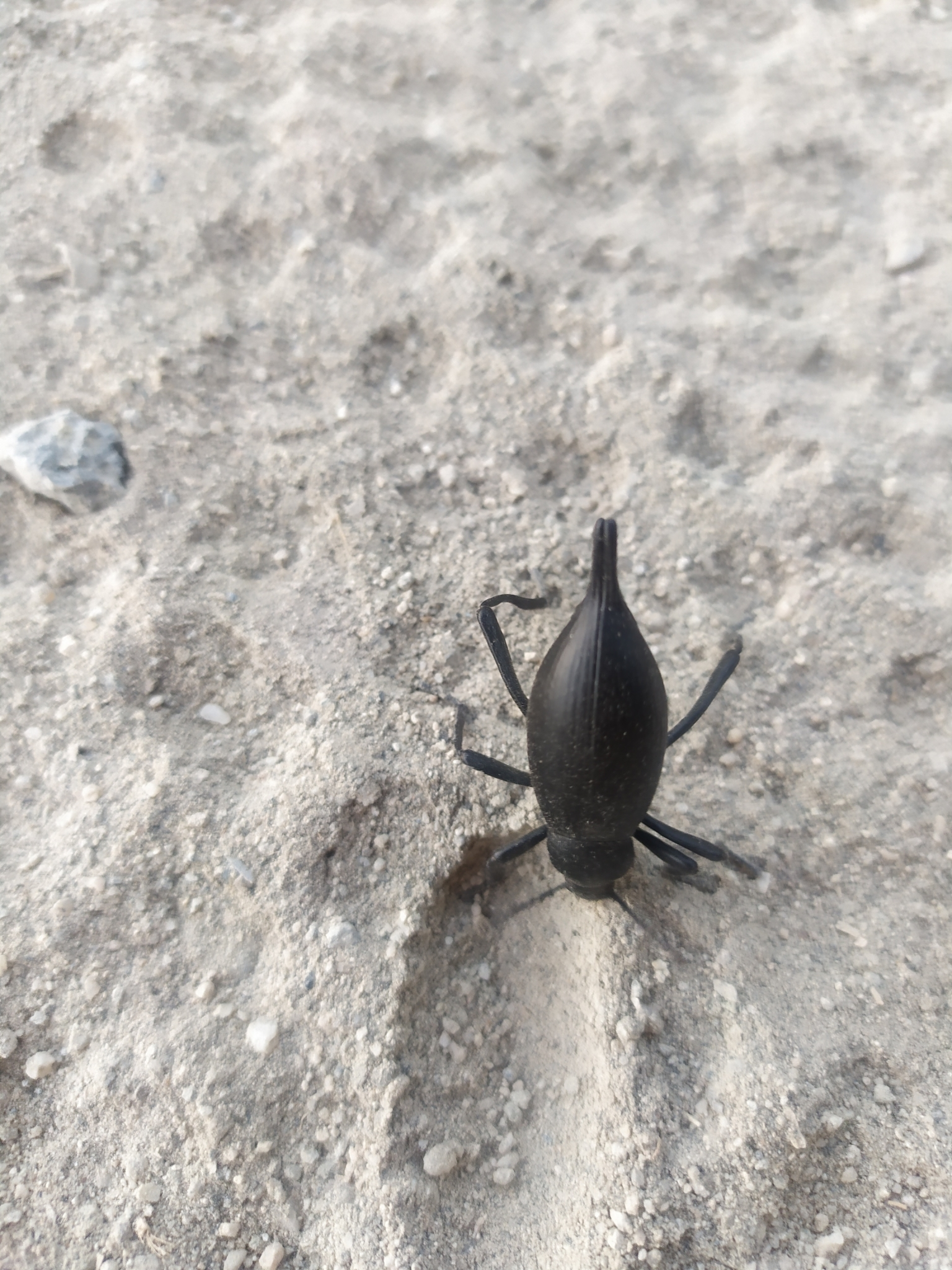
- Eleodes eschscholtzii, Mexico

Scientific classification
- Kingdom: Animalia
- Phylum: Arthropoda
- Class: Insecta
- Order: Coleoptera
- Suborder: Polyphaga
- Infraorder: Cucujiformia
- Family: Tenebrionidae
- Genus: Eleodes
- Species: E. eschscholtzii

Binomial name
- Eleodes eschscholtzii Solier, 1848

= Eleodes eschscholtzii =

Species of beetle

Eleodes eschscholtzii is a species of desert stink beetle in the family Tenebrionidae.

== Subspecies ==
These subspecies belong to the species Eleodes eschscholtzii:

- Eleodes eschscholtzii eschscholtzii
- Eleodes eschscholtzii lucae
