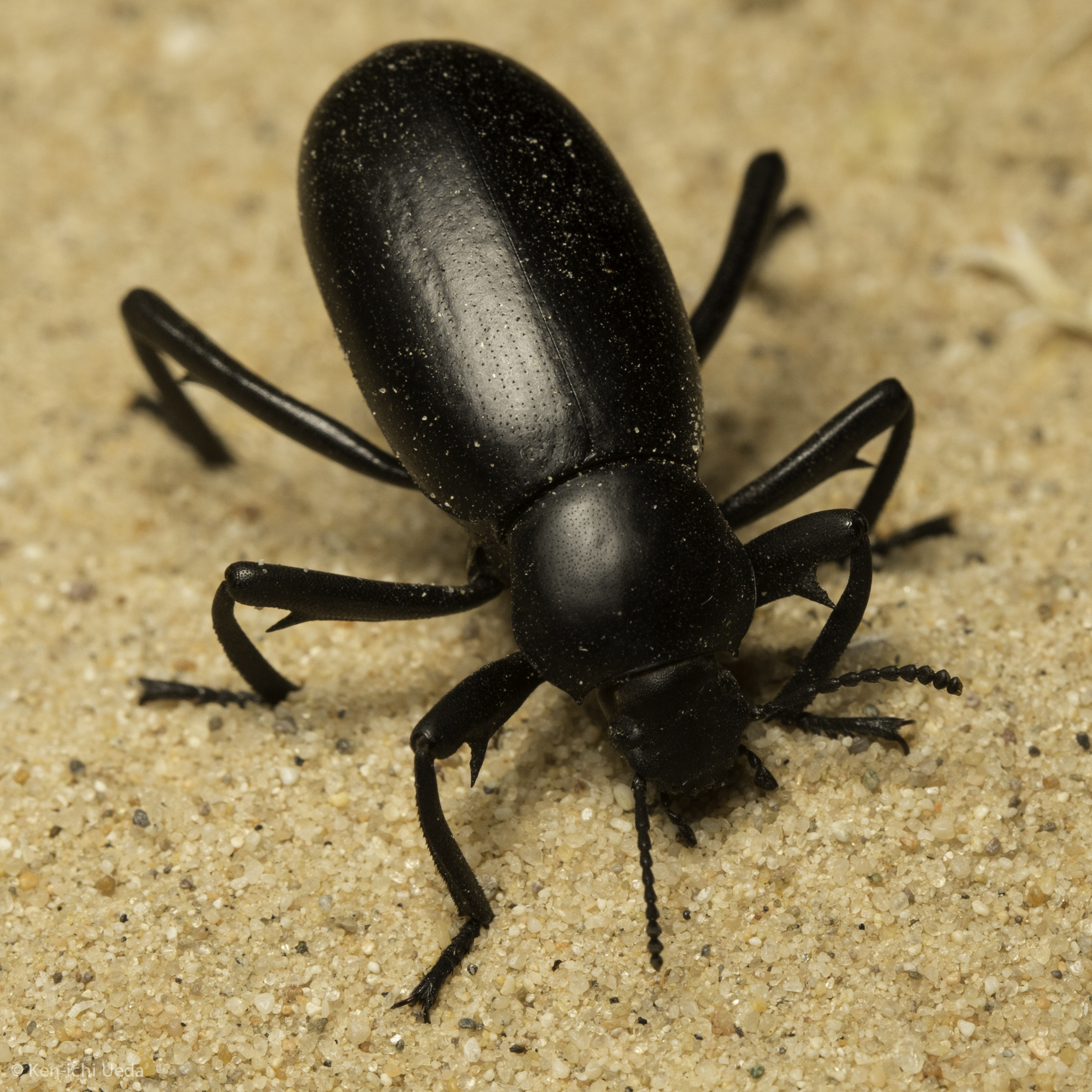

Scientific classification
- Kingdom: Animalia
- Phylum: Arthropoda
- Class: Insecta
- Order: Coleoptera
- Suborder: Polyphaga
- Infraorder: Cucujiformia
- Family: Tenebrionidae
- Genus: Eleodes
- Species: E. armata

Binomial name
- Eleodes armata LeConte, 1851

= Eleodes armata =

Species of beetle

Eleodes armata, the armored stink beetle, is a species of desert stink beetle in the family Tenebrionidae. It is found in the western United States and Mexico in arid environments. It has spurs on all of its legs.
