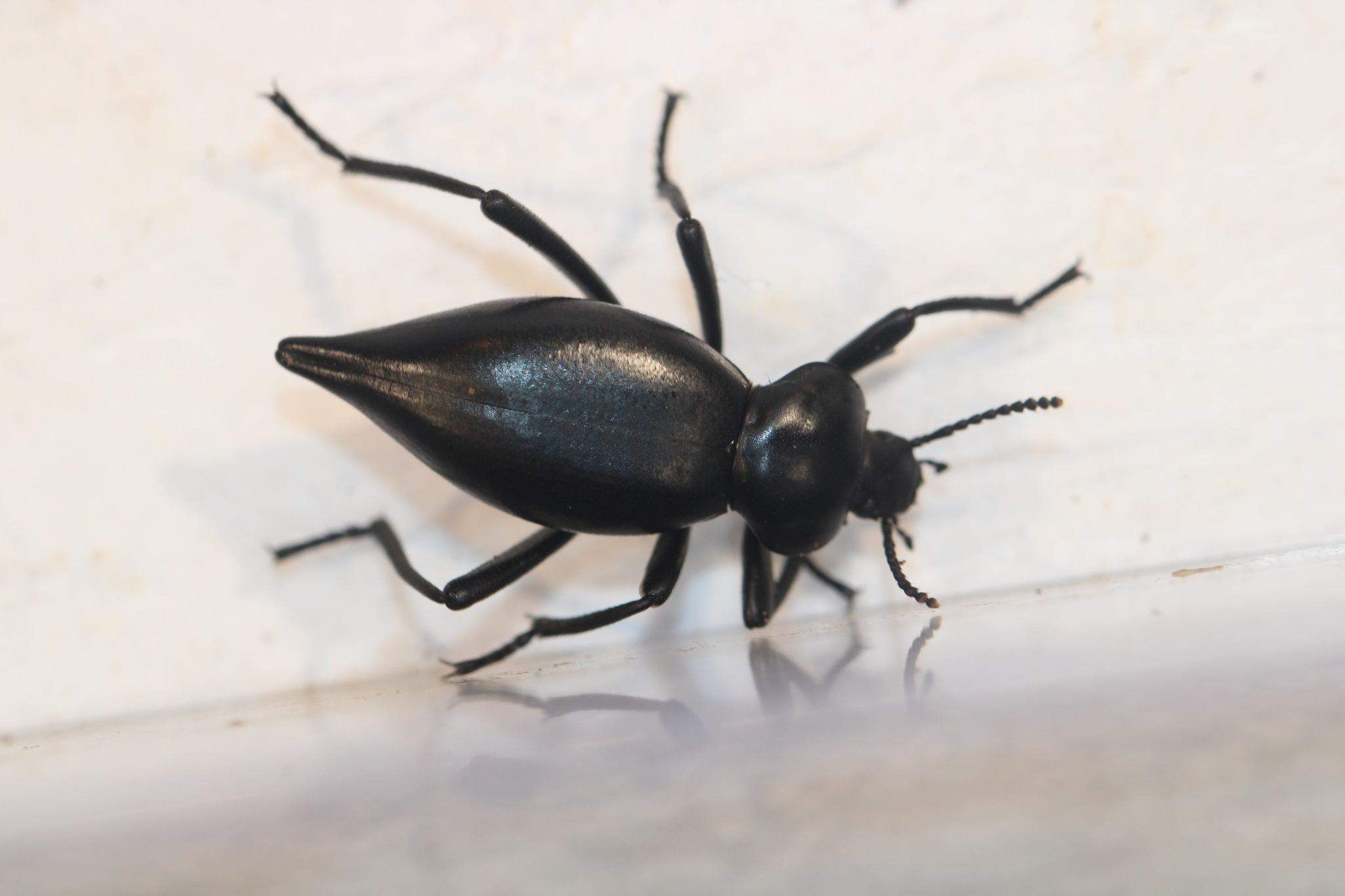

Scientific classification
- Kingdom: Animalia
- Phylum: Arthropoda
- Class: Insecta
- Order: Coleoptera
- Suborder: Polyphaga
- Infraorder: Cucujiformia
- Family: Tenebrionidae
- Genus: Eleodes
- Species: E. acuticauda

Binomial name
- Eleodes acuticauda LeConte, 1851

= Eleodes acuticauda =

Species of beetle

Eleodes acuticauda is a species of desert stink beetle in the family Tenebrionidae, found in southwestern North America. Their pronotum, strongly arcuate, is twice width of their head, having dentate projections on the anterior corners. The spines on the front legs, as well as lack of golden hairs on the underside of the legs distinguish it from Coelocnemis.
