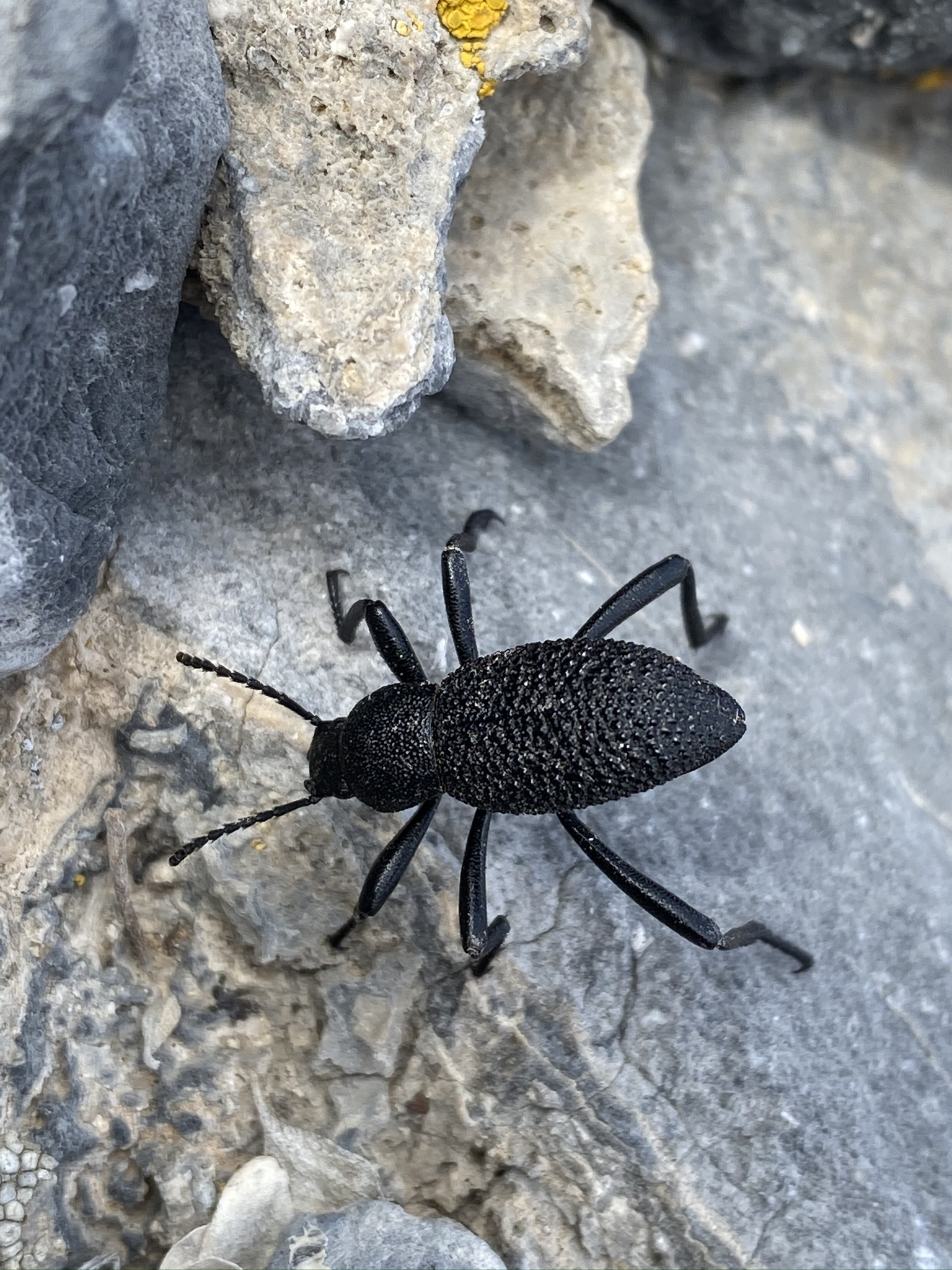

Scientific classification
- Kingdom: Animalia
- Phylum: Arthropoda
- Class: Insecta
- Order: Coleoptera
- Suborder: Polyphaga
- Infraorder: Cucujiformia
- Family: Tenebrionidae
- Genus: Eleodes
- Species: E. granosa

Binomial name
- Eleodes granosa LeConte, 1866

= Eleodes granosa =

Species of beetle

Eleodes granosa is a species of desert stink beetle in the family Tenebrionidae.
