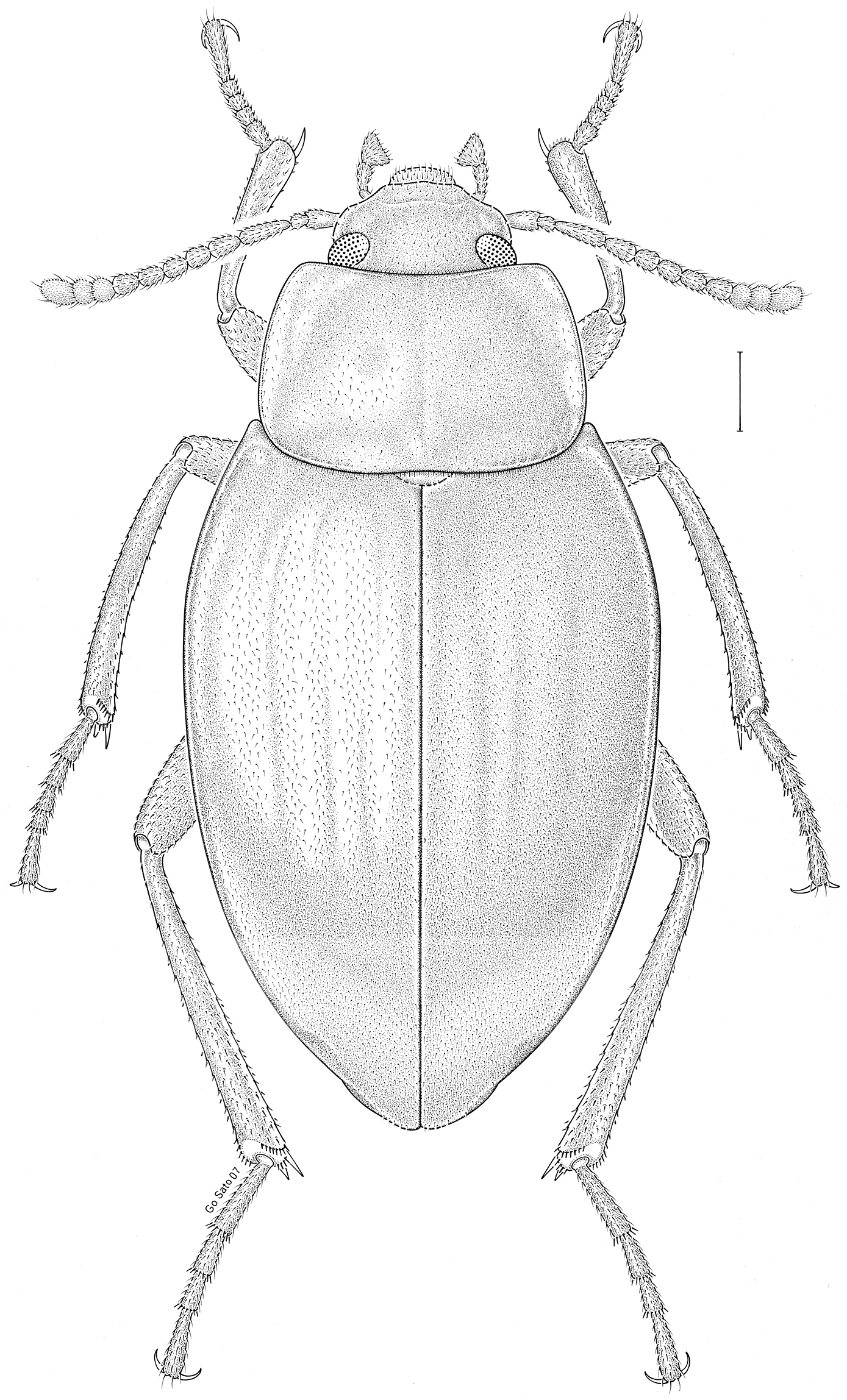

Scientific classification
- Kingdom: Animalia
- Phylum: Arthropoda
- Class: Insecta
- Order: Coleoptera
- Suborder: Polyphaga
- Infraorder: Cucujiformia
- Family: Tenebrionidae
- Genus: Eleodes
- Species: E. opaca

Binomial name
- Eleodes opaca (Say, 1824)

= Eleodes opaca =

Species of beetle

Eleodes opaca is a species of desert stink beetle in the family Tenebrionidae. It is also known as plains false wireworm.
