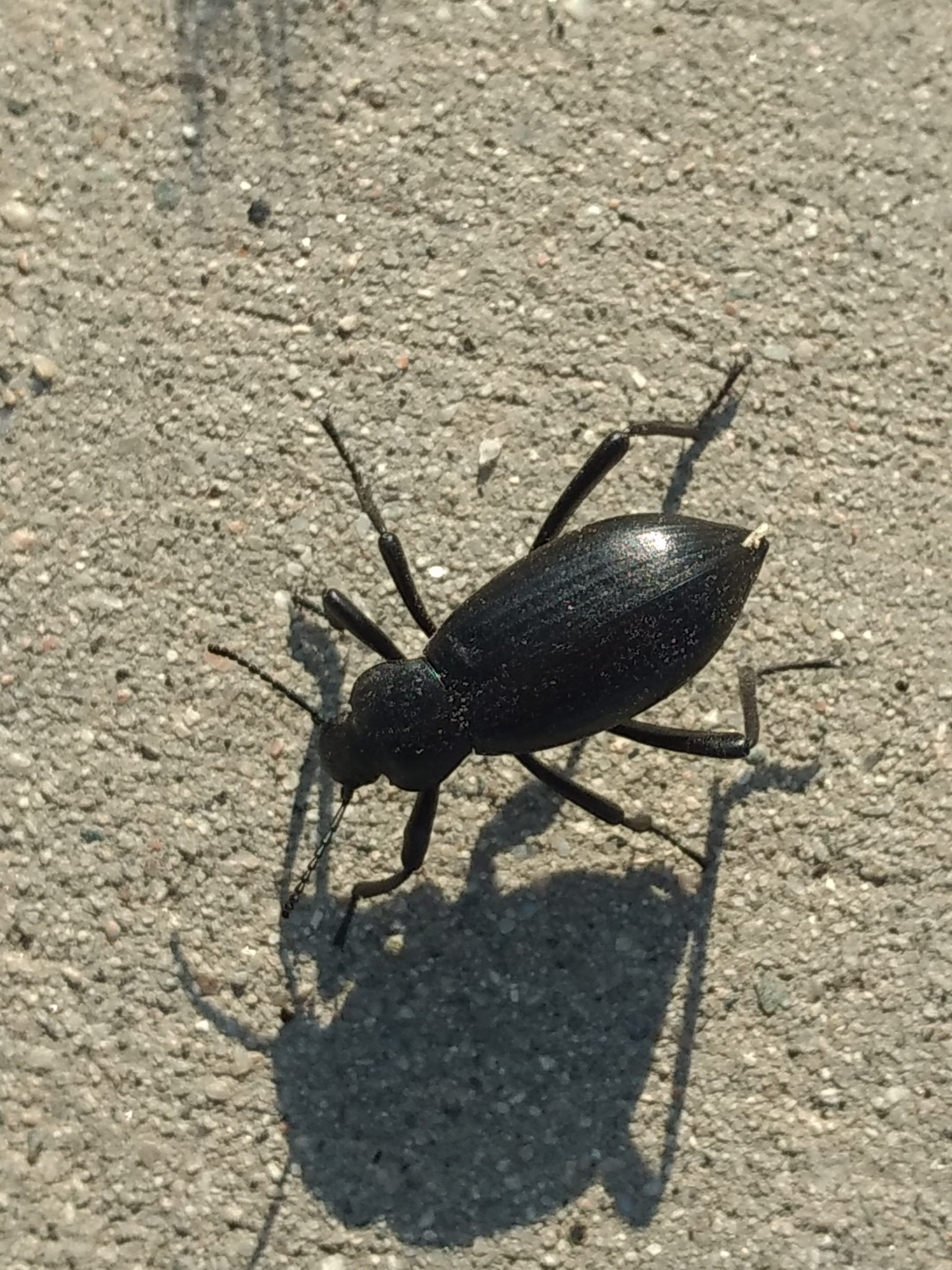

Scientific classification
- Kingdom: Animalia
- Phylum: Arthropoda
- Class: Insecta
- Order: Coleoptera
- Suborder: Polyphaga
- Infraorder: Cucujiformia
- Family: Tenebrionidae
- Genus: Eleodes
- Species: E. gracilis

Binomial name
- Eleodes gracilis LeConte, 1858

= Eleodes gracilis =

Species of beetle

Eleodes gracilis is a species of desert stink beetle in the family Tenebrionidae.

== Subspecies ==
These subspecies belong to the species Eleodes gracilis:

- Eleodes gracilis distans
- Eleodes gracilis gracilis
