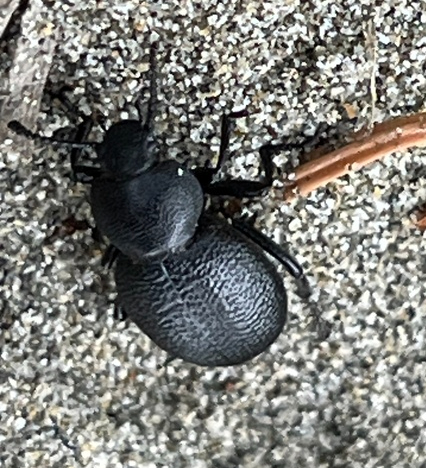
- Eleodes scabrosa found at the foreshore of Moclips Beach, Washington, USA

Scientific classification
- Kingdom: Animalia
- Phylum: Arthropoda
- Class: Insecta
- Order: Coleoptera
- Suborder: Polyphaga
- Infraorder: Cucujiformia
- Family: Tenebrionidae
- Genus: Eleodes
- Species: E. scabrosa

Binomial name
- Eleodes scabrosa Eschscholtz, 1829

= Eleodes scabrosa =

Species of desert beetle

Eleodes scabrosa is a species of desert beetle in the genus Eleodes found in western North America, from Washington state to Mexico. There are also some sporadic sightings across the rest of the United States as well, which are not as well documented.

== Habitat ==
Eleodes scabrosa can be found across western North America, ranging from Washington state to Mexico.

This species is found on beaches in the more temperate areas of its range, such as Washington state. In California and Mexico, it can be a desert dweller, while still preferring the coast.

== Appearance ==
This beetle is overall black in coloration, with a textured abdomen. The piece of exoskeleton connecting the head has an almost unnoticeable cross shaped indentation.
