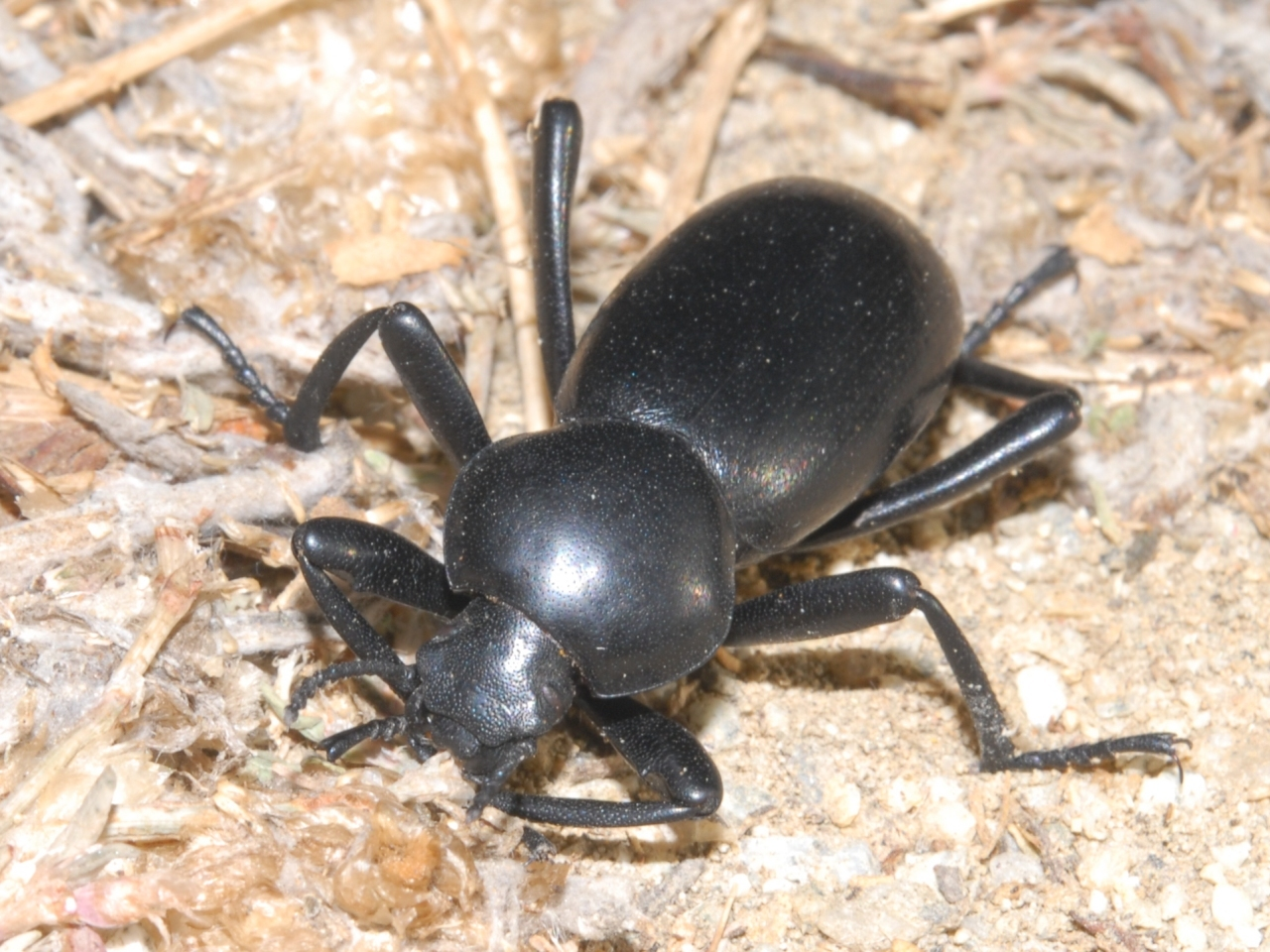
- Eleodes grandicollis

Scientific classification
- Kingdom: Animalia
- Phylum: Arthropoda
- Class: Insecta
- Order: Coleoptera
- Suborder: Polyphaga
- Infraorder: Cucujiformia
- Family: Tenebrionidae
- Genus: Eleodes
- Species: E. grandicollis

Binomial name
- Eleodes grandicollis (Mannerheim, 1843)

= Eleodes grandicollis =

Species of beetle

Eleodes grandicollis is a species of desert stink beetle in the family Tenebrionidae.

== Subspecies ==
These subspecies belong to the species Eleodes grandicollis:

- Eleodes grandicollis grandicollis Mannerheim, 1843
- Eleodes grandicollis valida Boheman, 1858
