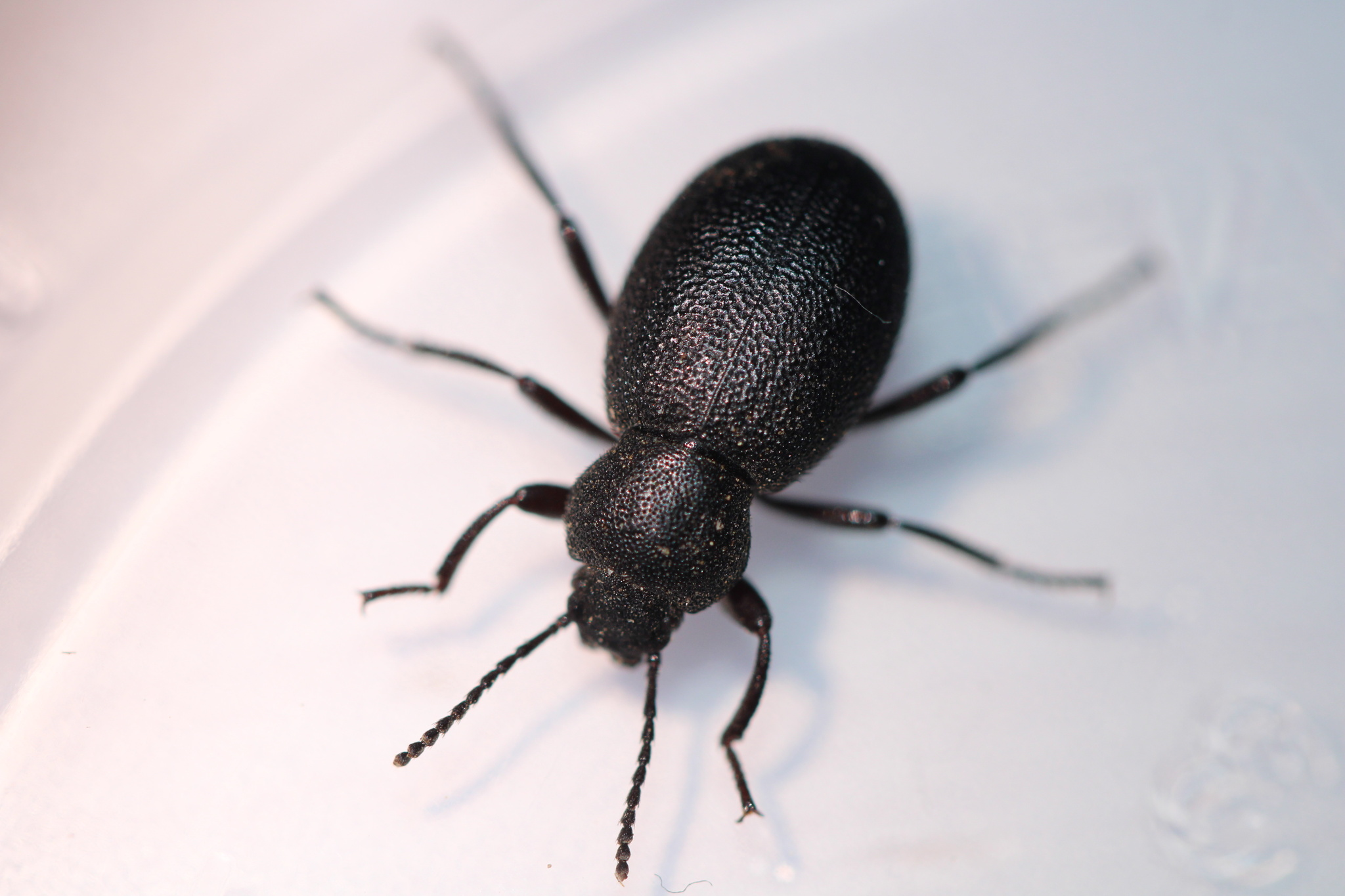

Scientific classification
- Kingdom: Animalia
- Phylum: Arthropoda
- Class: Insecta
- Order: Coleoptera
- Suborder: Polyphaga
- Infraorder: Cucujiformia
- Family: Tenebrionidae
- Genus: Eleodes
- Species: E. caseyi

Binomial name
- Eleodes caseyi Blaisdell, 1909

= Eleodes caseyi =

Species of beetle

Eleodes caseyi is a species of desert stink beetle in the family Tenebrionidae.
