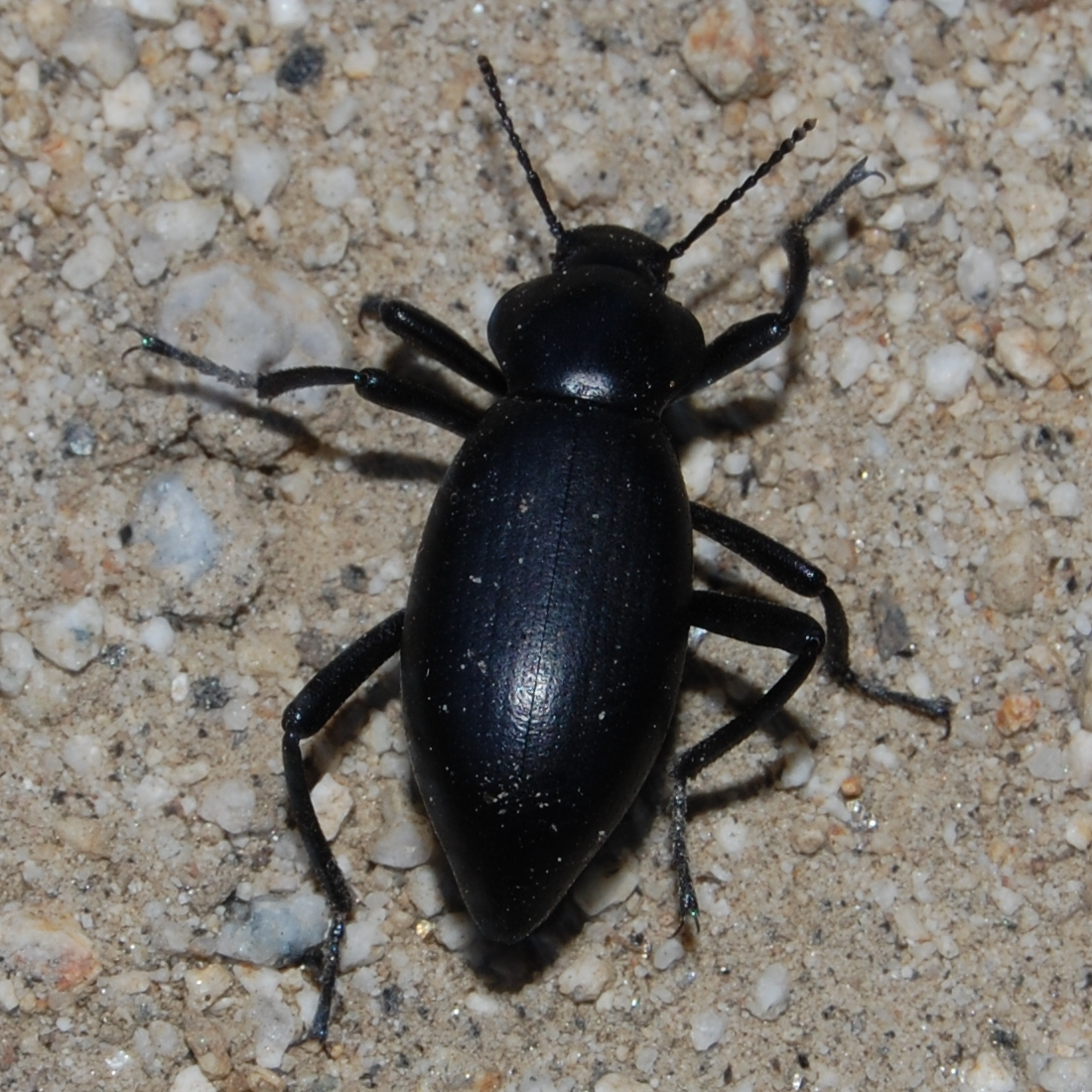

Scientific classification
- Kingdom: Animalia
- Phylum: Arthropoda
- Class: Insecta
- Order: Coleoptera
- Suborder: Polyphaga
- Infraorder: Cucujiformia
- Family: Tenebrionidae
- Genus: Eleodes
- Species: E. dentipes

Binomial name
- Eleodes dentipes Eschscholtz, 1829

= Eleodes dentipes =

Dentate stink beetle

Species of beetle

Eleodes dentipes, the dentate stink beetle, is a species of desert stink beetle in the family Tenebrionidae. It is 16–28 mm in length and common in rotting wood and dry leaves.
