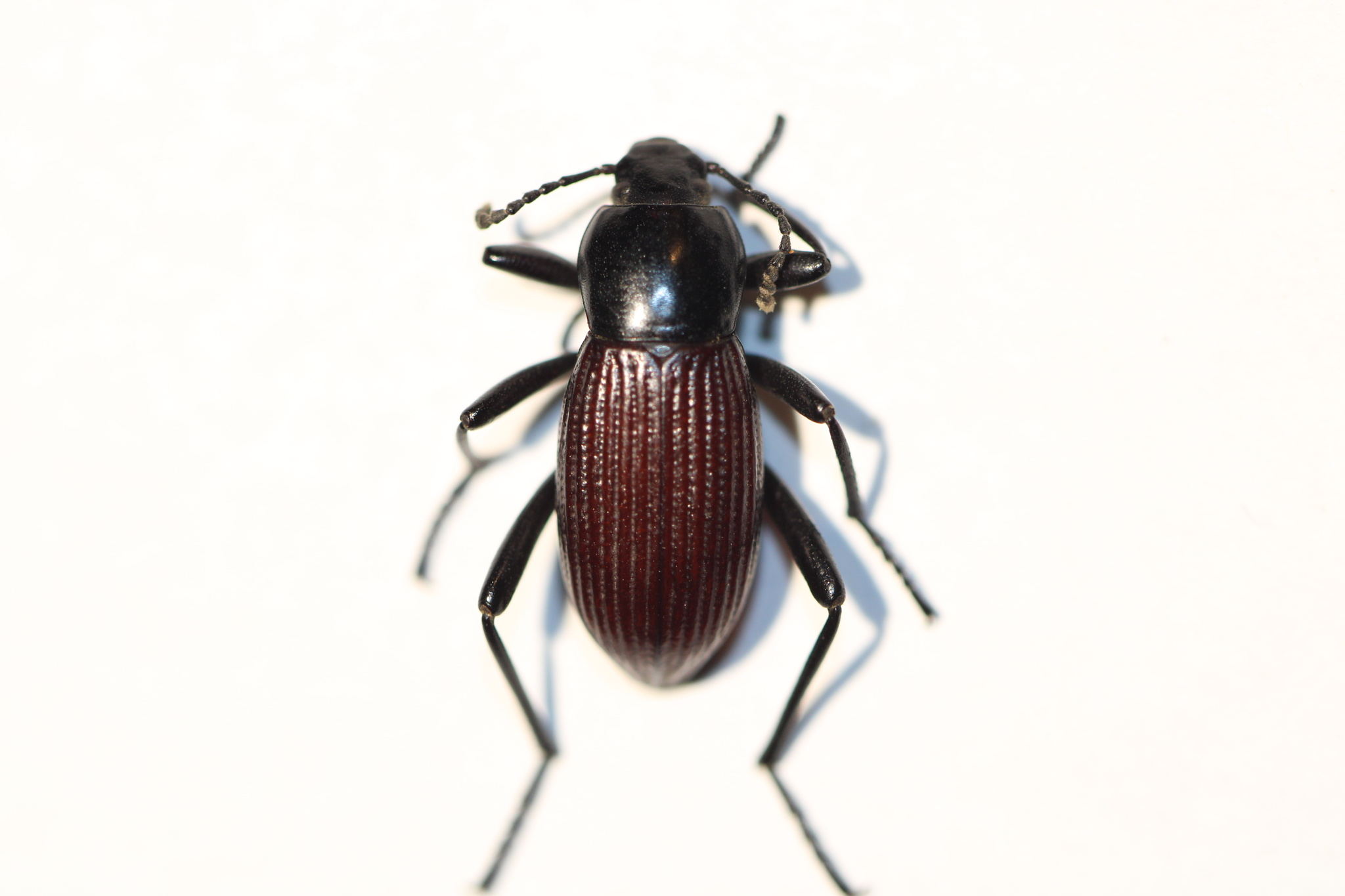
- Eleodes carbonaria obsoleta

Scientific classification
- Kingdom: Animalia
- Phylum: Arthropoda
- Clade: Pancrustacea
- Class: Insecta
- Order: Coleoptera
- Suborder: Polyphaga
- Infraorder: Cucujiformia
- Family: Tenebrionidae
- Genus: Eleodes
- Species: E. carbonaria

Binomial name
- Eleodes carbonaria (Say, 1823)

= Eleodes carbonaria =

Species of beetle

Eleodes carbonaria is a species of desert stink beetle in the family Tenebrionidae.

== Subspecies ==
These subspecies belong to the species Eleodes carbonaria:

- Eleodes carbonaria carbonaria (Say, 1824)
- Eleodes carbonaria chihuahuaensis Champion, 1884
- Eleodes carbonaria disjuncta Triplehorn and Thomas, 2012
- Eleodes carbonaria knausii Blaisdell, 1909
- Eleodes carbonaria nuevoleonensis Triplehorn and Thomas, 2012
- Eleodes carbonaria obsoleta (Say, 1824)
- Eleodes carbonaria omissoides Blaisdell, 1935
- Eleodes carbonaria omissa LeConte, 1858
- Eleodes carbonaria soror LeConte, 1858
