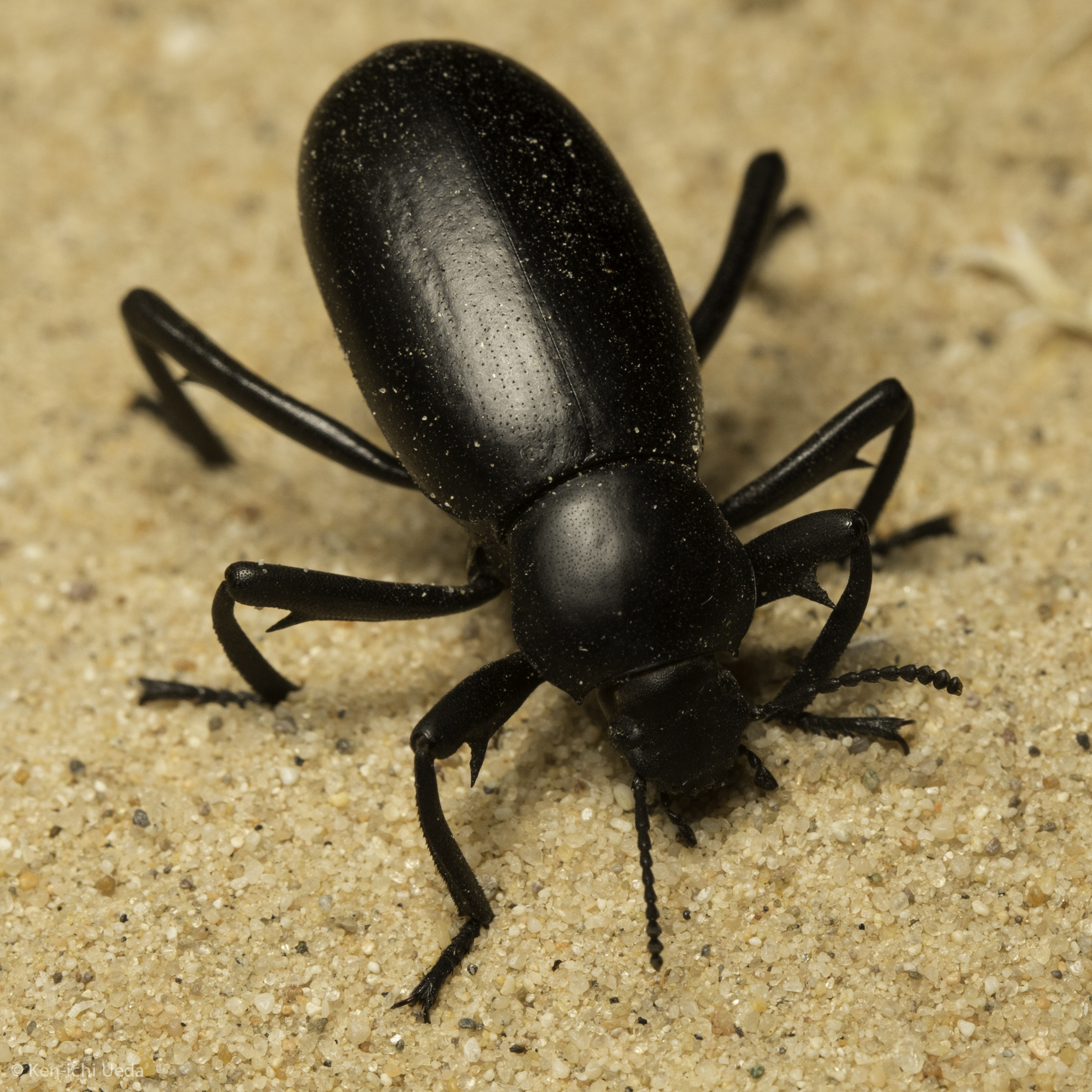
- Eleodes armata

Scientific classification
- Kingdom: Animalia
- Phylum: Arthropoda
- Clade: Pancrustacea
- Class: Insecta
- Order: Coleoptera
- Suborder: Polyphaga
- Infraorder: Cucujiformia
- Family: Tenebrionidae
- Tribe: Amphidorini
- Genus: Eleodes; Eschscholtz, 1829

Type species
- Eleodes dentipes Eschscholtz, 1829

Subgenera
- See text
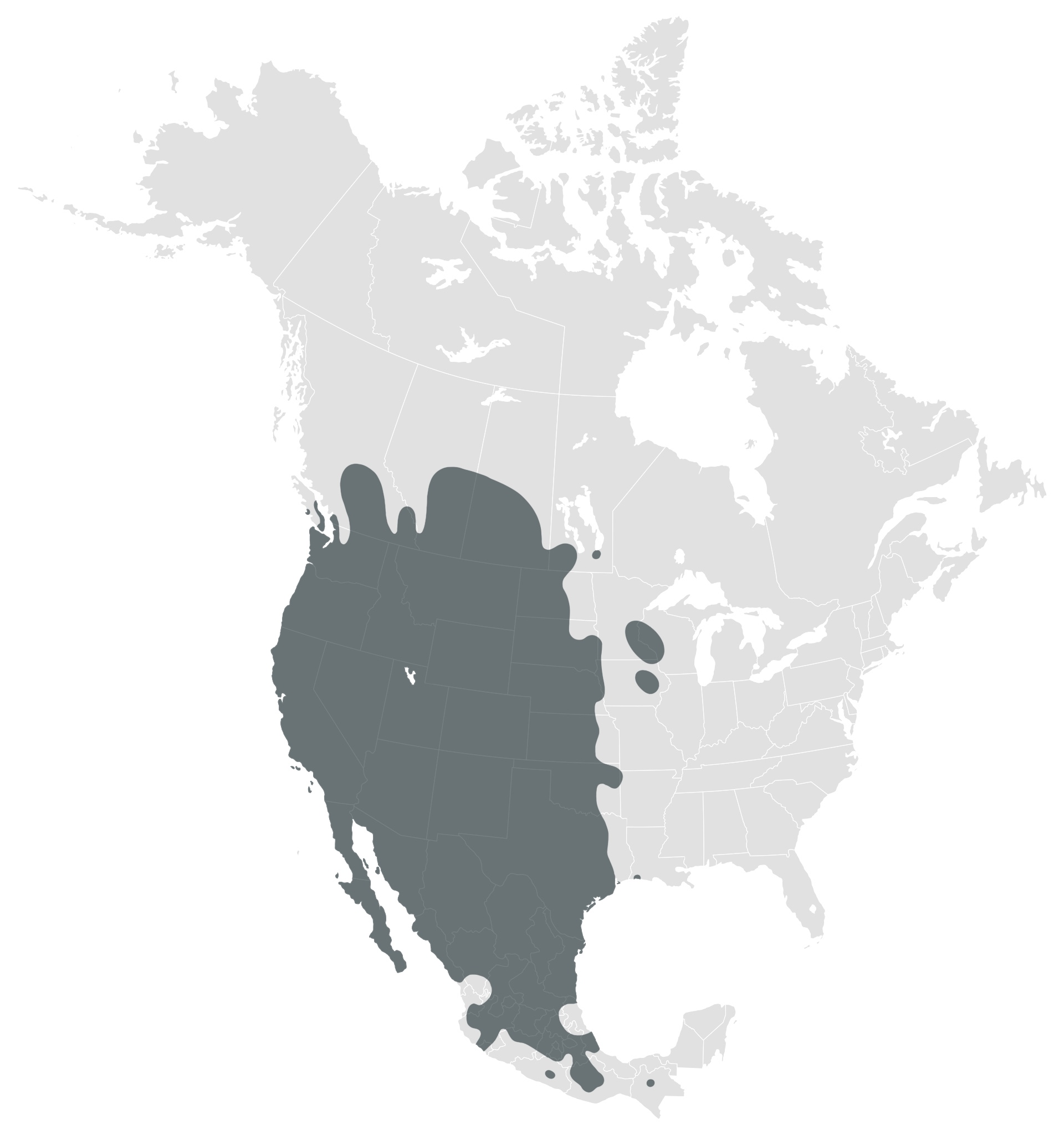
- The native range of Eleodes

= Eleodes =

Desert stink beetle Temporal range: Middle Miocene–Present

Genus of beetles

Eleodes (commonly known as pinacate beetles or desert stink beetles) is a genus of darkling beetles in the family Tenebrionidae. They are endemic to western North America, ranging from southern Canada to central Mexico, with many species found along the Mexico-United States border. Some species have been introduced to Colombia. The name pinacate is Mexican Spanish, derived from the Nahuatl (Aztec) name for the insect, pinacatl, which translates as "black beetle".

Eleodes species range from about 10 to 50 millimetres (0.39 to 1.97 in) in length and are black, with some having a reddish tint on their abdomen. The setae of some species such as Eleodes osculans collect debris and give the insect a brown color, a similar effect occurs in the species Eleodes mirabilis giving it the appearance of having whitish stripes on its abdomen. Due to the number of species and their large range these beetles have a fairly varied appearance throughout the many species. All produce quinone or similar substances as a deterrent to predators, and many will stand on their heads to spray it. They are typically found in the arid desert regions of their range, but can also be found in forests and grasslands. All Eleodes species are flightless as their elytra are fused together and their second pair of wings is very reduced and vestigial.

== Ecology ==
Most members of the genus Eleodes are primarily detrivores feeding on plant and animal debris. Some species are more inclined to consume living plants, which is especially true for species native to the plains of North America, such as Eleodes hispilabris and Eleodes opaca. The larvae of those species and others are considered pests as they feed on the roots of crops.

Species found in dry regions, such as members of the subgenus Eleodes, are usually much larger than what is expected for most insects, this is due the lack of water in the area leading to these beetles evolving larger bodies in order to hold more of it. Water loss is also the reason that the elytra are fused in Eleodes. As expected, species found in forests, such as members of the subgenus Blapylis, are smaller, closer to the size of most other insects.

Eleodes are generally more active at night; some species are strictly nocturnal while others can and will be active during the day. As these beetles are fairly long-lived for insects, they must adapt to the different seasons. During the fall, they are diurnal as it is warmest during the day. When winter comes, they take shelter and become inactive so as not to freeze in the cold. When spring arrives, they go back to being active during the day until the summer when they switch to being active at night to survive the deadly high temperatures of the desert. Eleodes take shelter almost anywhere that can protect them from the hot and cold. This can be wood or rocks, but is often rodent burrows. Every night when these beetles scavenge for food, they pick a new shelter for the day, which, if not suitable for protection against the elements, will be abandoned in search of a new one. One subgenus, Caverneleodes, lives only in caves, cave-like environments, or rock crevices. These beetles have reduced eyesight and only leave their hideouts to scavenge for food.

=== Chemical defense ===
Beetles within Eleodes and other genera within Tenebrionidae exude a foul-smelling odor and a very distasteful liquid from glands to ward off predators. This liquid is most commonly a quinone. While not being poisonous the liquid does usually deter predators, the success of this defense mechanism has led to the evolution of a Müllerian mimicry complex among Eleodes acuticauda, Eleodes dentipes, and Coelocnemis magna, the latter of which while not being within Eleodes is a still distasteful prey item. All three previously mentioned species look strikingly similar, leading to a strengthened defense against potential predators. Another Müllerian mimicry complex exists between Eleodes scabrosa and Eleodes tuberculata. The "head-standing" behavior exhibited by these beetles is aposematic. By leaving their presence and identity unambiguous to potential predators, more individuals can survive, as predators will avoid beetles with the "head-standing" behavior.

While this defense is generally effective in deterring predators, they are still preyed upon by many species, such as owls, foxes, coyotes, skunks, bats, turtles, etc.

== Fossil record and evolution ==
Fossils of Eleodes acuticauda, Eleodes osculans, Eleodes carbonaria, Eleodes granulata, Eleodes gracilis, and others have been found in the La Brea Tar Pits, Carpinteria Tar Pits, and the Snowmastodon Site which are all dated to the Pleistocene epoch. Eleodes split off from the rest of Amphidorini at least 8 to 15 million years ago in the Miocene, although this estimate is likely on the lower side due to low taxon sampling.

== Taxonomy ==
Eleodes is the largest New World genus of darkling beetles comprising around 200 species divided up into the following 17 subgenera. (Note: The subgenera and species within Eleodes are extremely likely to change in the coming years. This list is accurate as to what is defined in Bousquet et al. (2018).)

Subgenera:

- Subgenus Amphidora Eschscholtz, 1829
  - Eleodes littoralis Eschscholtz, 1829
  - Eleodes nigropilosa LeConte, 1851
  - Eleodes subdeplanta Blaisdell, 1943
- Subgenus Ardeleodes
  - Eleodes tibialis Blaisdell, 1909
- Subgenus Blapylis Horn, 1870
  - Eleodes alticola Blaisdell, 1925
  - Eleodes aristata Somerby, 1977
  - Eleodes bishopensis Somerby and Doyen, 1976
  - Eleodes blanchardii Blaisdell, 1909
  - Eleodes brunnipes Casey, 1890
  - Eleodes caseyi Blaisdell, 1909
  - Eleodes clavicornis Eschscholtz, 1829
  - Eleodes consobrina LeConte, 1851
  - Eleodes constricta LeConte, 1858
  - Eleodes cooperi Somerby and Doyen, 1976
  - Eleodes cordata Eschscholtz, 1829
  - Eleodes fuchsii Blaisdell, 1909
  - Eleodes hoppingii Blaisdell, 1909
  - Eleodes hornii Blaisdell, 1909
  - Eleodes hybrida Blaisdell, 1917
  - Eleodes inculta LeConte, 1861
  - Eleodes kaweana Blaisdell, 1933
  - Eleodes lariversi Somerby and Doyen, 1976
  - Eleodes lecontei Horn, 1870
  - Eleodes manni Blaisdell, 1917
  - Eleodes nana Blaisdell, 1909
  - Eleodes neotomae Blaisdell, 1909
  - Eleodes novoverrucula Boddy, 1957
  - Eleodes nunenmacheri Blaisdell, 1918
  - Eleodes oregona Blaisdell, 1941
  - Eleodes orophila Somerby, 1977
  - Eleodes panamintensis Somerby, 1977
  - Eleodes parvicollis Eschscholtz, 1829
  - Eleodes patulicollis Blaisdell, 1932
  - Eleodes pimelioides Mannerheim, 1843
  - Eleodes planata Eschscholtz, 1829
  - Eleodes producta Mannerheim, 1843
  - Eleodes propinqua Blaisdell, 1918
  - Eleodes robinetti Boddy, 1957
  - Eleodes rotundipennis LeConte, 1857
  - Eleodes scabripennis LeConte, 1859
  - Eleodes scabriventris Blaisdell, 1932
  - Eleodes scabrosa Eschscholtz, 1829
  - Eleodes schlingeri Somerby and Doyen, 1976
  - Eleodes schwarzii Blaisdell, 1909
  - Eleodes snowii Blaisdell, 1909
  - Eleodes spilmani Somerby and Doyen, 1976
  - Eleodes strumosa Blaisdell, 1932
  - Eleodes subvestita (Blaisdell, 1939)
  - Eleodes tenebrosa Horn, 1870
  - Eleodes triplehorni Somerby and Doyen, 1976
  - Eleodes trita Blaisdell, 1917
  - Eleodes tuberculata Eschscholtz, 1829
  - Eleodes versatilis Blaisdell, 1921
  - Eleodes volcanensis Somerby, 1977
  - Eleodes wakelandi Somerby, 1977
- Subgenus Caverneleodes Triplehorn, 1975
  - Eleodes easterlai Triplehorn, 1975
  - Eleodes gruta Aalbu, Smith & Triplehorn, 2012
  - Eleodes guadalpensis Aalbu, Smith & Triplehorn, 2012
  - Eleodes labialis Triplehorn, 1975
  - Eleodes leptoscelis Triplehorn, 1975
  - Eleodes microps Aalbu, Smith & Triplehorn, 2012
  - Eleodes reddelli Triplehorn, 2007
  - Eleodes rugosifrons Triplehorn & Reddell, 1991
  - Eleodes sprousei Triplehorn & Reddell, 1991
  - Eleodes thomasi Aalbu, Smith & Triplehorn, 2012
  - Eleodes wheeleri Aalbu, Smith & Triplehorn, 2012
  - Eleodes wynnei Aalbu, Smith & Triplehorn, 2012
- Subgenus Chaseleodes Thomas, 2015
  - Eleodes connata Solier, 1848
  - Eleodes curta Champion, 1884
- Subgenus Cratidus LeConte, 1862
  - Eleodes osculans LeConte, 1851
  - Eleodes ursus Triplehorn, 1996
- Subgenus Discogenia LeConte, 1866
  - Eleodes acutangula Blaisdell, 1921
  - Eleodes marginata Eschscholtz, 1829
  - Eleodes scabricula LeConte, 1858
- Subgenus Eleodes Eschscholtz, 1829
  - Eleodes acuta (Say, 1824)
  - Eleodes acuticauda LeConte, 1851
  - Eleodes adumbrata Blaisdell, 1925
  - Eleodes armata LeConte, 1851
  - Eleodes curvidens Triplehorn & Cifuentes-Ruiz, 2011
  - Eleodes dentipes Eschscholtz, 1829
  - Eleodes discincta Blaisdell, 1925
  - Eleodes eschscholtzii Solier, 1848
  - Eleodes femorata LeConte, 1851
  - Eleodes fiski Triplehorn, 2015
  - Eleodes gracilis LeConte, 1858
  - Eleodes grandicollis Mannerheim, 1843
  - Eleodes hispilabris (Say, 1824)
  - Eleodes loretensis Blaisdell, 1923
  - Eleodes mexicana Blaisdell, 1943
  - Eleodes mirabilis Triplehorn, 2007
  - Eleodes moesta Blaisdell, 1921
  - Eleodes muricatula Triplehorn, 2007
  - Eleodes obscura (Say, 1824)
  - Eleodes rossi Blaisdell, 1943
  - Eleodes rugosa Perbosc, 1839
  - Eleodes samalayucae Triplehorn, 2007
  - Eleodes sanmartinensis Blaisdell, 1921
  - Eleodes scyroptera Triplehorn, 2007
  - Eleodes spinipes Solier, 1848
  - Eleodes sponsa LeConte, 1858
  - Eleodes subcylindrica Casey, 1890
  - Eleodes suturalis (Say, 1824)
  - Eleodes tenuipes Casey, 1890
  - Eleodes vanduzeei Blaisdell, 1923
- Subgenus Heteropromus Blaisdell, 1909
  - Eleodes veterator Horn, 1874
- Subgenus Litheleodes Blaisdell, 1909
  - Eleodes arcuata Casey, 1884
  - Eleodes aspera LeConte, 1866
  - Eleodes corvina Blaisdell, 1921
  - Eleodes extricata (Say, 1824)
  - Eleodes granulata LeConte, 1857
  - Eleodes hirtipennis Triplehorn, 1964
  - Eleodes letcheri Blaisdell, 1909
  - Eleodes papillosa Blaisdell, 1917
  - Eleodes subtuberculata Walker, 1866
- Subgenus Melaneleodes Blaisdell, 1909
  - Eleodes tricostata (Say, 1824)
  - Eleodes neomexicana Blaisdell, 1909
  - Eleodes pedinoides LeConte, 1858
  - Eleodes wenzeli Blaisdell, 1925
  - Eleodes parowana Blaisdell, 1925
  - Eleodes halli Blaisdell, 1941
  - Eleodes carbonaria (Say, 1824)
  - Eleodes quadricollis Eschscholtz, 1829
  - Eleodes anthracina Blaisdell, 1909
  - Eleodes humeralis LeConte, 1857
  - Eleodes rileyi Casey, 1891
  - Eleodes rufipes Pierre, 1976
- Subgenus Metablapylis Blaisdell, 1909
  - Eleodes aalbui Triplehorn, 2007
  - Eleodes californica Blaisdell, 1929
  - Eleodes delicata Blaisdell, 1929
  - Eleodes dissimilis Blaisdell, 1909
  - Eleodes nevadensis Blaisdell, 1909
  - Eleodes nigrina LeConte, 1858
- Subgenus Omegeleodes Triplehorn & Thomas, 2011
  - Eleodes debilis LeConte, 1858
- Subgenus Promus LeConte, 1862
  - Eleodes anachronus Triplehorn, 2010
  - Eleodes bidens Triplehorn, 2007
  - Eleodes brucei Triplehorn, 2007
  - Eleodes calcarata Champion, 1884
  - Eleodes composita Casey, 1891
  - Eleodes erratica Champion, 1884
  - Eleodes exarata Champion, 1884
  - Eleodes fusiformis LeConte, 1858
  - Eleodes goryi Solier, 1848
  - Eleodes hoegei Champion, 1884
  - Eleodes insularis Linell, 1899
  - Eleodes knullorum Triplehorn, 1971
  - Eleodes longicornis Champion, 1884
  - Eleodes madrensis Johnston, 2015
  - Eleodes montana Champion, 1884
  - Eleodes opaca (Say, 1824)
  - Eleodes spiculifera Triplehorn, 2007
  - Eleodes spinolae Solier, 1848
  - Eleodes striolata LeConte, 1858
  - Eleodes subnitens LeConte, 1851
  - Eleodes watrousi Triplehorn, 2007
- Subgenus Pseudeleodes Blaisdell, 1909
  - Eleodes caudifera LeConte, 1858
  - Eleodes granosa LeConte, 1866
  - Eleodes inornata Johnston, 2016
  - Eleodes leechi Tanner, 1961
  - Eleodes longipilosa Horn, 1891
  - Eleodes pilosa Horn, 1870
  - Eleodes spoliata Blaisdell, 1933
  - Eleodes tribulus Thomas, 2005
- Subgenus Steneleodes Blaisdell, 1909
  - Eleodes angulata (Eschscholtz, 1829)
  - Eleodes angusta Eschscholtz, 1829
  - Eleodes blapoides Eschscholtz, 1829
  - Eleodes coarctata Champion, 1885
  - Eleodes corrugans Triplehorn, 2007
  - Eleodes distincta Solier, 1848
  - Eleodes forreri Champion, 1884
  - Eleodes gigantea Mannerheim, 1843
  - Eleodes glabricollis Champion, 1884
  - Eleodes gravida (Eschscholtz, 1829)
  - Eleodes hepburni Champion, 1884
  - Eleodes innocens LeConte, 1866
  - Eleodes laevigata Solier, 1848
  - Eleodes longicollis LeConte, 1851
  - Eleodes mutilata Blaisdell, 1921
  - Eleodes olida Champion, 1892
  - Eleodes ornatipennis Blaisdell, 1937
  - Eleodes peropaca Champion, 1892
  - Eleodes platypennis Triplehorn, 2007
  - Eleodes ponderosa Champion, 1884
  - Eleodes punctigera Blaisdell, 1935
  - Eleodes ruida (Say, 1835)
  - Eleodes sallaei Champion, 1885
  - Eleodes solieri Champion, 1885
  - Eleodes stolida Champion, 1885
  - Eleodes sulcatula Champion, 1884
  - Eleodes tenebricosa Gemminger, 1870
  - Eleodes tessellata Champion, 1892
- Subgenus Tricheleodes Blaisdell, 1909
  - Eleodes hirsuta LeConte, 1861

Incertae sedis:

  - Eleodes aequalis (Say, 1835)
  - Eleodes amaura Champion, 1892
  - Eleodes barbata Wickham, 1918
  - Eleodes brevicollis Gemminger, 1870
  - Eleodes cylindrica (Herbst, 1799)
  - Eleodes dilaticollis Champion, 1884
  - Eleodes ebenina (Solier, 1848)
  - Eleodes elongatula Eschscholtz, 1829
  - Eleodes impolita (Say, 1835)
  - Eleodes maura (Say, 1835)
  - Eleodes melanaria Eschscholtz, 1829
  - Eleodes obliterata (Say, 1835)
  - Eleodes polita Champion, 1892
  - Eleodes rotundicollis (Eschscholtz, 1829)
  - Eleodes scapularis Champion, 1884
  - Eleodes segregata Champion, 1892
  - Eleodes striata (Guérin-Méneville, 1834)
  - Eleodes sulcata (Eschscholtz, 1829)

== See also ==
- List of Eleodes species
- El Pinacate y Gran Desierto de Altar Biosphere Reserve
- Darkling beetle
