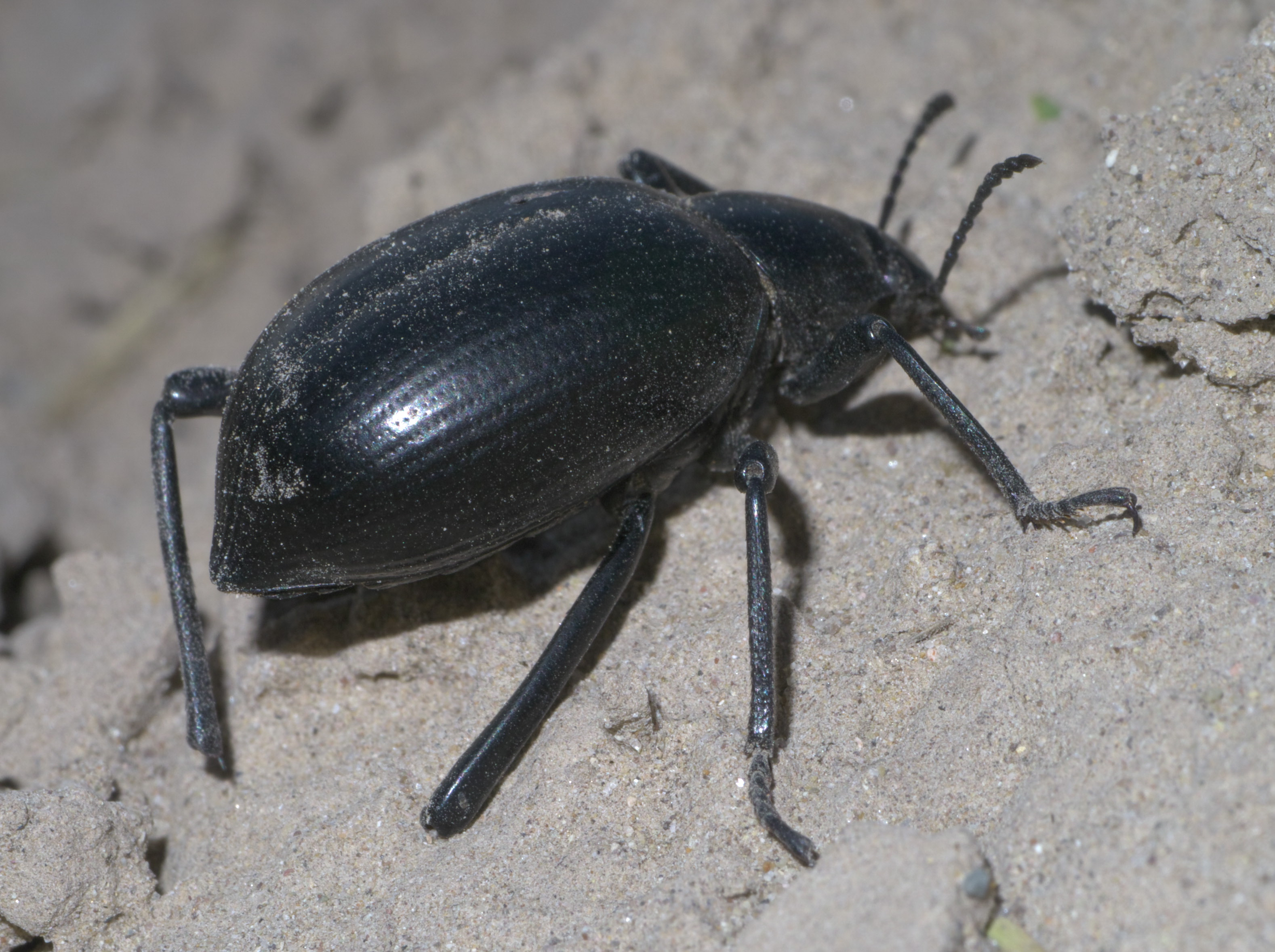

Scientific classification
- Kingdom: Animalia
- Phylum: Arthropoda
- Class: Insecta
- Order: Coleoptera
- Suborder: Polyphaga
- Infraorder: Cucujiformia
- Family: Tenebrionidae
- Genus: Eleodes
- Species: E. spinipes

Binomial name
- Eleodes spinipes Solier, 1848

= Eleodes spinipes =

Species of beetle

Eleodes spinipes is a species of desert stink beetle in the family Tenebrionidae.

== Subspecies ==
These subspecies belong to the species Eleodes spinipes:

- Eleodes spinipes macrura Champion, 1892
- Eleodes spinipes spinipes Solier, 1848
- Eleodes spinipes ventricosa LeConte, 1858
