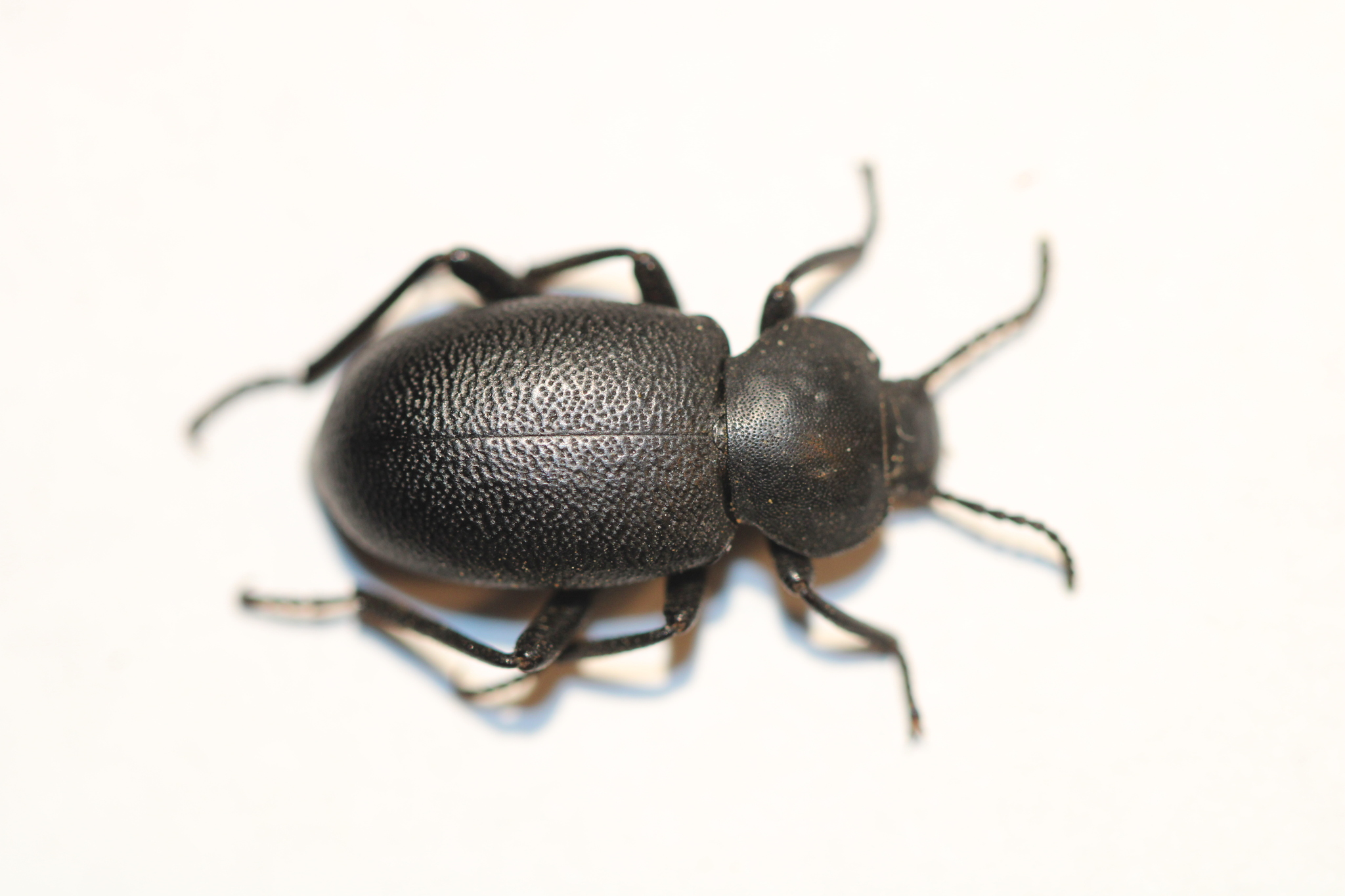

Scientific classification
- Kingdom: Animalia
- Phylum: Arthropoda
- Class: Insecta
- Order: Coleoptera
- Suborder: Polyphaga
- Infraorder: Cucujiformia
- Family: Tenebrionidae
- Genus: Eleodes
- Species: E. producta

Binomial name
- Eleodes producta Mannerheim, 1843

= Eleodes producta =

Species of beetle

Eleodes producta is a species of desert stink beetle in the family Tenebrionidae. It is found in western North America, including California.
