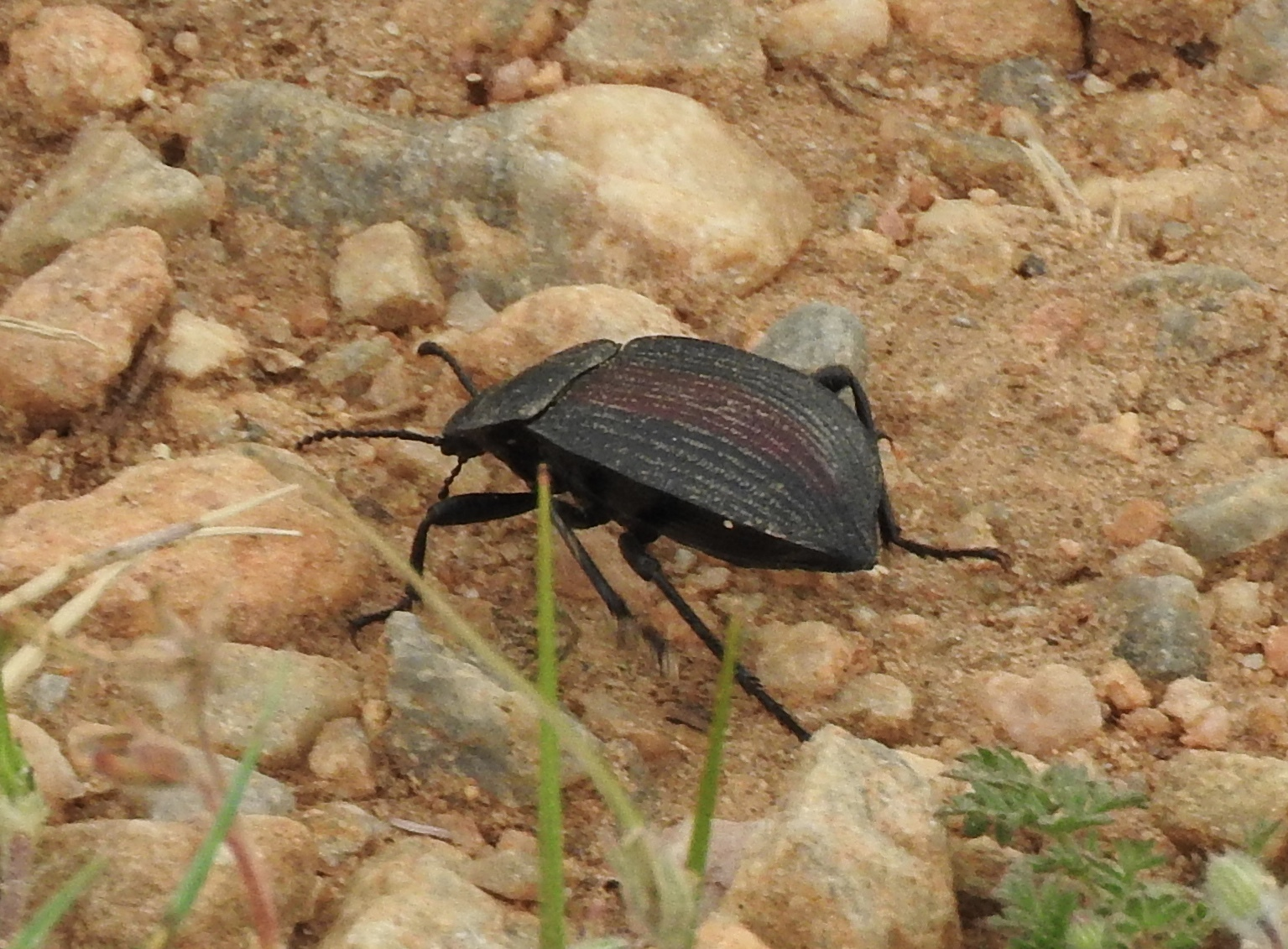

Scientific classification
- Kingdom: Animalia
- Phylum: Arthropoda
- Class: Insecta
- Order: Coleoptera
- Suborder: Polyphaga
- Infraorder: Cucujiformia
- Family: Tenebrionidae
- Genus: Eleodes
- Species: E. suturalis

Binomial name
- Eleodes suturalis (Say, 1823)

Synonyms
- Blaps suturalis Say, 1823; Eleodes texana LeConte, 1858

= Eleodes suturalis =

Red-backed darkling beetle

Species of beetle

Eleodes suturalis is a species of darkling beetle. As currently known, it is endemic to the United States. Their range extends from South Dakota to Texas and west to southwestern Wyoming, Colorado, New Mexico, and extreme southeastern Arizona, and probably into Mexico. Males measure 25–36 mm (1.0–1.4 in) and females 21.5–33.5 mm (0.8–1.3 in) in length. They can be easily identified by the distinctive red stripe which goes down the center of their flat elytra.

== Ecology ==
Like other members of the genus Eleodes, when these beetles feel threatened they raise their abdomen into the air and secrete a foul smelling liquid. Both the larva and adults are herbivorous in nature, eating the seeds of various plants.
