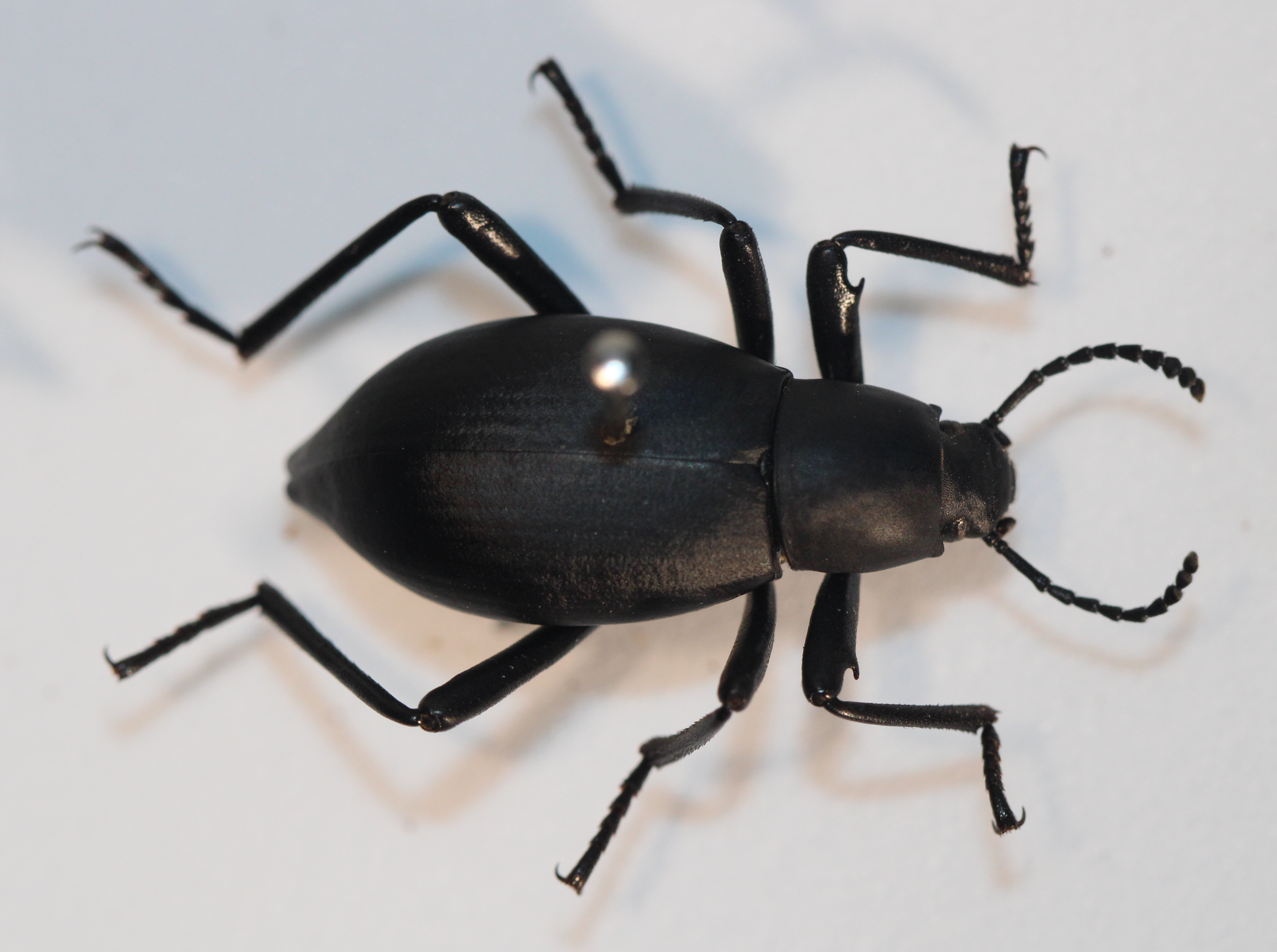

Scientific classification
- Kingdom: Animalia
- Phylum: Arthropoda
- Class: Insecta
- Order: Coleoptera
- Suborder: Polyphaga
- Infraorder: Cucujiformia
- Family: Tenebrionidae
- Genus: Eleodes
- Species: E. subnitens

Binomial name
- Eleodes subnitens LeConte, 1851

= Eleodes subnitens =

Species of beetle

Eleodes subnitens is a species of desert stink beetle in the family Tenebrionidae.
