= List of Eleodes species =

This is a list of species in the darkling beetle genus Eleodes.

== Eleodes species ==
- Eleodes aalbui Triplehorn, 2007
- Eleodes acuta (Say, 1824)
- Eleodes acutangula Blaisdell, 1921
- Eleodes acuticauda LeConte, 1851
- Eleodes adumbrata Blaisdell, 1925
- Eleodes aequalis (Say, 1835)
- Eleodes alticola Blaisdell, 1925
- Eleodes amaura Champion, 1892
- Eleodes anachronus Triplehorn, 201035
- Eleodes angulata (Eschscholtz, 1829)
- Eleodes angusta Eschscholtz, 1829
- Eleodes anthracina Blaisdell, 1909
- Eleodes arcuata Casey, 1884
- Eleodes aristata Somerby, 1977
- Eleodes armata LeConte, 1851 (armored stink beetle)
- Eleodes aspera LeConte, 1866
- Eleodes barbata Wickham, 1918
- Eleodes bidens Triplehorn, 2007
- Eleodes bishopensis Somerby & Doyen, 1976
- Eleodes blanchardii Blaisdell, 1909
- Eleodes blapoides Eschscholtz, 1829
- Eleodes brevicollis Gemminger, 1870
- Eleodes brucei Triplehorn, 2007
- Eleodes brunnipes Casey, 1890
- Eleodes calcarata Champion, 1884
- Eleodes californica Blaisdell, 1929
- Eleodes carbonaria (Say, 1824)
- Eleodes caseyi Blaisdell, 1909
- Eleodes caudifera LeConte, 1858
- Eleodes clavicornis Eschscholtz, 1829
- Eleodes coarctata Champion, 1885
- Eleodes composita Casey, 1891
- Eleodes connata Solier, 1848
- Eleodes consobrina LeConte, 1851
- Eleodes constricta LeConte, 1858
- Eleodes cooperi Somerby & Doyen, 1976
- Eleodes cordata Eschscholtz, 1829
- Eleodes corrugans Triplehorn, 2007
- Eleodes corvina Blaisdell, 1921
- Eleodes curta Champion, 1884
- Eleodes curvidens Triplehorn & Cifuentes-Ruiz, 2011
- Eleodes debilis LeC4onte, 1858
- Eleodes delicata Blaisdell, 1929
- Eleodes dentipes Eschscholtz, 1829 (dentate stink beetle)
- Eleodes dilaticollis Champion, 1884
- Eleodes discincta Blaisdell, 1925
- Eleodes dissimilis Blaisdell, 1909
- Eleodes distincta Solier, 1848
- Eleodes easterlai Triplehorn, 1975
- Eleodes ebenina (Solier, 1848)
- Eleodes elongatula Eschscholtz, 1829
- Eleodes erratica Champion, 1884
- Eleodes eschscholtzii Solier, 1848
- Eleodes exarata Champion, 1884
- Eleodes extricata (Say, 1824)
- Eleodes femorata LeConte, 1851
- Eleodes fiski Triplehorn, 2015
- Eleodes forreri Champion, 1884
- Eleodes fuchsii Blaisdell, 1909
- Eleodes fusiformis LeConte, 1858
- Eleodes gigantea Mannerheim, 1843
- Eleodes glabricollis Champion, 1884
- Eleodes goryi Solier, 1848
- Eleodes gracilis LeConte, 1858
- Eleodes grandicollis Mannerheim, 1843
- Eleodes granosa LeConte, 1866
- Eleodes granulata LeConte, 1857
- Eleodes gravida (Eschscholtz, 1829)
- Eleodes grutus Aalbu, Smith & Triplehorn, 201232
- Eleodes guadalupensis Aalbu, Smith & Triplehorn, 2012
- Eleodes halli Blaisdell, 1941
- Eleodes hepburni Champion, 1884
- Eleodes hirsuta LeConte, 1861
- Eleodes hirtipennis Triplehorn, 1964
- Eleodes hispilabris (Say, 1824)
- Eleodes hoegei Champion, 1885
- Eleodes hoppingii Blaisdell, 1909
- Eleodes hornii Blaisdell, 1909
- Eleodes humeralis LeConte, 1857
- Eleodes hybrida Blaisdell, 1917
- Eleodes impolita (Say, 1835)
- Eleodes inculta LeConte, 1861 (island darkling beetle)
- Eleodes innocens LeConte, 1866
- Eleodes inornata Johnston, 2016
- Eleodes insularis Linell, 1899
- Eleodes kaweana Blaisdell, 1933
- Eleodes knullorum Triplehorn, 1971
- Eleodes labialis Triplehorn, 1975
- Eleodes laevigata Solier, 1848
- Eleodes lariversi Somerby & Doyen, 1976
- Eleodes lecontei Horn, 1870
- Eleodes leechi Tanner, 1961
- Eleodes leptoscelis Triplehorn, 1975
- Eleodes letcheri Blaisdell, 1909
- Eleodes littoralis (Eschscholtz, 1829)
- Eleodes longicollis LeConte, 1851
- Eleodes longicornis Champion, 1884
- Eleodes longipilosa Horn, 1891
- Eleodes loretensis Blaisdell, 1923
- Eleodes madrensis Johnston, 2015
- Eleodes manni Blaisdell, 1917
- Eleodes marginata Eschscholtz, 1829
- Eleodes maura (Say, 1835)
- Eleodes melanaria Eschscholtz, 1829
- Eleodes mexicana Blaisdell, 1943
- Eleodes microps Aalbu, Smith & Triplehorn, 2012
- Eleodes mirabilis Triplehorn, 2007
- Eleodes moesta Blaisdell, 1921
- Eleodes montana Champion, 1884
- Eleodes muricatula Triplehorn, 2007
- Eleodes mutilata Blaisdell, 1921
- Eleodes nana Blaisdell, 1909
- Eleodes neomexicana Blaisdell, 1909
- Eleodes neotomae Blaisdell, 1909
- Eleodes nevadensis Blaisdell, 1909
- Eleodes nigrina LeConte, 1858
- Eleodes nigropilosa (LeConte, 1851)
- Eleodes novoverrucula Boddy, 1957
- Eleodes nunenmacheri Blaisdell, 1918
- Eleodes obliterata (Say, 1835)
- Eleodes obscura (Say, 1824)
- Eleodes olida Champion, 1892
- Eleodes opaca (Say, 1824) (plains false wireworm)
- Eleodes oregona Blaisdell, 1941
- Eleodes ornatipennis Blaisdell, 1937
- Eleodes orophila Somerby, 1977
- Eleodes osculans (LeConte, 1851) (wooly darkling beetle)
- Eleodes panamintensis Somerby, 1977
- Eleodes papillosa Blaisdell, 1917
- Eleodes parowana Blaisdell, 1925
- Eleodes parvicollis Eschscholtz, 1829
- Eleodes patulicollis Blaisdell, 1932
- Eleodes pedinoides LeConte, 1858
- Eleodes peropaca Champion, 1892
- Eleodes pilosa Horn, 1870
- Eleodes pimelioides Mannerheim, 1843
- Eleodes planata Eschscholtz, 1829
- Eleodes platypennis Triplehorn, 2007
- Eleodes polita Champion, 1892
- Eleodes ponderosa Champion, 1884
- Eleodes producta Mannerheim, 1843
- Eleodes propinqua Blaisdell, 1918
- Eleodes punctigera Blaisdell, 1935
- Eleodes quadricollis Eschscholtz, 1829
- Eleodes reddelli Triplehorn, 2007
- Eleodes rileyi Casey, 1891
- Eleodes robinetti Boddy, 1957
- Eleodes rossi Blaisdell, 1943
- Eleodes rotundicollis (Eschscholtz, 1829)
- Eleodes rotundipennis LeConte, 1857
- Eleodes rufipes Pierre, 1976
- Eleodes rugosa Perbosc, 1839
- Eleodes rugosifrons Triplehorn & Reddell, 1991
- Eleodes ruida (Say, 1835)
- Eleodes sallaei Champion, 1885
- Eleodes samalayucae Triplehorn, 2007
- Eleodes sanmartinensis Blaisdell, 1921
- Eleodes scabricula LeConte, 1858
- Eleodes scabripennis LeConte, 1859
- Eleodes scabriventris Blaisdell, 1933
- Eleodes scabrosa Eschscholtz, 1829
- Eleodes scapularis Champion, 1884
- Eleodes schlingeri Somerby & Doyen, 1976
- Eleodes schwarzii Blaisdell, 1909
- Eleodes scyroptera Triplehorn, 2007
- Eleodes segregata Champion, 1892
- Eleodes snowii Blaisdell, 1909
- Eleodes solieri Champion, 1885
- Eleodes spiculifera Triplehorn, 2007
- Eleodes spilmani Somerby & Doyen, 1976
- Eleodes spinipes Solier, 1848
- Eleodes spinolae Solier, 1848
- Eleodes spoliata Blaisdell, 1933
- Eleodes sponsa LeConte, 1858
- Eleodes sprousei Triplehorn & Reddell, 1991
- Eleodes stolida Champion, 1885
- Eleodes striata (Guérin-Méneville, 1834)
- Eleodes striolata LeConte, 1858
- Eleodes strumosa Blaisdell, 1932
- Eleodes subcylindrica Casey, 1890
- Eleodes subdeplanata (Blaisdell, 1943)
- Eleodes subnitens LeConte, 1851
- Eleodes subtuberculata Walker, 1866
- Eleodes subvestita (Blaisdell, 1939)
- Eleodes sulcata (Eschscholtz, 1829)
- Eleodes sulcatula Champion, 1884
- Eleodes suturalis (Say, 1824) (red-backed darkling beetle)
- Eleodes tenebricosa Gemminger, 1870
- Eleodes tenebrosa Horn, 1870
- Eleodes tenuipes Casey, 1890
- Eleodes tessellata Champion, 1892
- Eleodes thomasi Aalbu, Smith & Triplehorn, 2012
- Eleodes tibialis Blaisdell, 1909
- Eleodes tribulus Thomas, 2005
- Eleodes tricostata (Say, 1824)
- Eleodes triplehorni Somerby & Doyen, 1976
- Eleodes trita Blaisdell, 1917
- Eleodes tuberculata Eschscholtz, 1829
- Eleodes ursus Triplehorn, 1996
- Eleodes vanduzeei Blaisdell, 1923
- Eleodes versatilis Blaisdell, 1921
- Eleodes veterator Horn, 187433
- Eleodes volcanensis Somerby, 1977
- Eleodes wakelandi Somerby, 1977
- Eleodes watrousi Triplehorn, 2007
- Eleodes wenzeli Blaisdell, 1925
- Eleodes wheeleri Aalbu, Smith & Triplehorn, 2012
- Eleodes wynnei Aalbu, Smith & Triplehorn, 2012
