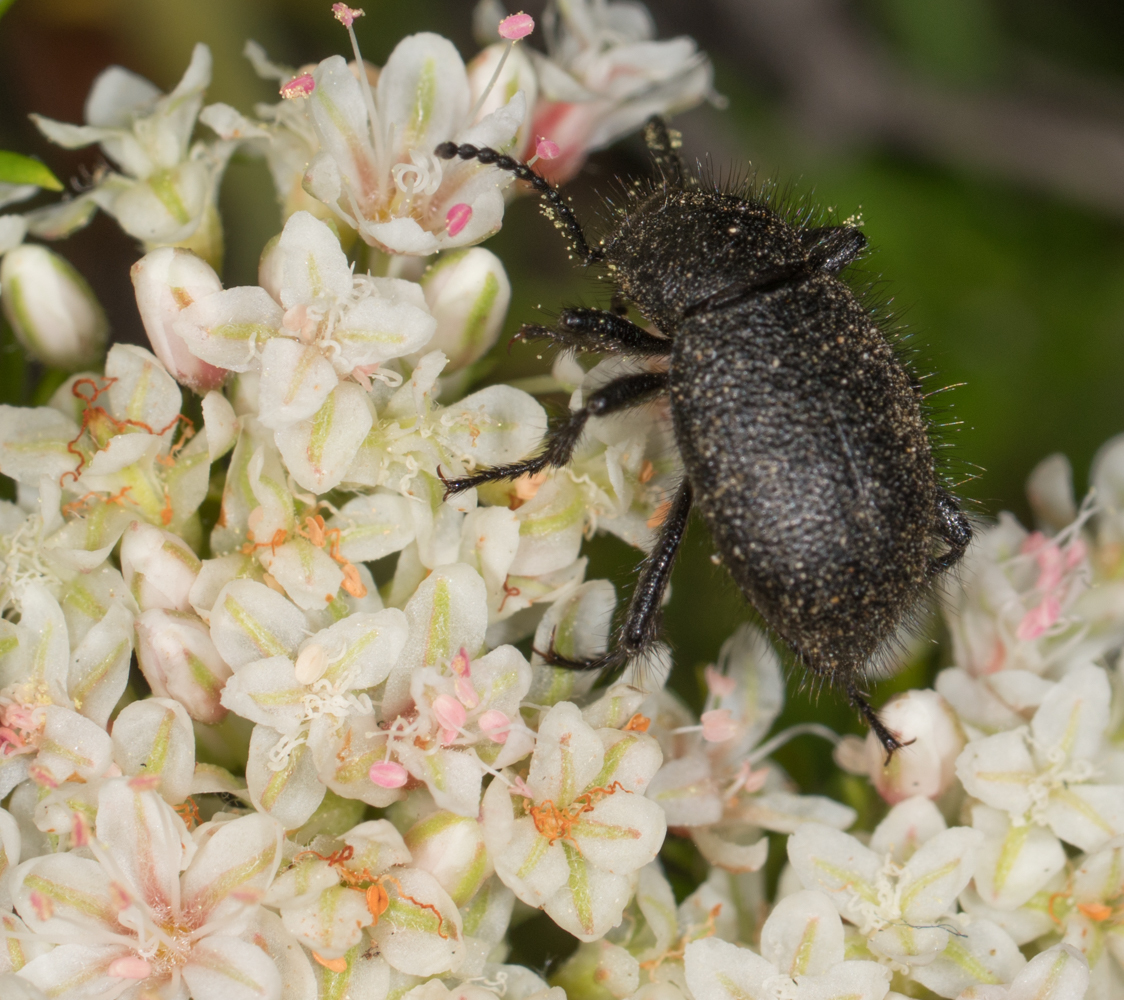

Scientific classification
- Kingdom: Animalia
- Phylum: Arthropoda
- Class: Insecta
- Order: Coleoptera
- Suborder: Polyphaga
- Infraorder: Cucujiformia
- Family: Tenebrionidae
- Genus: Eleodes
- Species: E. nigropilosa

Binomial name
- Eleodes nigropilosa (LeConte, 1851)

Synonyms
- Amphidora nigropilosa; Amphidora tenebrosa

= Eleodes nigropilosa =

Species of beetle

Eleodes nigropilosa is a species of desert stink beetle in the family Tenebrionidae. It is found in California and Baja California. Due to its hair, it is similar to Eleodes osculans and Eleodes littoralis.
