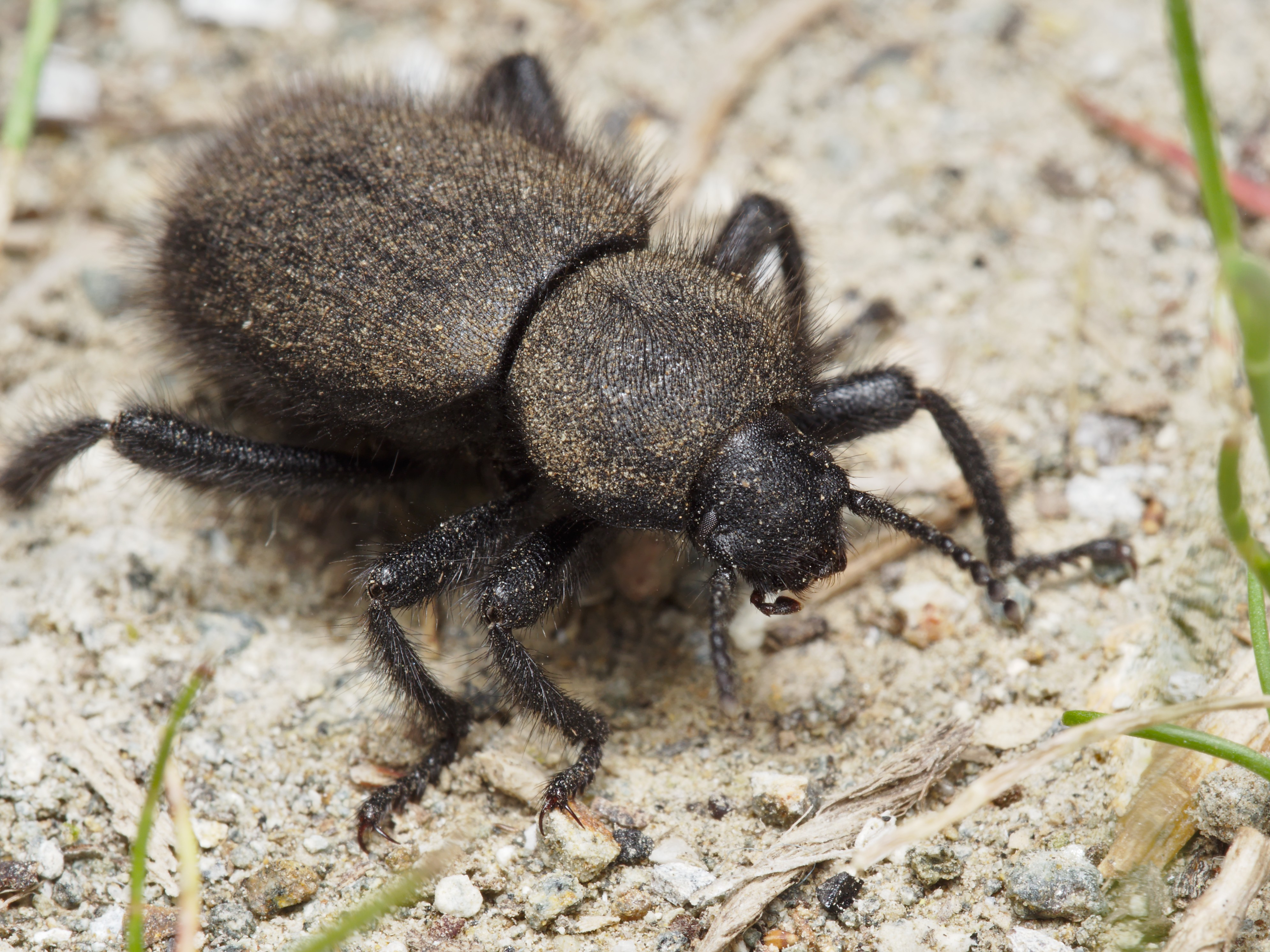

Scientific classification
- Kingdom: Animalia
- Phylum: Arthropoda
- Class: Insecta
- Order: Coleoptera
- Suborder: Polyphaga
- Infraorder: Cucujiformia
- Family: Tenebrionidae
- Genus: Eleodes
- Species: E. osculans

Binomial name
- Eleodes osculans LeConte, 1851

Synonyms
- Amphidora osculans; Cratidus fuscipilosus; Cratidus ovipennis; Eleodes behrii; Eleodes intermedia

= Eleodes osculans =

Wooly darkling beetle

Species of beetle

Eleodes osculans, the wooly darkling beetle or woolly ground beetle, is a common insect in coastal southern and central California in wooded areas or chaparral, and in Baja California. As a stink beetle of genus Eleodes, its easily observed defensive posture is to raise its hind end and secrete an unpleasant odor. E. osculans has a length of 12–16 mm and is the only known darkling beetle species with reddish-brown hair covering most of its black exoskeleton. It is similar to Eleodes nigropilosa and Eleodes littoralis, which have darker hair.
