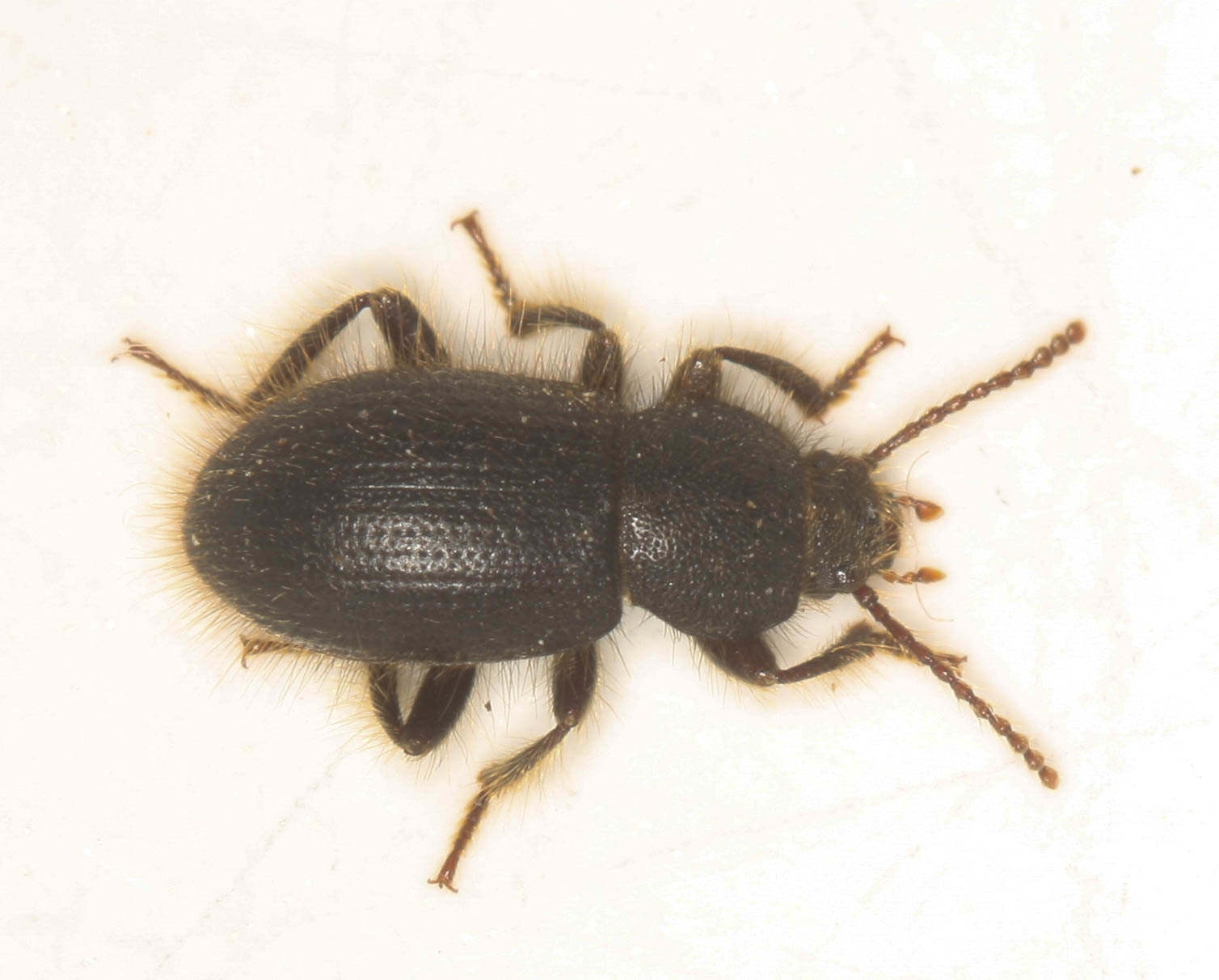

Scientific classification
- Kingdom: Animalia
- Phylum: Arthropoda
- Class: Insecta
- Order: Coleoptera
- Suborder: Polyphaga
- Infraorder: Cucujiformia
- Family: Tenebrionidae
- Genus: Eleodes
- Species: E. littoralis

Binomial name
- Eleodes littoralis (Eschscholtz, 1829)

Synonyms
- Amphidora littoralis

= Eleodes littoralis =

Species of beetle

Eleodes littoralis is a species of desert stink beetle in the family Tenebrionidae. It is found in California. Due to its hair, it is similar to Eleodes osculans and Eleodes nigropilosa.
