= Cervical fascia =

Details

Identifiers
- Latin: fascia cervicalis; fascia colli
- TA98: A04.2.05.001
- TA2: 2206
- FMA: 76866

The cervical fascia is fascia found in the region of the neck.

It usually refers to the deep cervical fascia. However, there is also a superficial cervical fascia.
