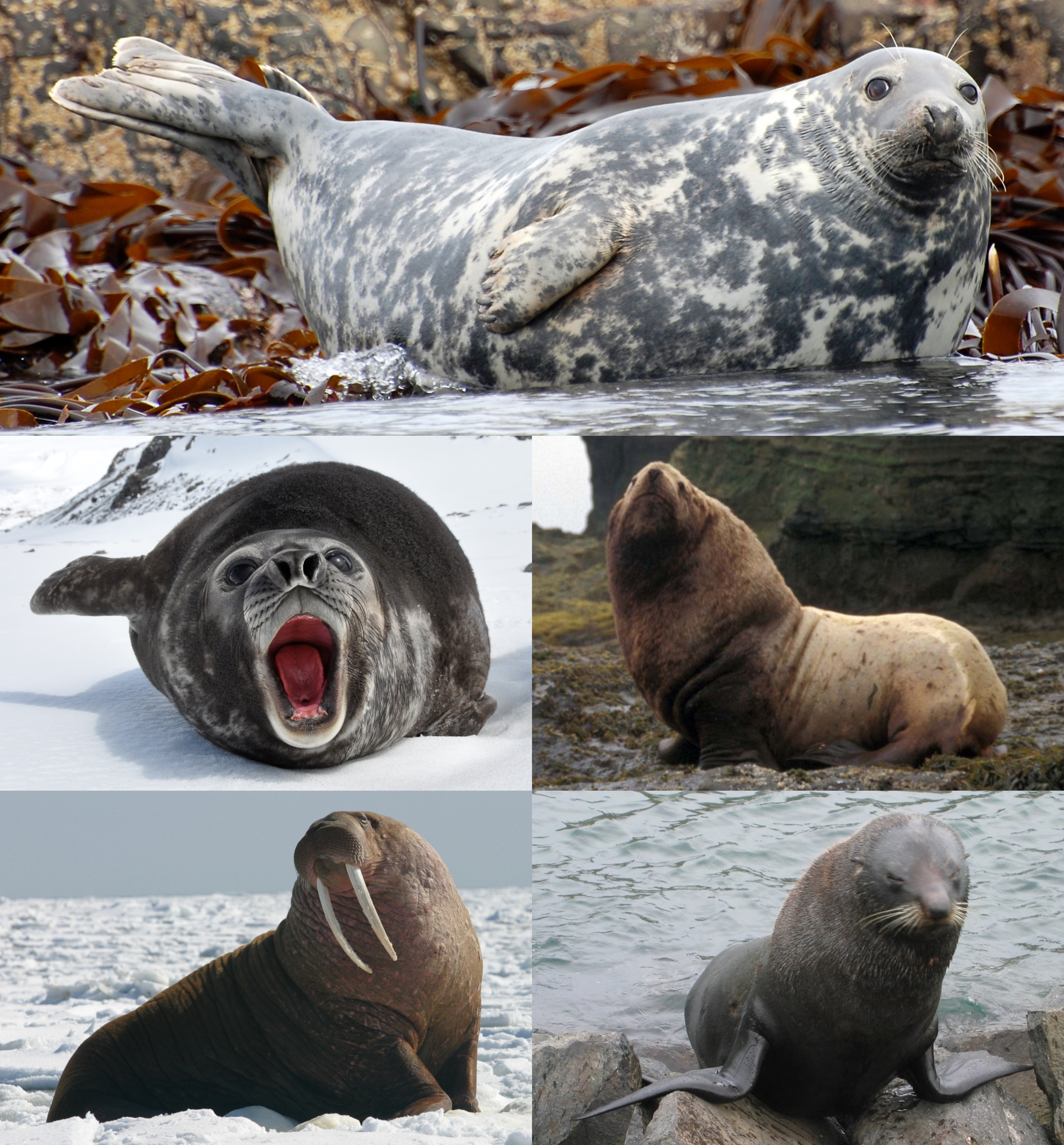
- Clockwise from top: Grey seal (Halichoerus grypus), Steller sea lion (Eumetopias jubatus), New Zealand fur seal (Arctocephalus forsteri), walrus (Odobenus rosmarus), and southern elephant seal (Mirounga leonina)

Scientific classification
- Kingdom: Animalia
- Phylum: Chordata
- Class: Mammalia
- Order: Carnivora
- Clade: Pinnipedimorpha
- Clade: Pinnipediformes
- Parvorder: Pinnipedia; Illiger, 1811

Subclades
- Family †Desmatophocidae; Superfamily Otarioidea; Family Odobenidae (walruses); Family Otariidae (fur seals and sea lions); Superfamily Phocoidea; Family Phocidae (true or earless seals)
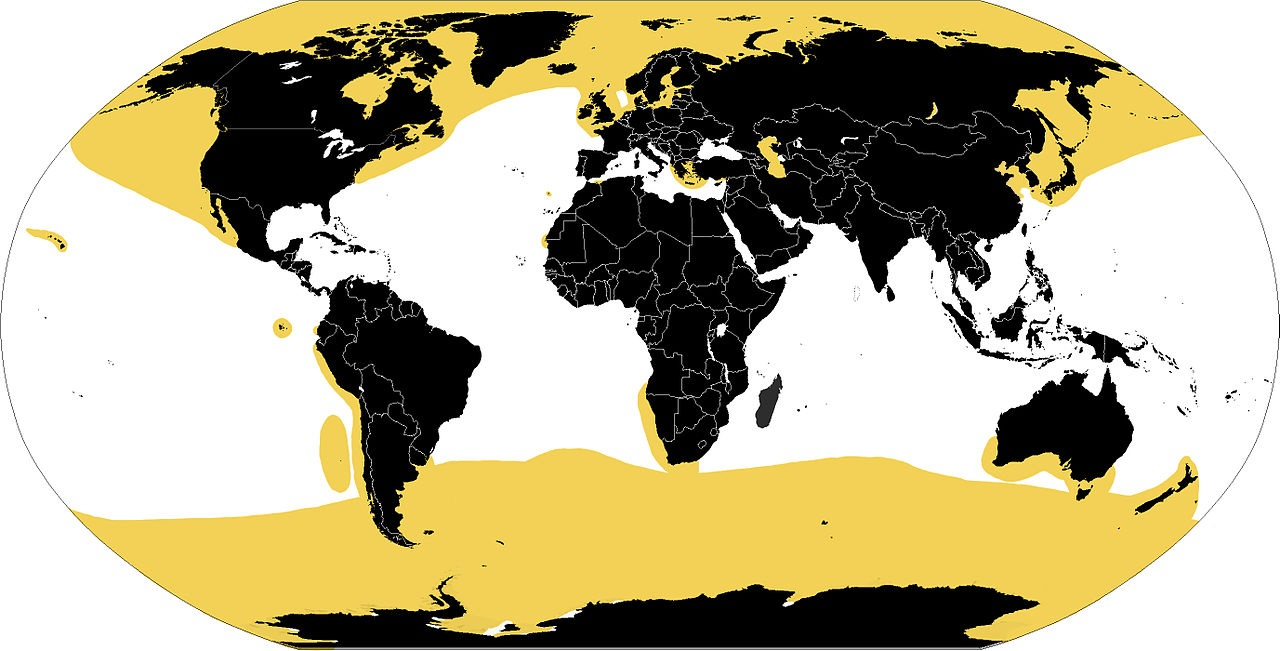
- Range map

= Pinniped =

Pinnipeds Temporal range: Latest Oligocene – Holocene, 24–0 Ma

Taxonomic group of semi-aquatic mammals

Pinnipeds (pronounced /ˈpɪnɪˌpɛdz/), commonly known as seals, (Note: This term typically excludes the walrus in everyday English. In science, it is also sometimes restricted to the "true" seals of the family Phocidae. This article uses it for all pinnipeds.) are widely distributed and diverse carnivorous, fin-footed, semiaquatic, mostly marine mammals, belonging to the clade Pinnipedia. They comprise the extant families Odobenidae (whose only living member is the walrus), Otariidae (the eared seals: sea lions and fur seals), and Phocidae (the earless seals, or true seals), with 34 extant species and more than 50 extinct species described from fossils. While seals were historically thought to have descended from two ancestral lines, molecular evidence supports them as a monophyletic group (descended from one ancestor). Pinnipeds belong to the suborder Caniformia of the order Carnivora; their closest living relatives are musteloids (weasels, raccoons, skunks and red pandas), having diverged about 50 million years ago.

Seals range in size from the 1 m (3 ft 3 in) and 45 kg (100 lb) Baikal seal to the 5 m (16 ft) and 3,200 kg (7,100 lb) southern elephant seal. Several species exhibit sexual dimorphism. They have streamlined bodies and four limbs that are modified into flippers. Though not as fast in the water as dolphins, seals are more flexible and agile. Otariids primarily use their front limbs to propel themselves through the water, while phocids and walruses primarily use their hind limbs for this purpose. Otariids and walruses have hind limbs that can be pulled under the body and used as legs on land. By comparison, terrestrial locomotion by phocids is more cumbersome. Otariids have visible external ears, while phocids and walruses lack these. Pinnipeds have well-developed senses—their eyesight and hearing are adapted for both air and water, and they have an advanced tactile system in their whiskers or vibrissae. Some species are well adapted for diving to great depths. They have a layer of fat, or blubber, under the skin to keep warm in cold water, and, other than the walrus, all species are covered in fur.

Although pinnipeds are widespread, most species prefer the colder waters of the Northern and Southern Hemispheres. They spend most of their lives in water, but come ashore to mate, give birth, molt or to avoid ocean predators, such as sharks and orcas. Seals mainly live in marine environments but can also be found in fresh water. They feed largely on fish and marine invertebrates; a few, such as the leopard seal, feed on large vertebrates, such as penguins and other seals. Walruses are specialized for feeding on bottom-dwelling mollusks. Male pinnipeds typically mate with more than one female (polygyny), though the degree of polygyny varies with the species. The males of land-breeding species tend to mate with a greater number of females than those of ice breeding species. Male pinniped strategies for reproductive success vary between defending females, defending territories that attract females and performing ritual displays or lek mating. Pups are typically born in the spring and summer months and females bear almost all the responsibility for raising them. Mothers of some species fast and nurse their young for a relatively short period of time while others take foraging trips at sea between nursing bouts. Walruses are known to nurse their young while at sea. Seals produce a number of vocalizations, notably the barks of California sea lions, the gong-like calls of walruses and the complex songs of Weddell seals.

The meat, blubber and skin of pinnipeds have traditionally been used by indigenous peoples of the Arctic. Seals have been depicted in various cultures worldwide. They are commonly kept in captivity and are even sometimes trained to perform tricks and tasks. Once relentlessly hunted by commercial industries for their products, seals are now protected by international law. The Japanese sea lion and the Caribbean monk seal have become extinct in the past century, while the Mediterranean monk seal and Hawaiian monk seal are ranked as endangered by the International Union for Conservation of Nature. Besides hunting, pinnipeds also face threats from accidental trapping, marine pollution, climate change and conflicts with local people.

== Etymology ==
The name "pinniped" derives from the Latin words pinna 'fin' and pes, pedis 'foot'. The common name "seal" originates from the Old English word seolh, which is in turn derived from the Proto-Germanic *selkhaz.

== Taxonomy ==
- Pinnipedia
  - Otarioidea
    - Odobenidae
      Walrus
    - Otariidae (eared seals)
      - Northern fur seal
      - - - Steller sea lion
          - - Galápagos sea lion
            - California sea lion
        - - South American sea lion
          - - - New Zealand sea lion
              - Australian sea lion
            - - - Subantarctic fur seal
                - Cape fur seal
              - - - Guadalupe fur seal
                  - Juan Fernández fur seal
                - - Antarctic fur seal
                  - - New Zealand fur seal
                    - - Galápagos fur seal
                      - South American fur seal
  - Phocidae (earless seals)
    - Phocinae
      - Bearded seal
      - - Hooded seal
        - - - - Harp seal
              - Ribbon seal
            - - - Harbor seal
                - Spotted seal
              - - Grey seal
                - - Baikal seal
                  - - Ringed seal
                    - Caspian seal
    - Monachinae
      - - Miroungini (elephant seals)
          - Southern elephant seal
          - Northern elephant seal
        - Lobodontini
          - - Ross seal
            - Crabeater seal
          - - Weddell seal
            - Leopard seal
      - Monachini (monk seals)
        - Hawaiian monk seal
        - Mediterranean monk seal

Cladogram of extant pinnipeds based on molecular evidence by Park et al., 2024.

The German naturalist Johann Karl Wilhelm Illiger was the first to recognize the pinnipeds as a distinct taxonomic unit; in 1811 he gave the name Pinnipedia to both a family and an order. American zoologist Joel Asaph Allen reviewed the world's pinnipeds in an 1880 monograph, History of North American pinnipeds, a monograph of the walruses, sea-lions, sea-bears and seals of North America. In this publication, he traced the history of names, gave keys to families and genera, described North American species and provided synopses of species in other parts of the world. In 1989, Annalisa Berta and colleagues proposed the unranked clade Pinnipedimorpha to contain the fossil genus Enaliarctos and modern seals as a sister group. Of the three extant families, the Otariidae and Odobenidae are grouped in the superfamily Otarioidea, while the Phocidae belong to the superfamily Phocoidea. There are 34 extant species of pinnipeds, and more than 50 fossil species of pinnipedimorphs.

Otariids are also known as eared seals due to their pinnae. These animals swim mainly using their well-developed fore-flippers. They can also "walk" on land by shifting their hind-flippers forward under the body. The front end of an otariid's frontal bone protrudes between the nasal bones, with a large and flattened supraorbital foramen. An extra spine splits the supraspinatous fossa and bronchi that are divided in the front. Otariids consist of two types: sea lions and fur seals; the latter typically being smaller, with pointier snouts, longer fore-flippers and heavier fur coats. Five genera and seven species (one now extinct) of sea lion are known to exist, while two genera and nine species of fur seal exist. While sea lions and fur seals have historically been considered separate subfamilies (Otariinae and Arctocephalinae respectively), genetic and molecular evidence has refuted this, indicating that the northern fur seal is basal to other otariids and the Australian sea lion and New Zealand sea lion are more closely related to Arctocephalus than to other sea lions.

Odobenidae has only one living member: the walrus. This animal is noticeable from its larger size (exceeded only by the elephant seals), nearly hairless skin, flattened snout and long upper canines, known as tusks. Like otariids, walruses can walk on land with their hind limbs. When moving in water, the walrus relies on its hind limbs for locomotion, while its forelimbs are used for steering. Also, it has no outer ears. The epipterygoid of the jaw is well developed and the back of the nasal bones are horizontal. In the feet, the calcaneuses protrude in the middle.

Phocids are known as true or "earless" seals. These animals lack visible outer ears. This means they lack external ear pinnae. Compared to eared seals, phocids mastoid bone is very flat. Phocids cannot position their hind-flippers underneath their body, which means Phocids cannot use their hind-flippers to lift up their body. When they move on land (or ice), it looks like they are "galumphing". This is because of their massive ankle bones and flatter heels. In water, true seals rely on the side-to-side motion of their hind-flippers and lower body to move forward. The phocid's skull has thickened mastoids, puffed up entotympanic bones, nasal bones with a pointed tip in the back and a non-existent supraorbital foramen. The hip has a more converse ilium. A 2006 molecular study supports the division of phocids into two monophyletic subfamilies: Monachinae, which consists of elephant seals, monk seals and Antarctic seals; and Phocinae, which consists of the northern seals. This subfamily includes the hooded seals and the bearded seals.

=== Evolution ===
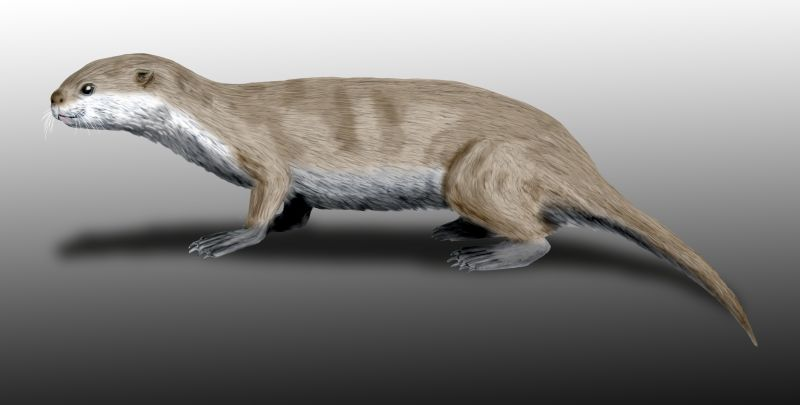
Restoration of Puijila

Pinnipeds belong to the order Carnivora and the suborder Caniformia (known as dog-like carnivorans). One popular hypothesis suggested that pinnipeds are diphyletic (descended from two ancestral lines), with walruses and otariids sharing a recent common ancestor with bears; and phocids sharing one with Musteloidea. However, morphological and molecular evidence support a monophyletic origin. A 2021 genetic study found that pinnipeds are more closely related to musteloids. Pinnipeds split from other caniforms 50 million years ago (mya) during the Eocene. The earliest fossils of pinnipeds date back to the Late Oligocene. Fossil animals representing basal lineages include Puijila, of the Early Miocene in Arctic Canada. It resembled a modern otter, but shows evidence of quadrupedal swimming—retaining a form of aquatic locomotion that led to those employed by modern pinnipeds. Potamotherium, which lived in the same period in Europe, was similar to Puijila but more aquatic. The braincase of Potamotherium shows evidence that it used its whiskers to hunt, like modern seals. Both Puijila and Potamotherium fossils have been found in lake deposits, suggesting that seal ancestors were originally adapted for fresh water.

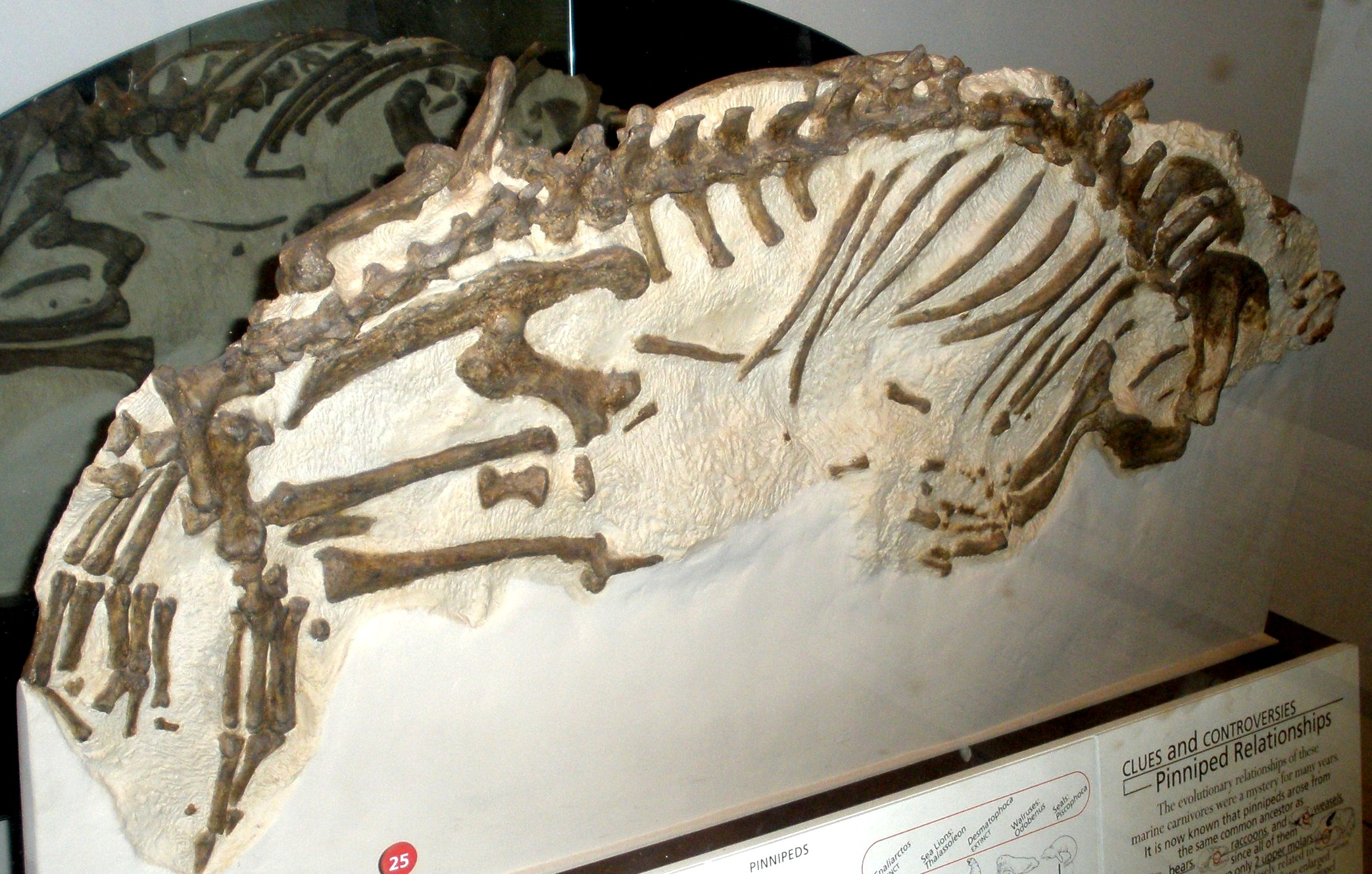
Fossil of Enaliarctos

Enaliarctos, a fossil species of late Oligocene/early Miocene (24–22 mya) California, closely resembled modern pinnipeds; it was adapted to an aquatic life with flippers and a flexible spine. Its teeth were more like land predators in that they were more adapted for shearing. Its hind-flippers may have allowed it to walk on land, and it probably did not leave coastal areas as much as its modern relatives. Enaliarctos was likely more of a fore-flipper swimmer, but could probably swim with either pair. One species, Enaliarctos emlongi, exhibited notable sexual dimorphism, suggesting that this physical characteristic may have been an important driver of pinniped evolution. A closer relative of extant pinnipeds was Pteronarctos, which lived in Oregon 19–15 mya. As in modern seals, the maxilla or upper jaw bone of Pteroarctos intersects with the orbital wall. The extinct family Desmatophocidae lived 23–10 mya in the North Pacific. They had long skulls that with large orbits, interlocked zygomatic bones and rounded molars and premolars. They also were sexually dimorphic and may have been capable of swimming with both or either pair of flippers. They are grouped with modern pinnipeds, but there is debate as to whether they are more closely related to phocids or to otariids and walruses. A 2024 study places them within Phocidae, specifically Phocinae.

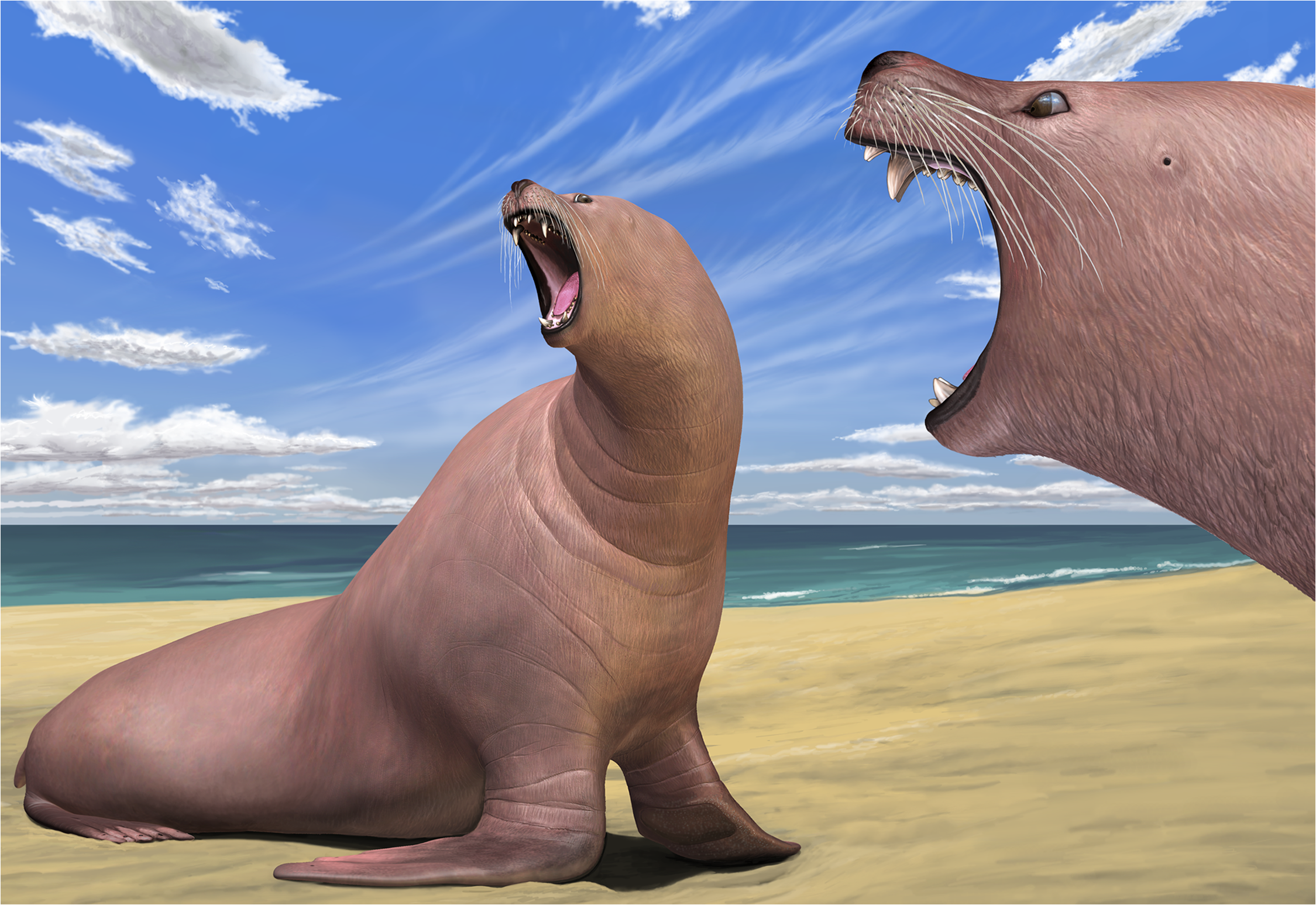
Reconstruction of Archaeodobenus akamatsui family Odobenidae

The ancestors of the Otarioidea and Phocoidea diverged around 25 mya. Phocids are known to have existed for at least 15 million years, and molecular evidence supports a divergence of the Monachinae and Phocinae lineages around this time. The fossil genera Monotherium and Leptophoca of southeastern North America represent the earliest members of Monachinae and Phocinae respectively. Both lineages may have originated in the North Atlantic, and likely reached the Pacific via the Central American Seaway. Phocines mainly stayed in the Northern Hemisphere, while the monachines diversified southward. The lineages of Otariidae and Odobenidae split around 20 mya. The earliest fossil records of otariids are in North Pacific and dated to around 11 mya. Early fossil genera include Pithanotaria and Thalassoleon. The Callorhinus lineage split the earliest, followed by the Eumetopias/Zalophus lineage and then the rest, which colonized the Southern Hemisphere. The earliest fossils of Odobenidae—Prototaria of Japan and Proneotherium of Oregon—date to 18–16 mya. These primitive walruses had normal sized canines and fed on fish instead of mollusks. Later taxa like Gomphotaria, Pontolis and Dusignathus had longer canines on both the upper and lower jaw. The familiar long upper tusks developed in the genera Valenictus and Odobenus. The lineage of the modern walrus may have spread from the North Pacific to the North Atlantic through the Caribbean and Central American Seaway 8–5 mya, and then back to the North Pacific via the Arctic 1 mya, or to the Arctic and subsequently the North Atlantic during the Pleistocene.

== Anatomy and physiology ==
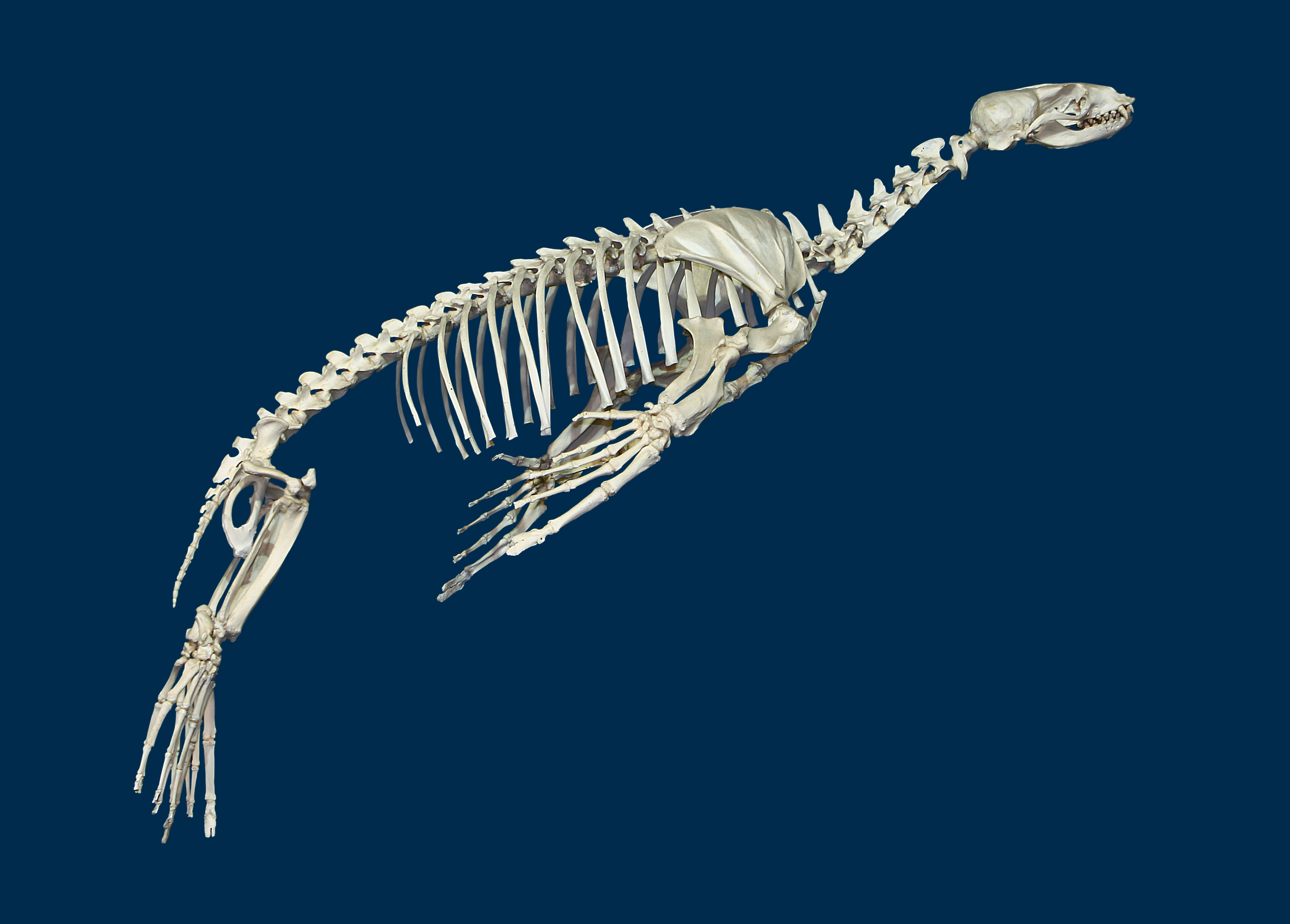

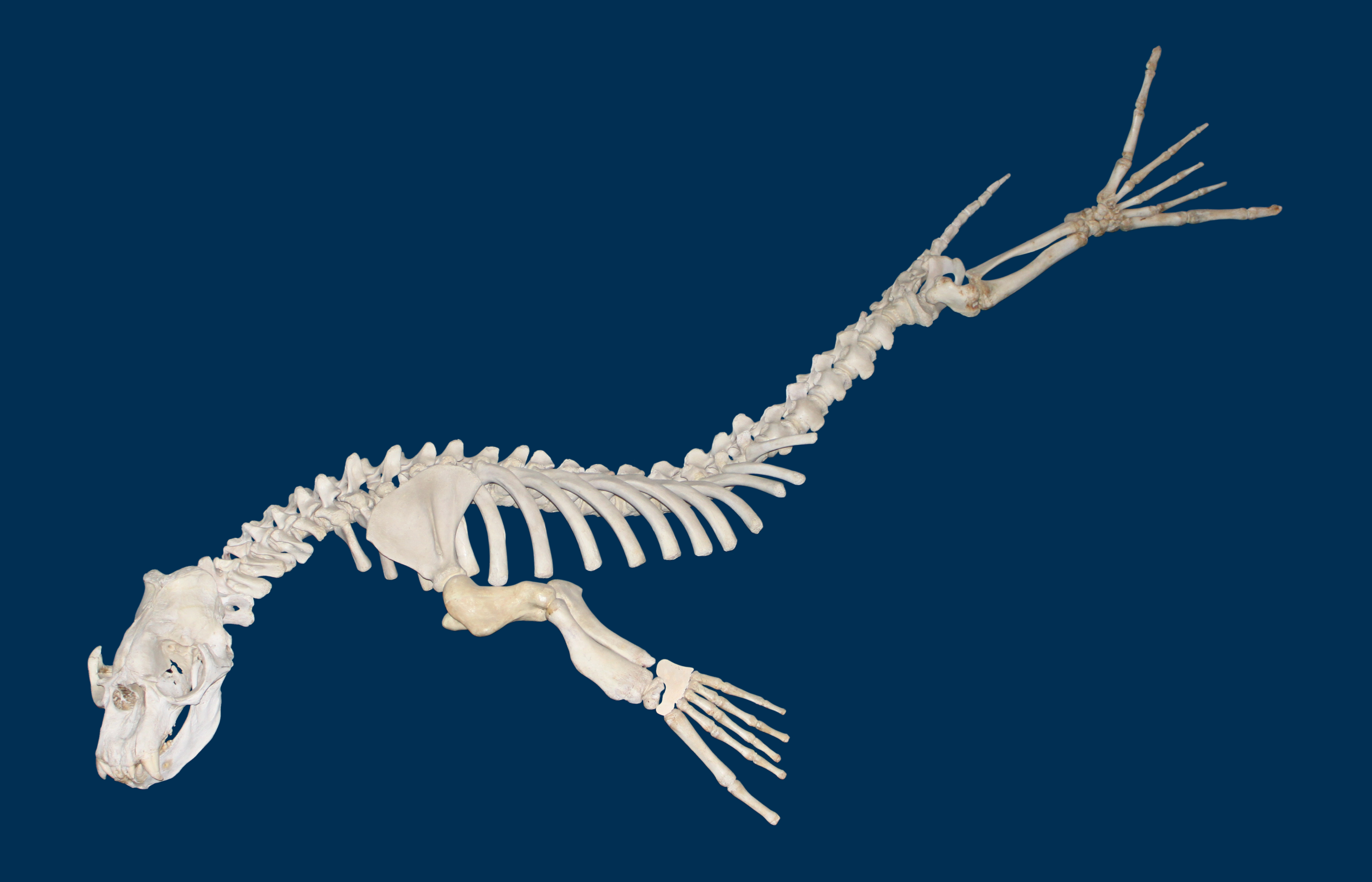
Skeleton of California sea lion (top) and southern elephant seal

Pinnipeds have streamlined, spindle-shaped bodies with small or non-existent ear flaps, rounded heads, short muzzles, flexible necks, limbs modified into flippers and small tails. The mammary glands and genitals can withdraw into the body. Seals are unique among carnivorans in that their orbital walls are mostly shaped by the maxilla and are not contained by certain facial bones. Compared to land carnivores, pinnipeds have fewer teeth, which are pointed and cone-shaped. They are adapted for holding onto slippery prey rather than shearing meat like the carnassials of other carnivorans. The walrus has unique tusks which are long upper canines.

Pinnipeds range in size from the 1 m (3 ft 3 in) and 45 kg (100 lb) Baikal seal to the 5 m (16 ft) and 3,200 kg (7,100 lb) southern elephant seal. Overall, they tend to be larger than other carnivores. Several species have male-biased sexual dimorphism that depends on how polygynous a species is: highly polygynous species like elephant seals are extremely sexually dimorphic, while less polygynous species have males and females that are closer in size, or, in the case of Antarctic seals, females are moderately bigger. Males of sexually dimorphic species also tend to have secondary sex characteristics, such as larger or more prominent heads, necks, chests, crests, noses/proboscises and canine teeth as well as thicker fur and manes. Though more polygynous species tend to be sexually dimorphic, some evidence suggests that size differences between the sexes originated due to ecological differences, with polygyny developing later.

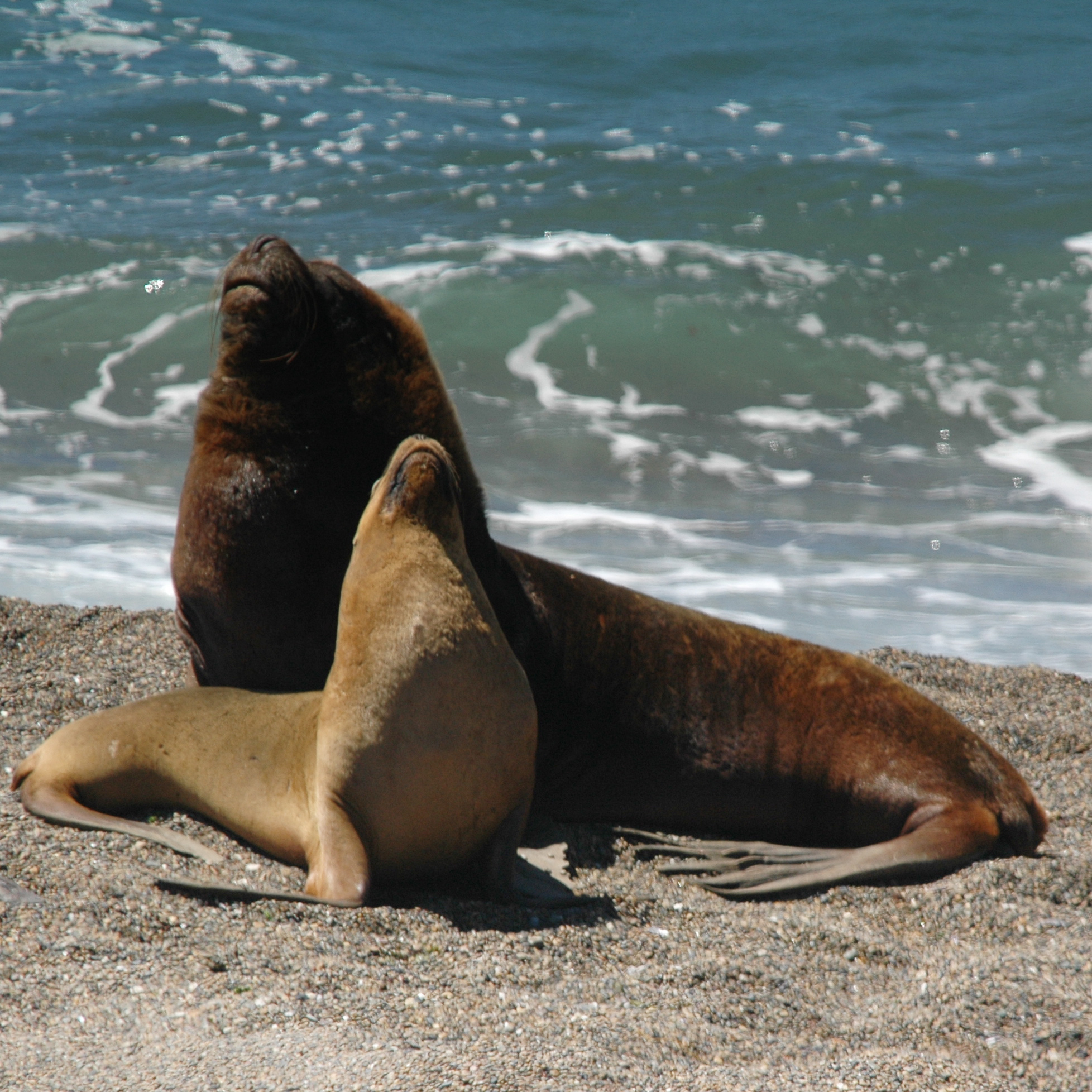
Male and female South American sea lions, showing sexual dimorphism

Almost all pinnipeds have fur coats, the exception being the walrus, which is only sparsely covered. Even some fully furred species (particularly sea lions) are less furry than land mammals. Fur seals have lush coats consisting of an undercoat and guard hairs. In species that live on ice, young pups have thicker coats than adults. The individual hairs on the coat, known collectively as lanugo, can trap heat from sunlight and keep the pup warm. Pinnipeds are typically countershaded, and are darker colored dorsally and lighter colored ventrally, which serves to counter the effects of self-shadowing caused by light shining over the ocean water. The pure white fur of harp seal pups conceals them in their Arctic environment. Several species have clashing patterns of light and dark pigmentation. All fully furred species molt; the process of which may be quick or gradual depending on the species. Seals have a layer of subcutaneous fat, known as blubber, that is particularly thick in phocids and walruses. Blubber serves both to keep the animals warm and to provide energy and nourishment when they are fasting. It can constitute as much as 50% of a pinniped's mass. Newborn pups have a thin layer of blubber, but some species compensate for this with thick lanugos.

The simple stomach of pinnipeds is typical of carnivores. Most species have neither a cecum nor a clear demarcation between the small and large intestines; the large intestine is comparatively short and only slightly wider than the small intestine. Small intestine lengths range from 8 times (California sea lion) to 25 times (elephant seal) the body length. The length of the intestine may be an adaptation to frequent deep diving, allowing for more room in the digestive tract for partially digested food. An appendix is absent in seals. As in most marine mammals, the kidneys are divided into lobes and filter out excess salt.

=== Locomotion ===
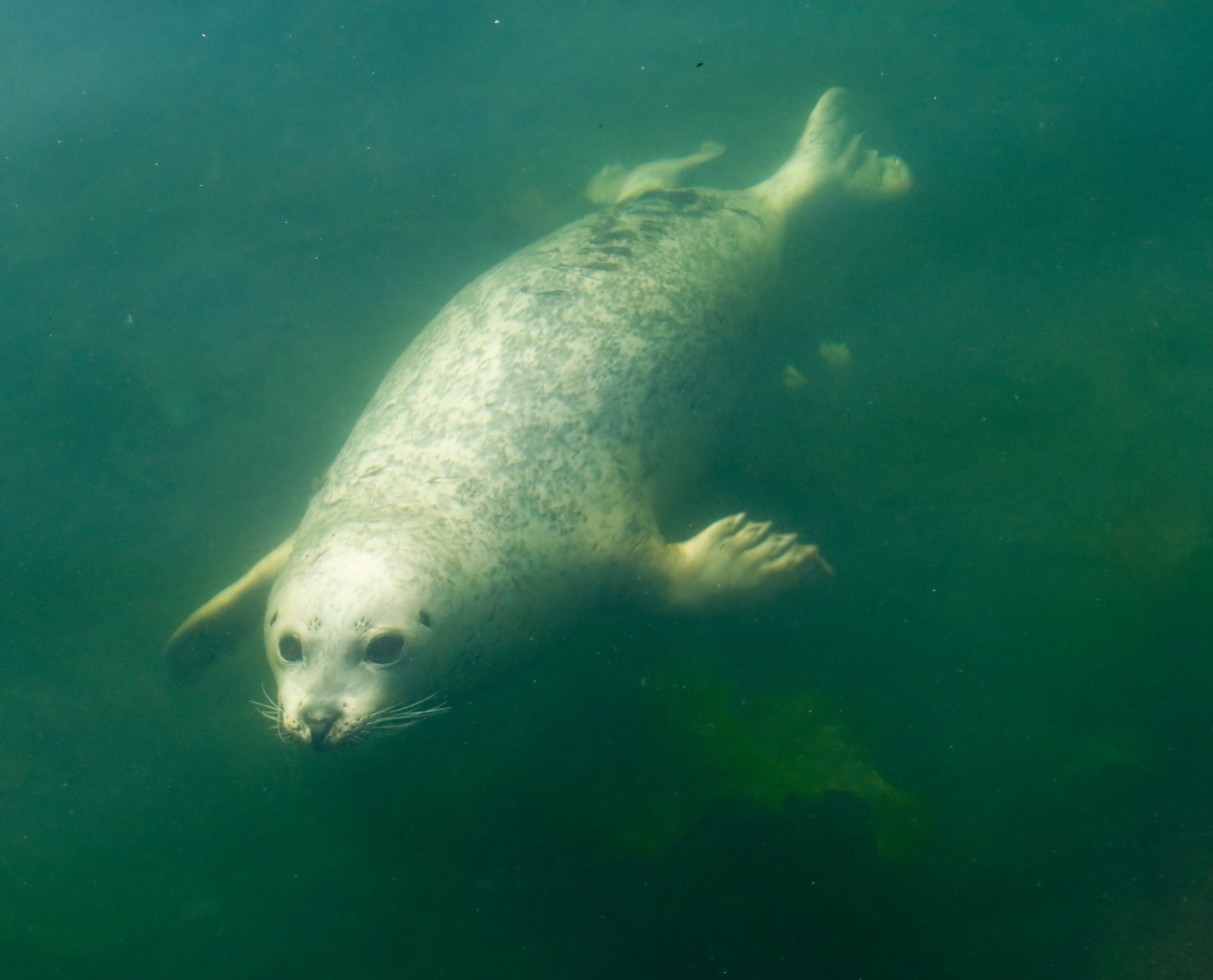

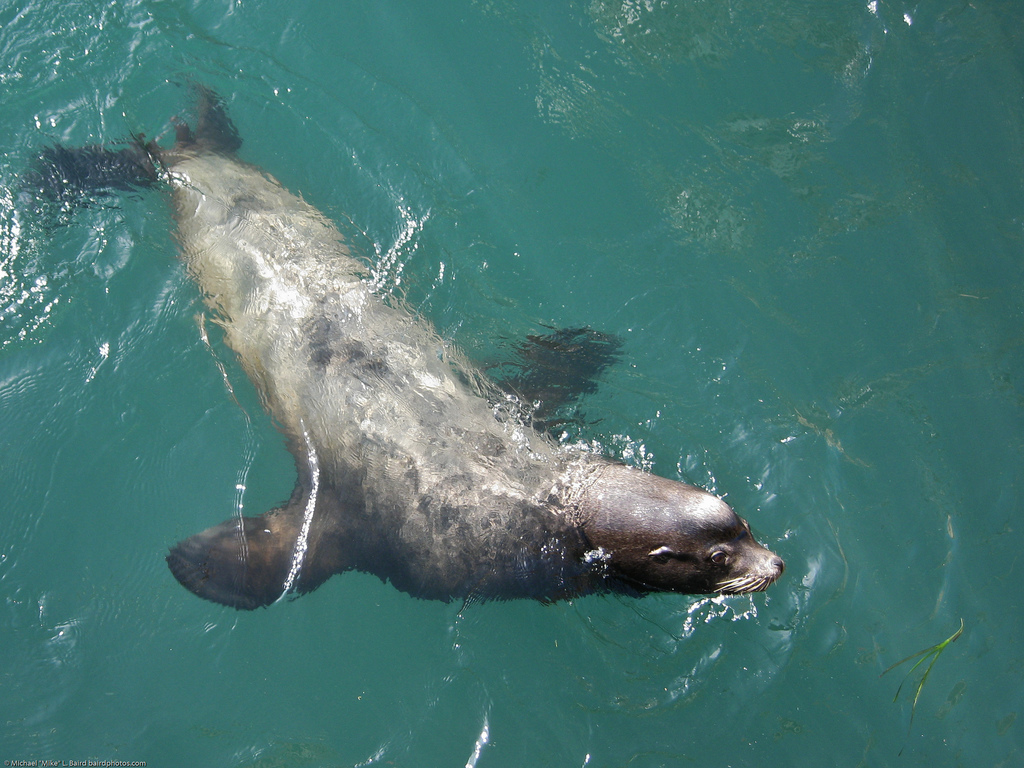
Harbor seal (top) and California sea lion swimming. The former swims with its hind-flippers, the latter with its fore-flippers.

Pinnipeds have two pairs of flippers on the front and back, the fore-flippers and hind-flippers. Their elbows and ankles are not externally visible. Pinnipeds are not as fast as cetaceans, typically swimming at 5–15 kn (9–28 km/h; 6–17 mph) compared to around 20 kn (37 km/h; 23 mph) for several species of dolphin. Seals are more agile and flexible, and some otariids, such as the California sea lion, can make dorsal turns as the back of their heads can touch their hind flippers. Pinnipeds have several adaptions for reducing drag. In addition to their streamlined bodies, they have smooth networks of muscle bundles in their skin that may increase laminar flow and cut through the water. The hair erector muscles are absent, so their fur can be streamlined as they swim.

When swimming, otariids rely on their fore-flippers for locomotion in a wing-like manner similar to penguins and sea turtles. Fore-flipper movement is not continuous, and the animal glides between each stroke. Compared to terrestrial carnivorans, the fore-limb bones of otariids are reduced in length, giving them less resistance at the elbow joint as the flippers flap; the hind-flippers maneuver them. Phocids and walruses swim by moving their hind-flippers and lower body from side to side, while their fore-flippers are mainly used for maneuvering. Some species leap out of the water, and "ride" waves.

Pinnipeds can move around on land, though not as well as terrestrial animals. Otariids and walruses are capable of turning their hind-flippers forward and under the body so they can "walk" on all fours. The fore-flippers move along a transverse plane, rather than the sagittal plane like the limbs of land mammals. Otariids create momentum by laterally swaying their heads and necks. Sea lions have been recorded climbing up flights of stairs. Phocids lack the ability to walk on their hind-flippers, and must flop and wriggle their bodies forward as their fore-flippers keep them stable. In some species, the fore-flippers may act like oars pushing against the ground. Phocids can move faster on ice, as they are able to slide.

=== Senses ===
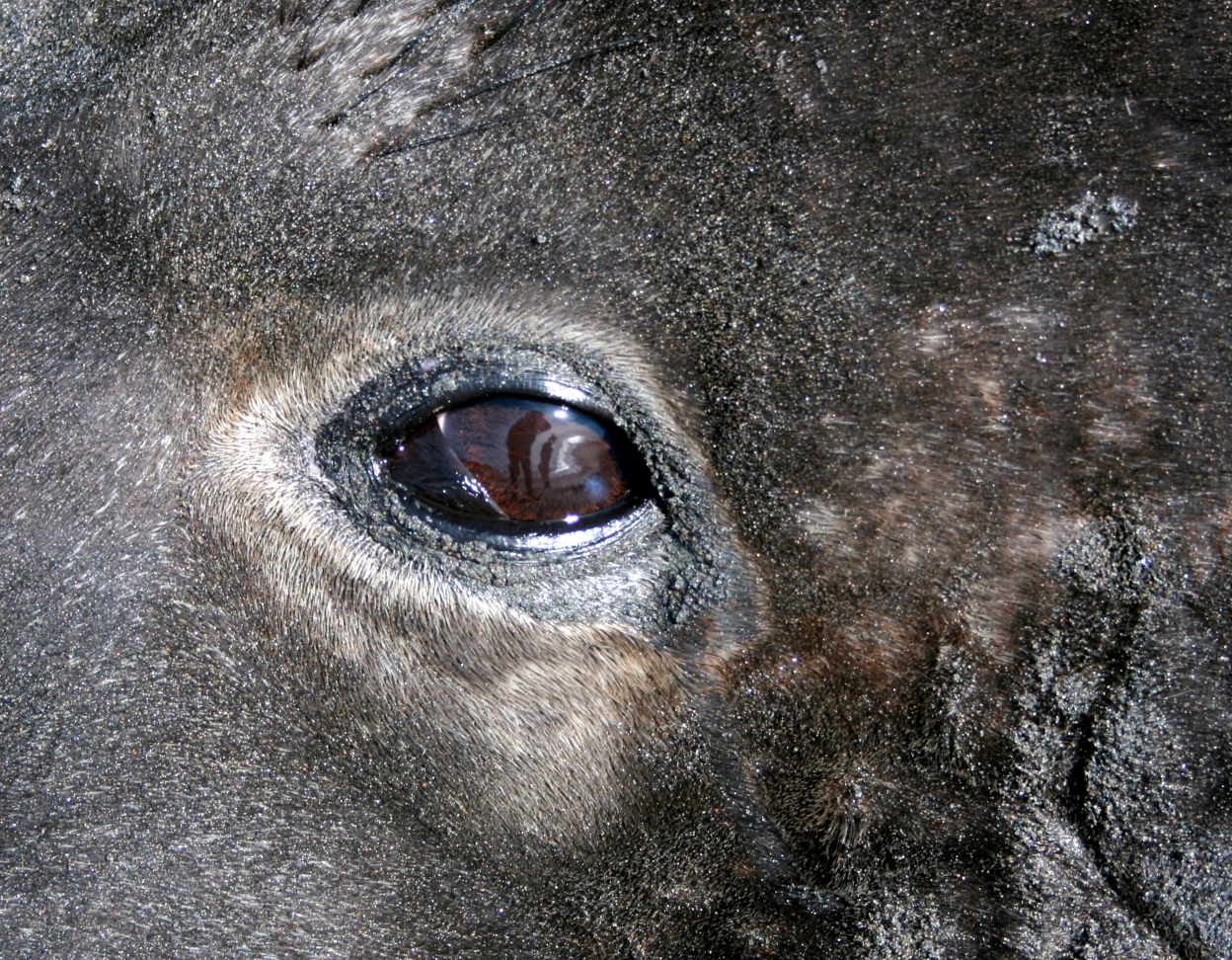
Light reflection on an elephant seal eye

The eyes of pinnipeds are relatively large for their size and are positioned near the front of the head. Only the smaller eyes of the walruses are located on each side of the head; since they forage at the bottom for sedentary mollusks. A seal's eye is suited for seeing both underwater and in air. Most of the retina is equidistant around the spherical lens. The cornea has a flattened center where refraction does not change between air and water. The vascular iris has a strong dilator muscle. A contracted pupil is typically pear-shaped, although the bearded seal's is more horizontal. Compared to deep-diving elephant seals, the iris of shallower species, such as harbor seals and California sea lions, does not change much in size between constriction and dilation. Seals are able to see in relative darkness with a tapetum lucidum, a reflecting layer that increases sensitivity by reflecting light back through the rods.

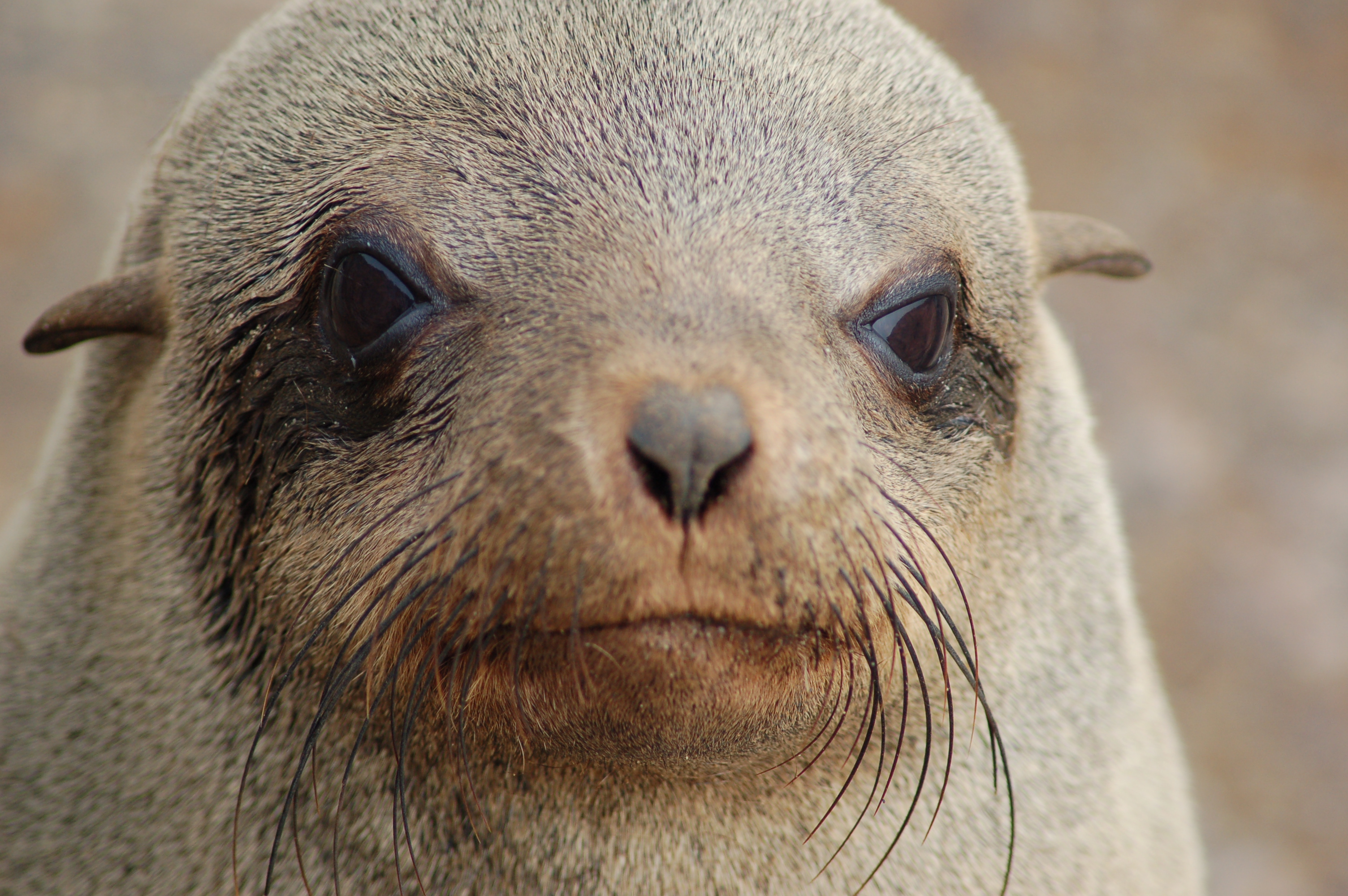
Frontal view of Cape fur seal head

On land, pinnipeds are near-sighted in dim light. This is reduced in bright light as the contracted pupil decreases the ability of the lens and the cornea to refract (bend) light. Polar living seals like the harp seal have corneas that can withstand the bright light that reflects off snow and ice, which would otherwise cause snow blindness. Color vision requires at least two types of visual pigments with different spectral sensitivities but since pinnipeds lack short-wavelength-sensitive cone cells, they are generally considered to be color-blind. Flexible eye movement has been documented in seals. The walrus can project its eyes out from its sockets in both a forward and upward direction due to its advanced extraocular muscles and absence of an orbital roof. The seal eye is durable as the corneal epithelium is hardened by keratin, and the sclera is thick enough to withstand the pressures of diving. Seals also secrete mucus from the lacrimal gland to protect their eyes. As in many mammals and birds, pinnipeds possess nictitating membranes.

The pinniped ear is adapted for hearing underwater, where it can hear sound frequencies of up to 70,000 Hz. In air, hearing is somewhat reduced in pinnipeds compared to many terrestrial mammals. While their airborne hearing sensitivity is generally weaker than humans', they still have a wide frequency range. One study of three species—the harbor seal, California sea lion and northern elephant seal—found that the sea lion was best adapted for airborne hearing, the elephant seal for underwater hearing and the harbor seal was equally adapted for both. Although pinnipeds have a fairly good sense of smell on land, it is useless under water as their nostrils are closed.

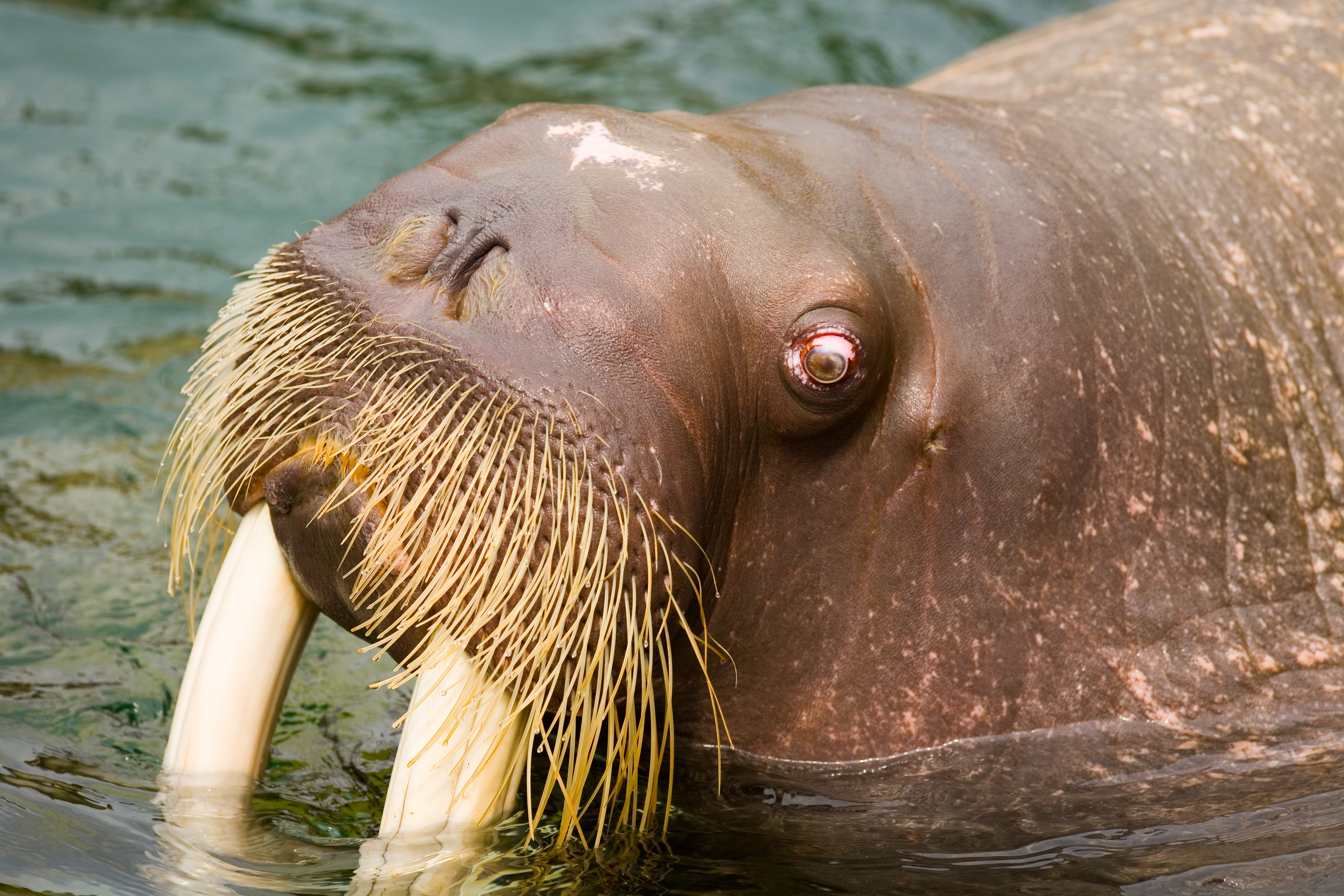
Vibrissae of walrus

The whiskers (vibrissae) are normally smooth in otariids and walruses, while those of most phocids are wavey. The whiskers of some otariids grow quite long—those of the Antarctic fur seal can reach 41 cm (16 in)– while walruses have the most vibrissae, at 600–700 individual hairs. Compared to terrestrial mammals, the vibrissae of pinnipeds have ten times more nerve connections, allowing them to effectively detect vibrations in the water. These vibrations are generated, for example, when a fish swims through water. Detecting vibrations is useful when the animals are foraging, and may add to or even replace vision, particularly in darkness.

Harbor seals can follow hydrodynamic paths made minutes earlier, similar to a dog following a scent trail, and can even discriminate the size and type of object responsible for the trail. Unlike terrestrial mammals, such as rodents, pinnipeds do not sweep their whiskers over an object when examining it, but can protract the hairs forward while holding them steady, maximizing their detection. The vibrissa's angle relative to the flow seems to be the most important contributor to detection ability. Whiskers may also play a role in navigation; spotted seals appear to use them to detect breathing holes in the ice.

=== Diving adaptations ===
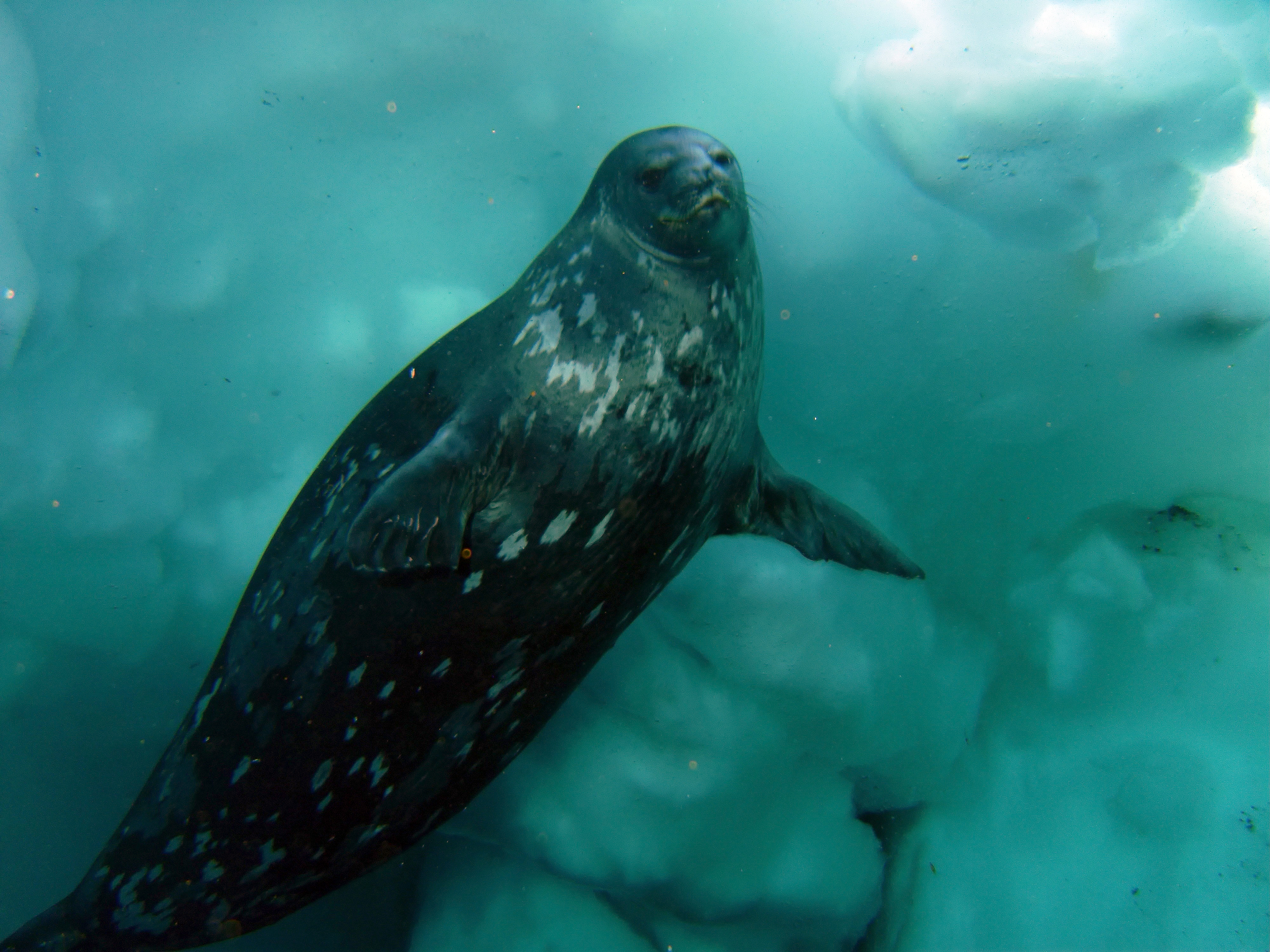
Weddell seal underwater

To dive, a pinniped must first exhale much of the air out of its lungs and shut its nostrils and throat cartilages to protect the trachea. The airways are supported by cartilaginous rings and smooth muscle, and the chest muscles and alveoli can completely deflate during deeper dives. While land mammals generally cannot empty their lungs, pinnipeds can reinflate their lungs even after alveolar collapse. The middle ear contains sinuses that probably fill with blood during dives, preventing middle ear squeeze. The heart of a seal is moderately flattened to allow the lungs to deflate. The trachea is flexible enough to collapse under pressure. During deep dives, any remaining air in their lungs is shifted to the bronchioles and trachea, which stops gas exchange with the blood, and thereby prevents them from developing decompression sickness, oxygen toxicity and nitrogen narcosis. In addition, seals can tolerate large amounts of lactic acid, which reduces skeletal muscle fatigue during intense physical activity.

The circulatory system of pinnipeds is large and elaborate; retia mirabilia line the inside of the trunk and limbs, allowing for greater oxygen storage during diving. As with other diving mammals, pinnipeds have large amounts of hemoglobin and myoglobin stored in their blood and muscles respectively. This provides enough oxygen storage for them to stay submerged for long periods. Deep-diving species such as elephant seals have blood volumes that represent up to 20% of their body weight. When diving, they reduce their heart rate, and blood flow is mostly restricted to the heart, brain and lungs. Pinnipeds have bulb-shaped ascending aortas which are largest in deeper and longer diving species, allowing them to better maintain their blood pressure.

=== Thermoregulation ===
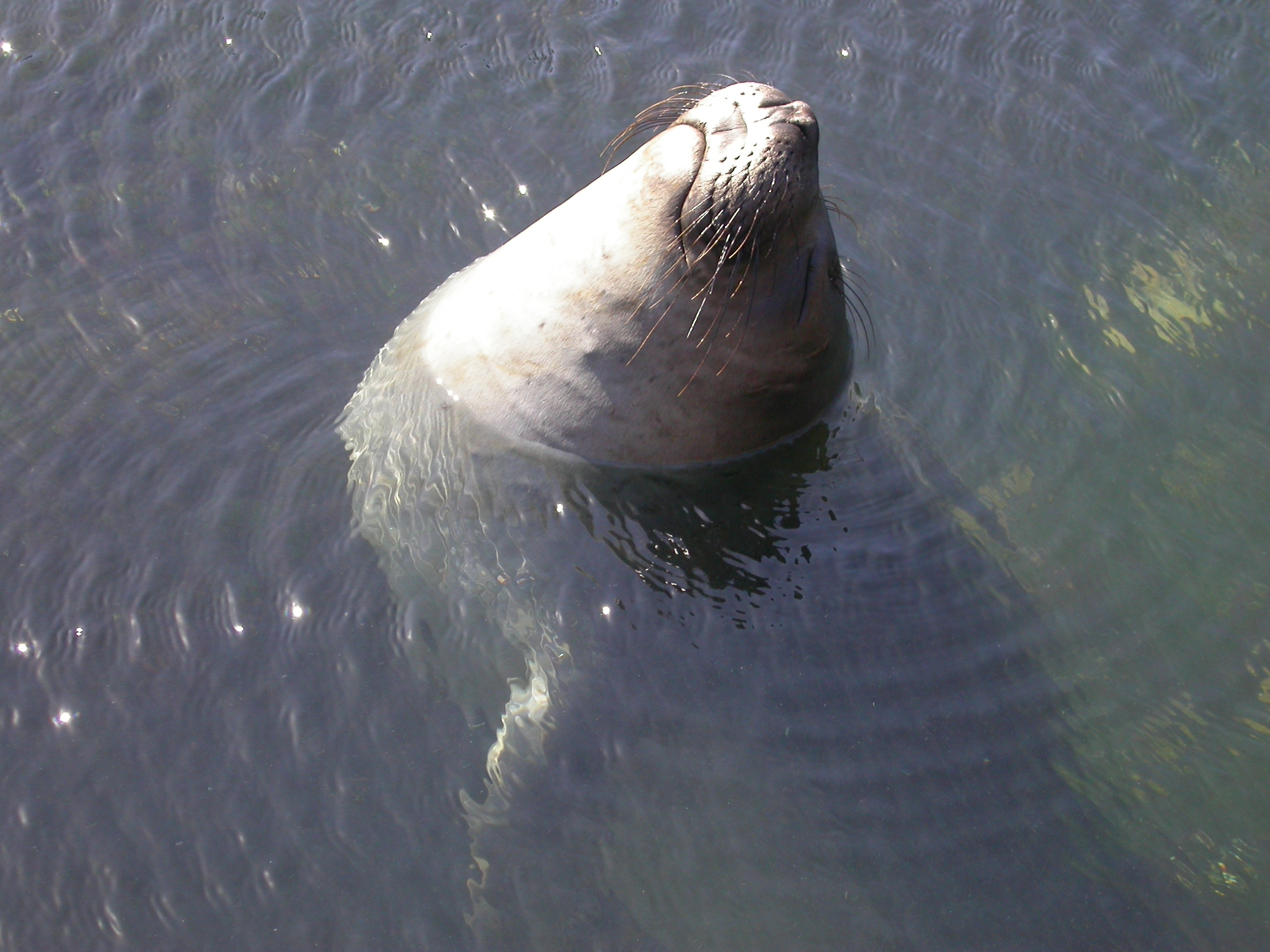
Northern elephant seal resting in water

Pinnipeds keep warm by having large, thick bodies, insulating blubber and fur, and fast metabolism. Their idle body temperature is around 38 °C (100 °F) against the 0–5 °C (32–41 °F) ocean water. Metabolic rates of different species vary between 1.5 and 3 times that of land mammals. Also, the blood vessels in their flippers are adapted for countercurrent exchange; small veins surround arteries transporting blood from the body core, capturing heat from them. While blubber and fur keep the seal warm in water, they can also overheat the animal when it is on land. To counteract overheating, many species cool off by covering themselves in sand. Monk seals may even dig up the cooler layers. The northern fur seal cools off by panting.

=== Sleep ===
Pinnipeds spend many months at a time at sea, so they must sleep in the water. Scientists have recorded elephant seals sleeping for minutes at a time while slowly drifting downward in a belly-up orientation. Like other marine mammals, seals sleep in water with half of their brain awake so that they can detect and escape from predators, as well as surface for air without fully waking. When they are asleep on land, both sides of their brain go into sleep mode.

== Distribution and habitat ==
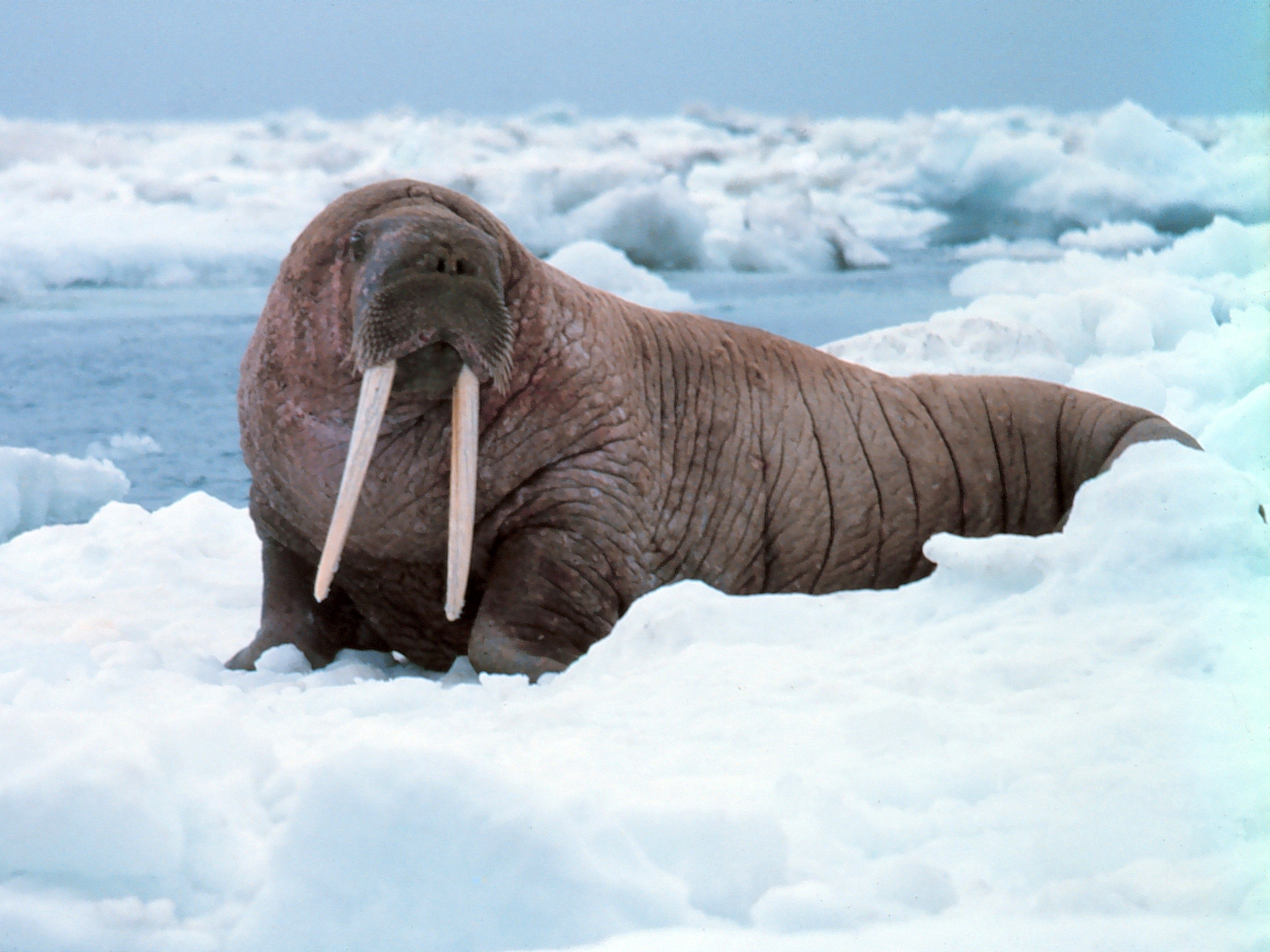
Walrus on ice off Alaska. This species has a discontinuous distribution around the Arctic Circle.

Living pinnipeds are widespread in cold oceanic waters; particularly in the North Atlantic, the North Pacific and the Southern Ocean. By contrast, the consistently warm Indomalayan waters have no seals. Monk seals and some otariids live in tropical and subtropical waters. Seals usually require cool, nutrient-rich waters with temperatures lower than 20 °C (68 °F). Even in more tropical climates, lower temperatures and biological productivity may be provided by currents. Only monk seals live in waters that generally lack these features. The Caspian seal and Baikal seal are found in large landlocked bodies of water (the Caspian Sea and Lake Baikal respectively).

As a whole, pinnipeds can be found in a variety of aquatic habitats, mostly coastal water, but also open ocean, deep waters near offshore islands, brackish waters and even freshwater lakes and rivers. The Baikal seal is the only exclusively freshwater species. Pinnipeds also use a number of terrestrial habitats and substrates, both continental and island. In non-polar regions, they haul out on to rocky shores, sandy and pebble beaches, sandbanks, tidal flats or pools, and in sea caves. Some species also rest on man-made structures built along the coast or offshore. Pinnipeds may move further from the water using sand dunes or vegetation, or even rocky cliffs. New Zealand sea lions may travel to forests 2 kilometres (1.2 mi) from the ocean. In polar regions, seals haul out on to both fast ice and drift ice. Some even den underneath the ice, particularly in pressure ridges and crevasses.

== Behavior and life history ==
Cape fur seals in water and at haulout

Pinnipeds have an amphibious lifestyle; they are mostly aquatic, but haul out to breed, molt, rest, sun or to avoid aquatic predators. Several species are known to migrate over vast distances, particularly in response to environmental changes. Elephant seals are at sea for most of the year and there are vast distances between their breeding and molting sites. The northern elephant seal is one of farthest mammalian migraters, traveling 18,000–21,000 km (11,000–13,000 mi). Otariids tend to migrate less than phocids, especially tropical species. Traveling seals may reach their destination using geomagnetic fields, water and wind currents, solar and lunar positions and the temperature and chemical makeup of the water.

Pinnipeds may dive during foraging or to avoid predators. When foraging, for example, the Weddell seal typically dives for no more than 15 minutes and 400 m (1,300 ft) deep, but can dive for as long as 73 minutes and reach 600 m (2,000 ft) deep. Northern elephant seals often dive 350–650 m (1,100–2,100 ft) for as long as 20 minutes. They can also dive 1,500 m (4,900 ft) and for over an hour. The dives of otariids tend to be shorter and less deep. They typically last 5–7 minutes with average depths to 30–45 m (100–150 ft). However, the New Zealand sea lion has been recorded diving to a maximum of 460 m (1,510 ft) and have submerged for as long as 12 minutes. The diet of walruses does not require them to dive very deep or very long. Pinnipeds generally live 25–30 years.

=== Foraging and predation ===
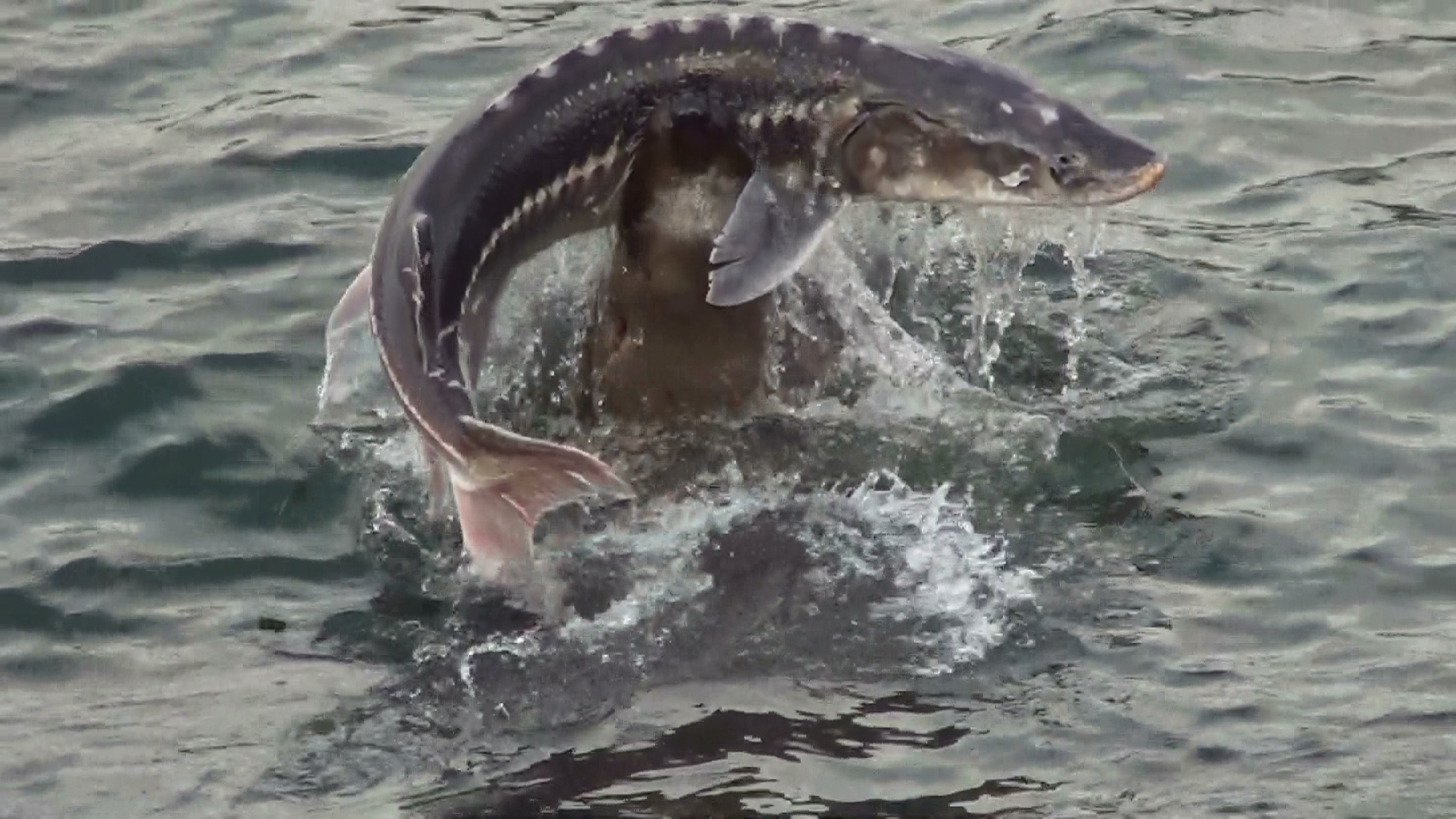
Steller sea lion capturing a white sturgeon

All pinnipeds are carnivorous and predatory. As a whole, they mostly feed on fish and cephalopods, but also consume crustaceans, bivalves, zooplankton and endothermic (warm-blooded) prey like sea birds. While most species have generalist diets, a few are specialists. Examples are krill-eating crabeater seals, crustacean-eating ringed seals, squid specialists like the Ross seal and southern elephant seal, and the bearded seal and walrus, which specialize on benthic invertebrates.

Pinnipeds may hunt solitarily or cooperatively. The former behavior is typical when hunting non-schooling fish, immobile or sluggish invertebrates and endothermic prey. Solitary foraging species usually hunt in coastal or shallow water. An exception to this is the northern elephant seal, which hunts deep in the open ocean for fish. In addition, walruses feed solitarily but are often near other walruses in small or large groups. For large schools of fish or squid, pinnipeds such as certain otariids hunt cooperatively in large groups, locating and herding their prey. Some species, such as California and South American sea lions, will hunt alongside sea birds and cetaceans.

Seals typically swallow their food whole, and will rip apart prey that is too big. The leopard seal, a prolific predator of penguins, is known to violently shake its prey to death. Complex serrations in the teeth of filter-feeding species, such as crabeater seals, allow water to leak out as they swallow their planktonic food. The walrus is unique in that it consumes its prey by suction feeding, using its tongue to suck the meat of a bivalve out of the shell. While pinnipeds mostly hunt in the water, South American sea lions are known to chase down penguins on land. Some species may swallow stones or pebbles for reasons not understood. Though they can drink seawater, pinnipeds get most of their fluid intake from their food.

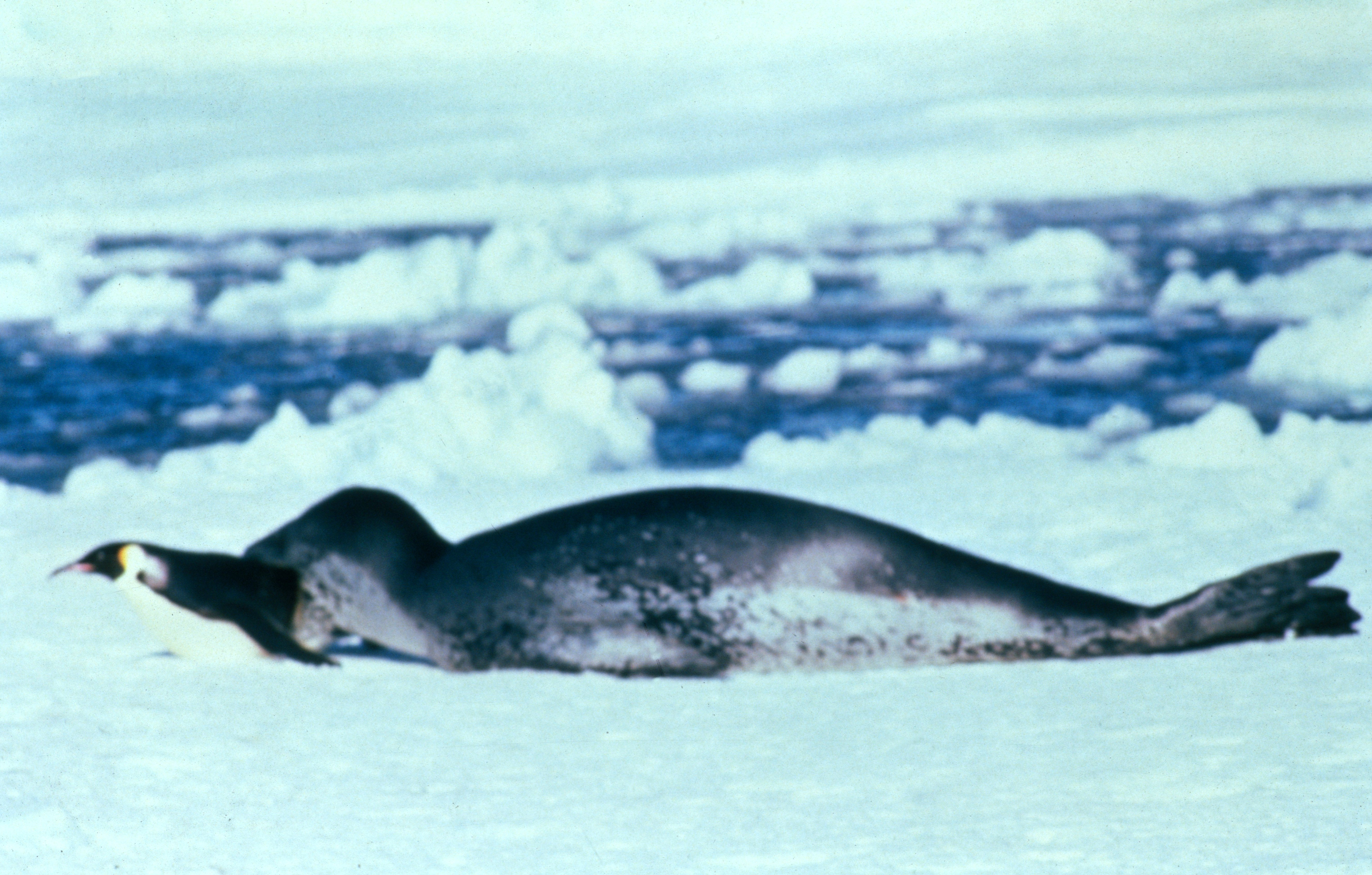
Leopard seal capturing an emperor penguin

Pinnipeds themselves are subject to predation. Most species are preyed on by the orca. To subdue and kill seals, orcas strike them with their heads or tails—the latter causing them to fly in the air—or simply bite into them and rip them apart. They are typically hunted by groups of 10 or fewer whales, but they are occasionally hunted by larger groups or by lone individuals. All age classes may be targeted, but pups most of all. Large sharks are another major predator of pinnipeds—usually the great white shark but also the tiger shark and mako shark. Sharks usually attack by ambushing them from below. Injured seals that escape are usually able to recover from their wounds. Otariids that have been targeted in the hindquarters are more likely to survive, while phocids are more likely to survive with forequarters injures. Pinnipeds are also preyed on by terrestrial and pagophilic predators. The polar bear is a major predator of Arctic seals and walruses, particularly pups. Bears may seek out seals, or simply wait for them to come by. Other terrestrial predators include cougars, brown hyenas and various species of canids, which mostly target the young.

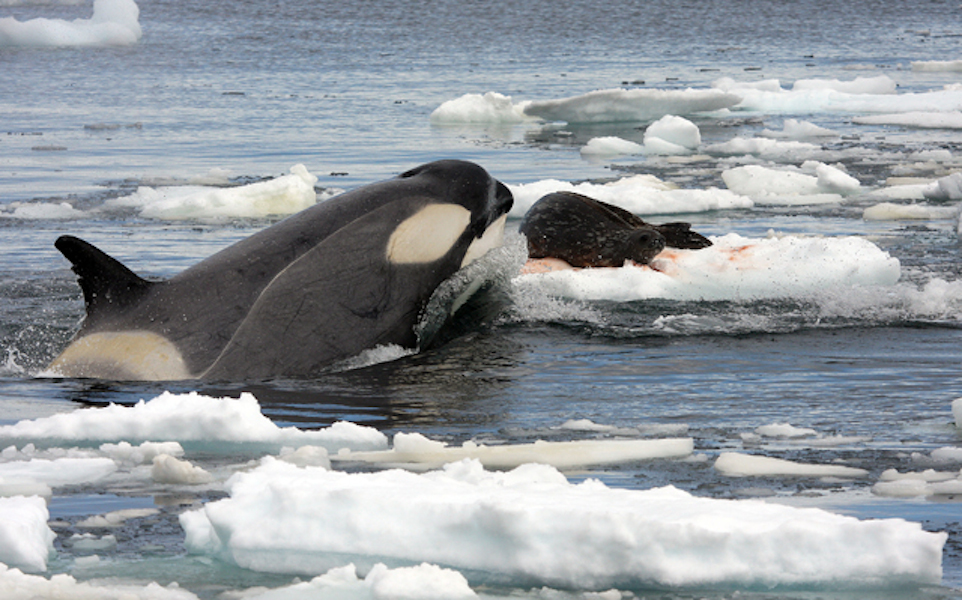
Orca hunting a Weddell seal

Pinnipeds lessen the chance of predation by gathering in groups. Some species are capable of inflicting damaging wounds on their attackers with their sharp canines; adult walruses are particularly risky prey for polar bears. Cape fur seals will even mob white sharks. When out at sea, northern elephant seals dive out of the reach of surface-hunting orcas and white sharks. In the Antarctic, which lacks terrestrial predators, pinniped species spend more time on the ice than their Arctic counterparts.

Interspecific predation among pinnipeds does occur. The leopard seal is known to prey on many other species, especially the crabeater seal. Leopard seals typically target crabeater pups, particularly from November to January. Older crabeater seals commonly bear scars from failed leopard seal attacks; a 1977 study found that 75% of a sample of 85 individual crabeaters had these scars. Walruses, despite being specialized for feeding on bottom-dwelling invertebrates, occasionally prey on Arctic seals. They kill their prey with their long tusks and eat their blubber and skin. Steller sea lions have been recorded eating harbor seals, northern fur seals and California sea lions, particularly pups and small adults. New Zealand sea lions feed on pups of some fur seal species, and the South American sea lion may prey on South American fur seals. In addition, cannibalism has been documented among various pinniped species.

=== Reproductive behavior ===
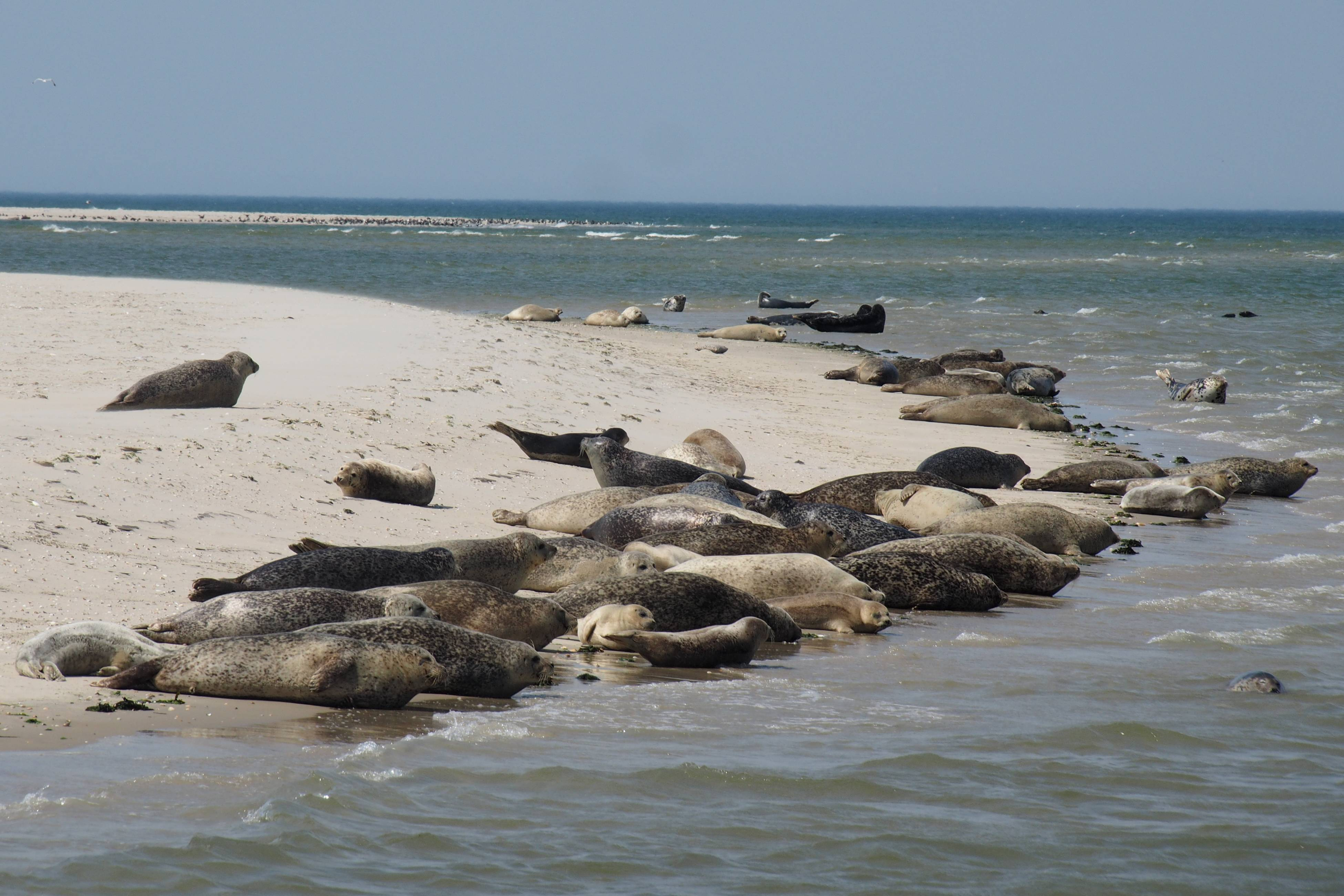
Harbor seals on sandy beach. This species breeds on land but mates in the water.

The mating system of pinnipeds varies from extreme polygyny to serial monogamy. Species that breed on land are usually more polygynous, as females gather in large aggregations and males are able to mate with them as well as defend them from rivals. These species include elephant seals, grey seals and most otariids. Land-breeding pinnipeds prefer to mate on islands where there are fewer land predators. Suitable islands are in short supply and tend to be crowded. Since the land they breed on is fixed, females return to the same sites for many years. The males arrive earlier in the season and wait for them. The males stay on land to monopolize females; and may fast for months as they would lose their position if they went to feed at sea. Polygynous species also tend to be extremely sexually dimorphic in favor of males. This dimorphism manifests itself in larger chests and necks, longer canines and denser fur—all traits that equip males for combat. Larger males have more blubber and thus more energy reserves for fasting.

Other seals, like the walrus and most phocids, breed on ice and copulate in the water—a few land-breeding species also mate in water. Females of these species tend to be more spaced out and there is less site fidelity, since ice is less stable than solid land. Hence polygyny tends to be weaker in ice-breeding species. An exception to this is the walrus, whose distribution of food forces females closer together. Pinnipeds that breed on fast ice tend to cluster together more than those that breed on drift ice. Seals that breed on ice tend to have little or no sexual dimorphism. In Antarctic seals, there is some size bias in favor of females. Walruses and hooded seals are unique among ice-breeding species in that they have pronounced sexual dimorphism in favor of males.

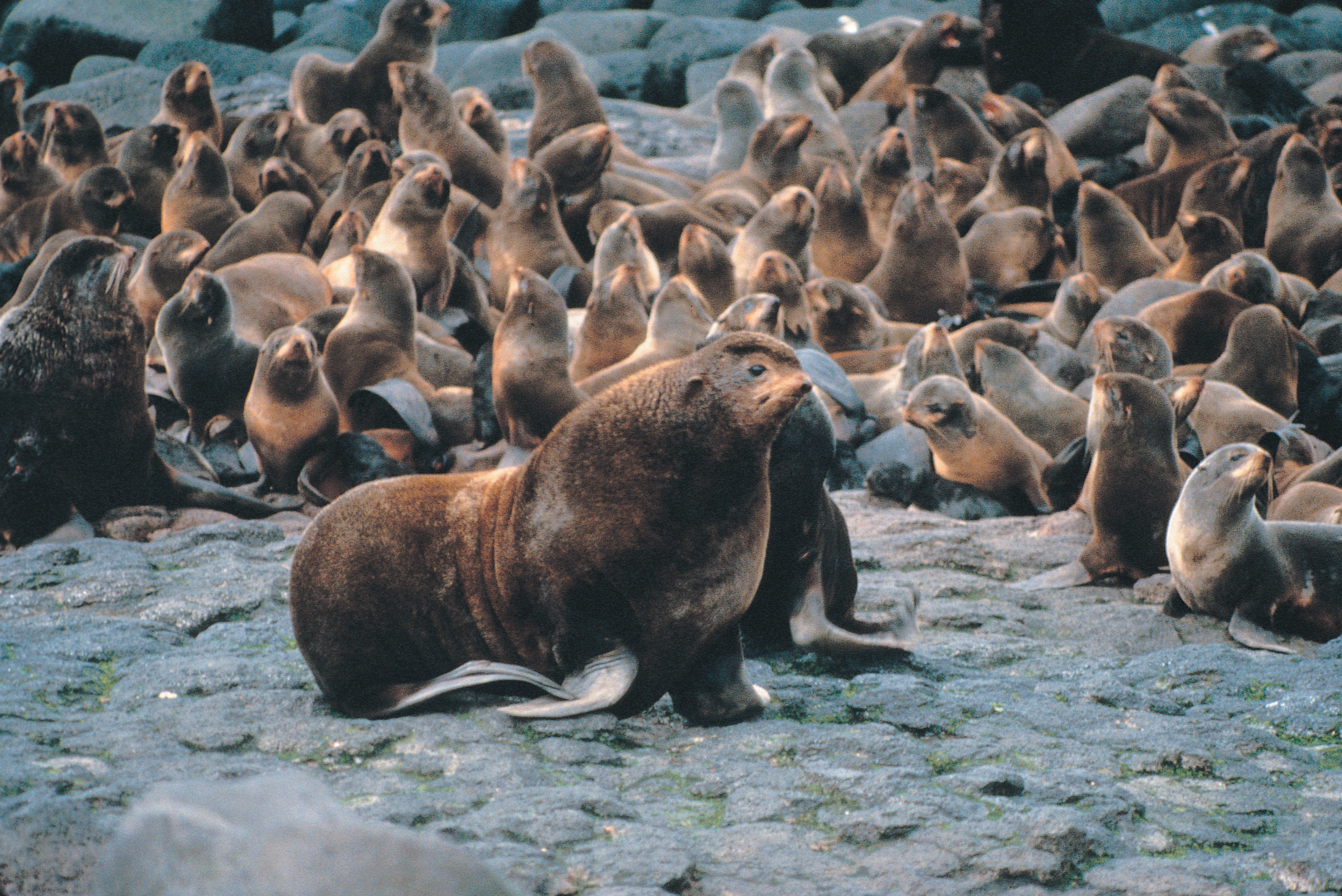
Northern fur seal breeding colony

Adult male pinnipeds have several strategies to ensure reproductive success. Otariid males gain access to females by establishing territories where females can bask and give birth and contain valuable resources such as shade, tide pools or access to water. Territories are usually marked by natural barriers, and some may be fully or partially underwater. Males defend their territorial boundaries with threatening vocalizations and postures, but physical fights are usually not very violent, and are mostly limited to early in the season. Individuals also return to the same territorial site each breeding season. In certain species, like the Steller sea lion and northern fur seal, a dominant male can maintain a territory for as long as 2–3 months. Females can usually move freely between territories and males are unable to coerce females who are intent on leaving, but in some species such as the northern fur seal, South American sea lion and Australian sea lion, males keep females in their territories with threatening displays and even violence. In some phocid species, like the harbor seal, Weddell seal and bearded seal, the males establish "maritories" and patrol and defend the waters bordering female haul-out areas, waiting for a female to enter. These are also maintained by vocalizations. The maritories of Weddell seal males include entries to female breathing holes in the ice.

Male northern elephant seals fighting for dominance and females

Lek systems are known to exist among some populations of walruses. These males gather near female herds and try to attract them with elaborate courtship displays and vocalizations. Lekking may also exist among California sea lions, South American fur seals, New Zealand sea lions and harbor seals. In some species, including elephant seals, grey seals and non-lekking walruses, males will try to lay claim to the desired females and defend them from rivals. Elephant seal males, in particular, establish dominance hierarchies via displays and fights, with the highest ranking males having a near monopoly on reproductive success. An alpha male can have a harem of 100 females. Grey seal males usually place themselves among a cluster of females whose members may change over time, while males of some walrus populations guard female herds. Male ringed, crabeater, spotted and hooded seals follow and defend nearby females and mate with them when they reach estrus. These may be lone females or small groups. South American sea lions are considered to be both a territory-defending and female-defending species, with males laying claim to both territories and individual pre-estrus females.

Younger or subdominant male pinnipeds may attempt to achieve reproductive success in other ways including sneakiness, harassment of departing females or even group raids. Female pinnipeds do appear to have some choice in mates, particularly in lek-breeding species like the walrus, but also in elephant seals where the males try to dominate all the females that they want to mate with. When a female elephant seal or grey seal is mounted by an unwanted male, she tries to resist and get away. This commotion attracts other males to the scene, and the most dominant will take over and mate with female himself. Dominant female elephant seals stay in the center of the colony where they are in the domain of a more dominant male, while marginal females are left with subordinates. Female Steller sea lions may solicit their territorial males for mating.

=== Birth and parenting ===
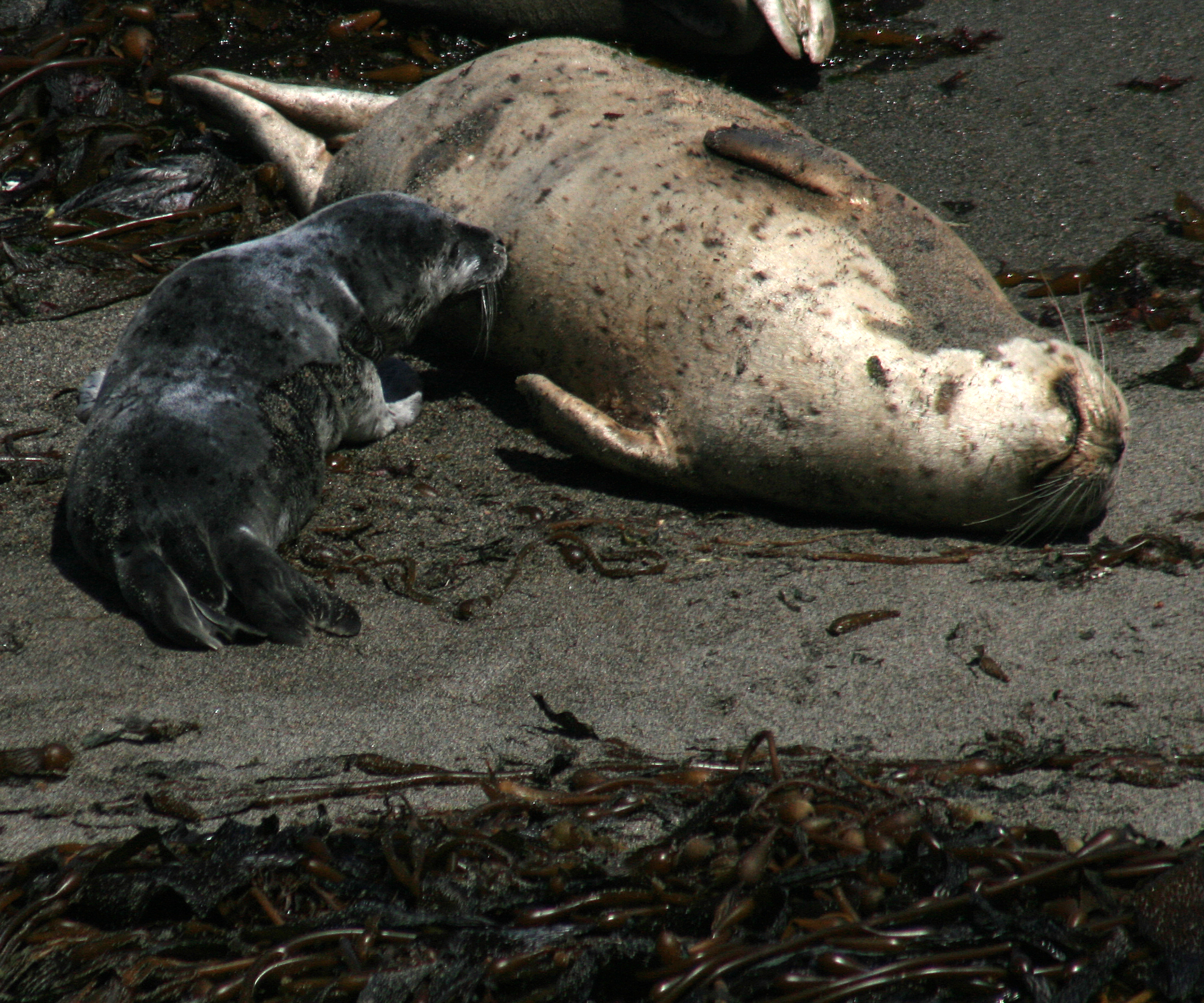
Harbor seal mother nursing pup

Otariids enter estrus shortly after giving birth, while phocids can mate again during late lactation or when their young are weaned and walruses have five- to six-year gaps between births. All species have delayed implantation, in which the embryo does not enter the uterus for weeks or months. Delayed implantation allows the female to wait until conditions are right for birthing. Gestation in seals (including delayed implantation) typically lasts a year. For most species, birthing takes place in spring and summer. Usually, single pups are born; twins are rare and have high mortality rates. Pups of most species are born relatively developed and precocial.

Pinniped milk has "little to no lactose". Mother pinnipeds have different strategies for maternal care and lactation. Phocids such as elephant seals, grey seals and hooded seals have a lactation period that lasts days or weeks, during which they fast and nurse their pups on land or ice. The milk of these species consists of up to 60% fat, allowing the young to grow quickly. Each day until they are weaned, northern elephant seal pups gain 4 kg (9 lb). Some pups gain weight more quickly than others by stealing extra milk from other mothers. Alloparenting occurs in these fasting species; while most northern elephant seal mothers nurse their own pups and reject nursings from alien pups, some do accept alien pups with their own.

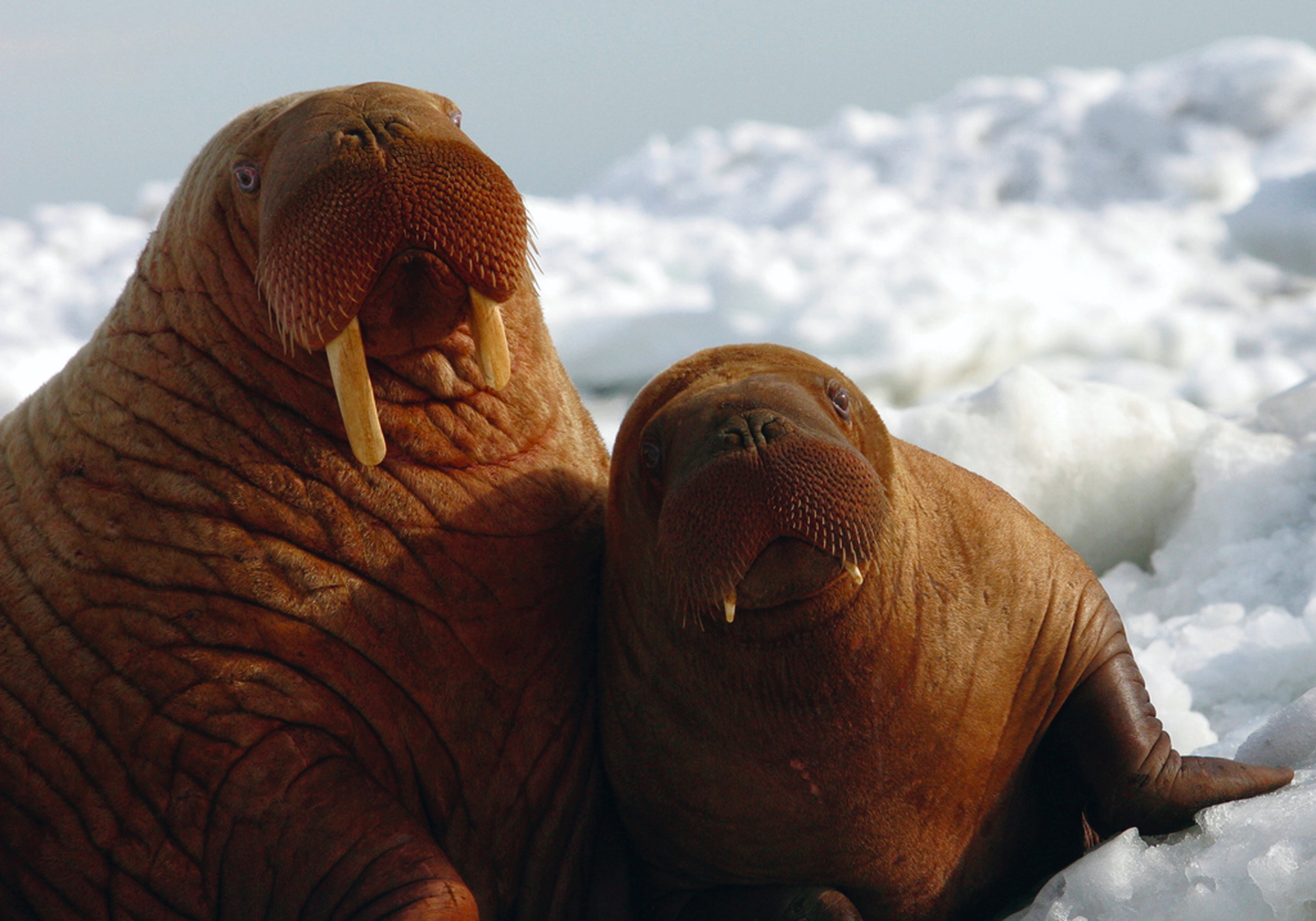
Mother walrus with calf

For otariids and some phocids like the harbor seal, mothers fast and nurse their pups for a few days at a time. In between nursing bouts, the females forage at sea while the young stay behind onshore. If there is enough food close to shore, a female can be gone for as little as a day, but otherwise may be at sea for as long as three weeks. Lactation in otariids may last 6–11 months; in the Galápagos fur seal it can last up to three years. Pups of these species are weaned at heavier weights than their phocid counterparts, but the latter grow quicker. Walruses are unique in that mothers nurse their young at sea. Young pinnipeds typically start swimming on their own and some species can even swim as newborns. Young may wait days or weeks before entering the water; elephant seals start swimming weeks after weaning.

Male pinnipeds generally play little role in raising the young. Male walruses may help inexperienced young as they learn to swim, and have even been recorded caring for orphans. When a group is threatened, all the adults may protect the young. Male California sea lions have been observed to help shield swimming pups from predators. Males can also pose threats to the safety of pups, particularly during fights. Pups of some species may be abducted, assaulted and killed by males, possibly due to sexual frustration.

=== Communication ===
Vocalization of female Antarctic fur seal

Pinnipeds can produce a number of vocalizations. While most vocals are audible to the human ear, Weddell seals have been recorded in Antarctica making ultrasonic calls underwater. In addition, the vocals of northern elephant seals may produce infrasonic vibrations. Vocals are produced both in air and underwater; the former are more common among otariids and the latter among phocids. Antarctic seals are noisier on land or ice than Arctic seals due to the absence of polar bears. Male vocals are usually deeper than those of the females. Vocalizations are particularly important during the breeding seasons. Dominant male elephant seals display their status and power with "clap-threats" and loud drum-like calls that may be modified by the proboscis. Male otariids have strong barks, growls and roars. Male walruses are known to produce gong-like calls when attempting to attract females, these are amplified underwater with inflatable throat sacs.

The Weddell seal has perhaps the most extensive vocal repertoire, producing both airborne and underwater sounds. Trilling, gluping, chirping, chugging and knocking are some examples of the calls produced underwater. When warning other seals, the calls may be pronounced by "prefixes" and "suffixes". The underwater vocals of Weddell seals can last 70 seconds, which is long for a marine mammal call. Some calls have about seven rhythm patterns and could be categorized as "songs". Similar calls have been recorded in other Antarctic seals and in bearded seals. In some pinniped species, there appear to be regional dialects or even individual variations in vocalizations. These differences are likely important for territorial males recognizing their neighbors and mothers and pups who need to remain in contact on crowded beaches. Female seals emit a "pulsed, bawling" contact call, while pups respond by squawking. Contact calls are particularly important for otariid mothers returning from sea. Other vocalizations produced by seals include grunts, rasps, rattles, creaks, warbles, clicks and whistles.

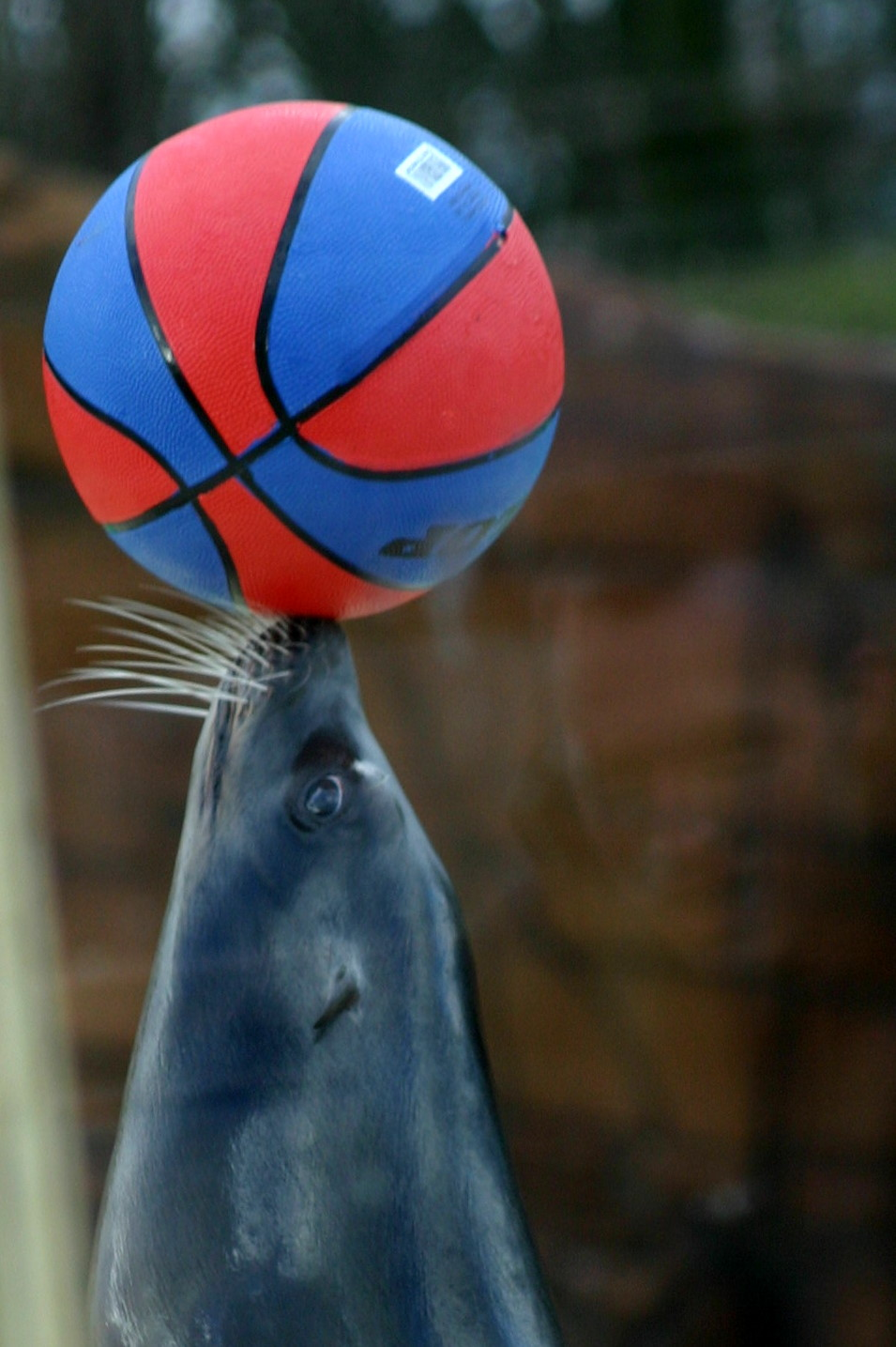
Sea lion balancing a ball

Non-vocal communication is not as common in pinnipeds as in cetaceans. Nevertheless, when they feel threatened, hauled-out harbor seals and Baikal seals may slap themselves with their flippers to create a warning sound. Teeth chattering, hisses and exhalations are also made as aggressive warnings by pinnipeds. Visual displays also occur: Ross seals resting on the ice will show the stripes on their chests and bare their teeth to a perceived threat, while swimming Weddell seals will make an S-shaped posture to intimidate rivals under the ice. Male hooded seals use their inflatable nasal membranes to display to and attract females.

=== Intelligence ===
In a match-to-sample task study, a single California sea lion was able to demonstrate an understanding of symmetry, transitivity and equivalence; a second seal was unable to complete the tasks. They demonstrate the ability to understand simple syntax and commands when taught an artificial sign language, though they only rarely used the signs semantically or logically. In 2011, a captive California sea lion named Ronan was recorded bobbing its head in synchrony to musical rhythms. This "rhythmic entrainment" was previously seen only in humans, parrots and other birds possessing vocal mimicry. Harbor seals have been found to adapt quickly when presented with changes to stimuli in regards to rewards and non-rewards. Adult male elephant seals can recognize each other's vocalizations by remembering the rhythm and timbre. In the 1970s, a captive harbor seal named Hoover was trained to imitate human speech and laughter.

For sea lions used in entertainment, trainers toss a ball at the animal or simply place the object on its nose, so it will eventually understand the behavior desired. A sea lion may need a year of training before it can publicly perform. Its long-term memory allows it to perform a trick after as much as three months of non-performance.

== Human relations ==
=== In culture ===
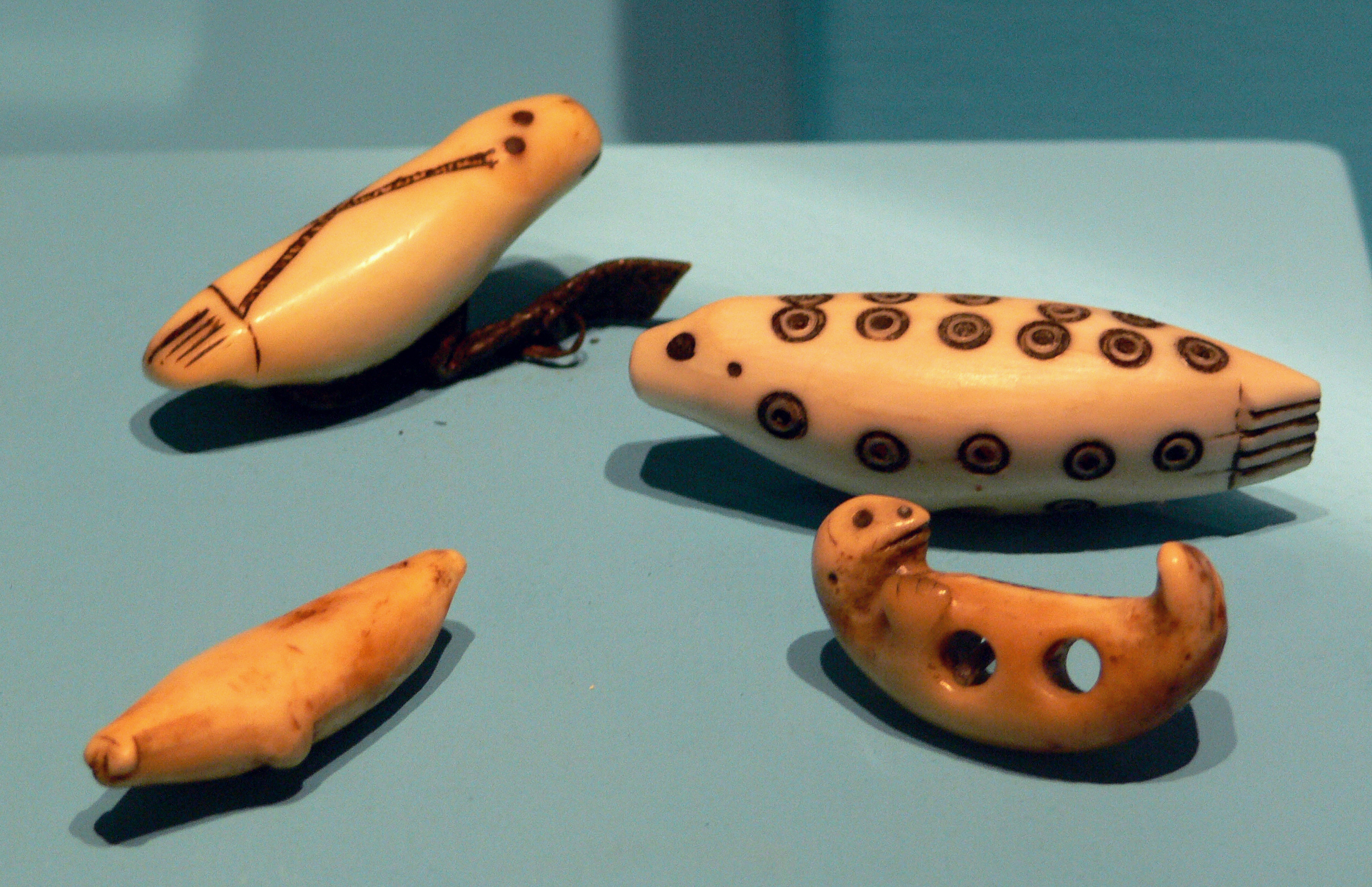
Inuit seal sculptures at the Linden Museum

Various human cultures have for millennia depicted pinnipeds. In Homer's Odyssey, the sea god Proteus shepherds a colony of seals. (Note: Odyssey, book IV, verses 404–413.) In northern Scotland, Celts of Orkney and the Hebrides believed in selkies—seals that could change into humans and walk on land. In Inuit mythology, they are associated with the goddess Sedna, who sometimes transformed into a seal. It was believed that marine mammals, including seals, came from her severed fingers. In modern culture, pinnipeds are thought of as cute, playful and comical figures.

=== In captivity ===
Pinnipeds can be found in facilities around the world, as their size and playfulness make them popular attractions. Seals have been kept in captivity since at least ancient Rome and their trainability was noticed by Pliny the Elder. (Note: Natural History, book IX, XV:41–43.) Zoologist Georges Cuvier noted during the 19th century that wild seals show considerable affection for humans and stated that they are second only to some monkeys among wild animals in their easy tamability. Francis Galton noted in his seminal work on domestication that seals were a spectacular example of an animal that would most likely never be domesticated, despite their friendliness, survivability and "desire for comfort", because they serve no practical use for humans.

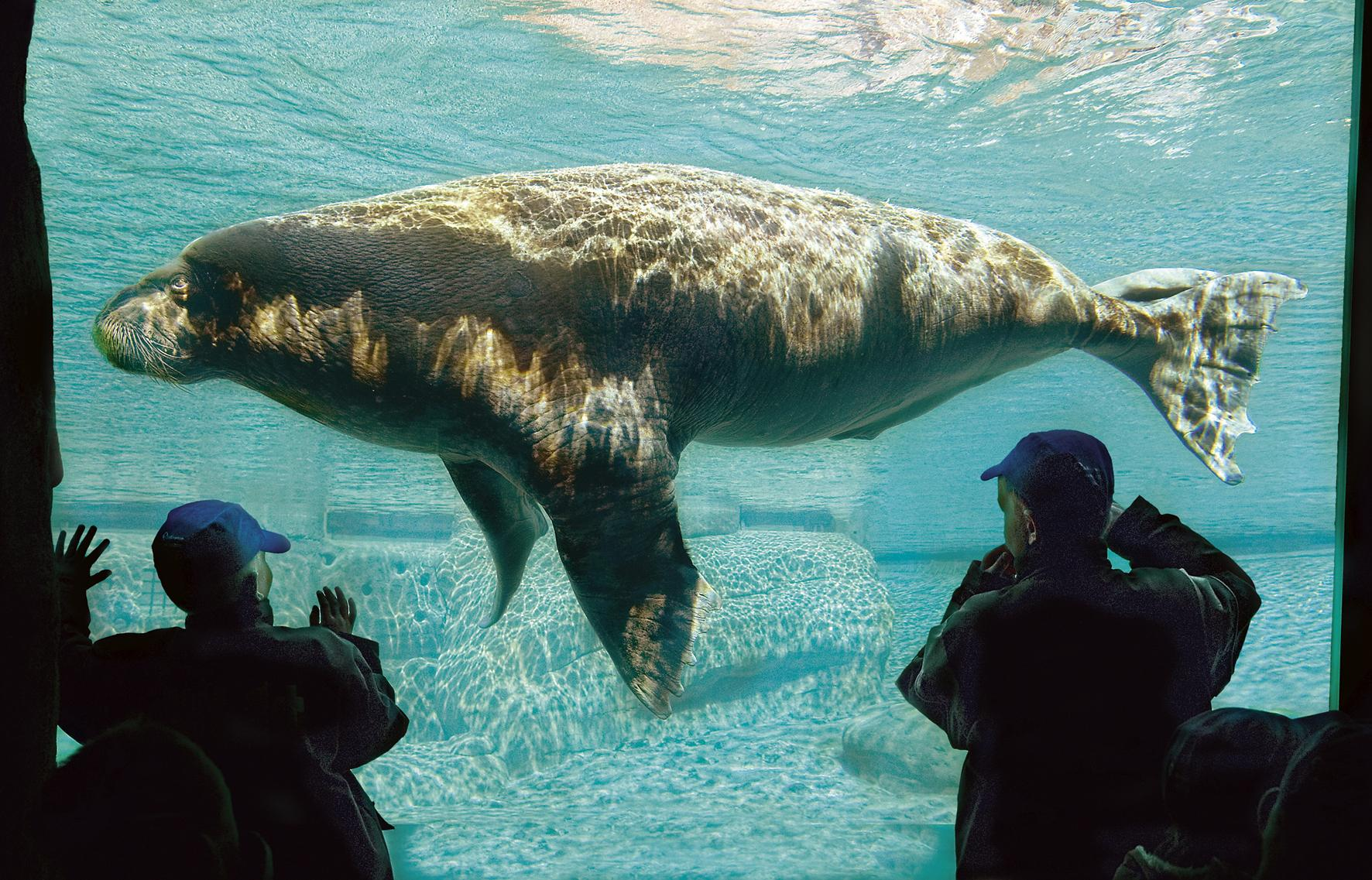
Walrus at Dolfinarium Harderwijk, Netherlands

Some modern exhibits have a pool with artificial haul-out sites and a rocky background, while others have seals housed in shelters located above a pool which they can jump into. More elaborate exhibits contain deep pools that can be viewed underwater with rock-mimicking cement as haul-out areas. The most popular captive pinniped is the California sea lion, due to its trainability and adaptability. Other commonly kept species include the grey seal and harbor seal. Larger animals like walruses and Steller sea lions are much less common. Some organizations, such as the Humane Society of the United States and World Animal Protection, object to keeping marine mammals in captivity. They state that the exhibits could not be large enough to house animals that have evolved to be migratory, and a pool could never replace the size and biodiversity of the ocean. They also state that the tricks performed for audiences are "exaggerated variations of their natural behaviors" and distract the people from the animal's unnatural environment.

California sea lions are used in military applications by the U.S. Navy Marine Mammal Program, including detecting naval mines and enemy divers. In the Persian Gulf, the animals have been trained to swim behind divers approaching a U.S. naval ship and attach a clamp with a rope to the diver's leg. Navy officials say that the sea lions can do this in seconds, before the enemy realizes what happened. Organizations like PETA believe that such operations put the animals in danger. The Navy insists that the sea lions are removed once their job is done.

=== Hunting ===
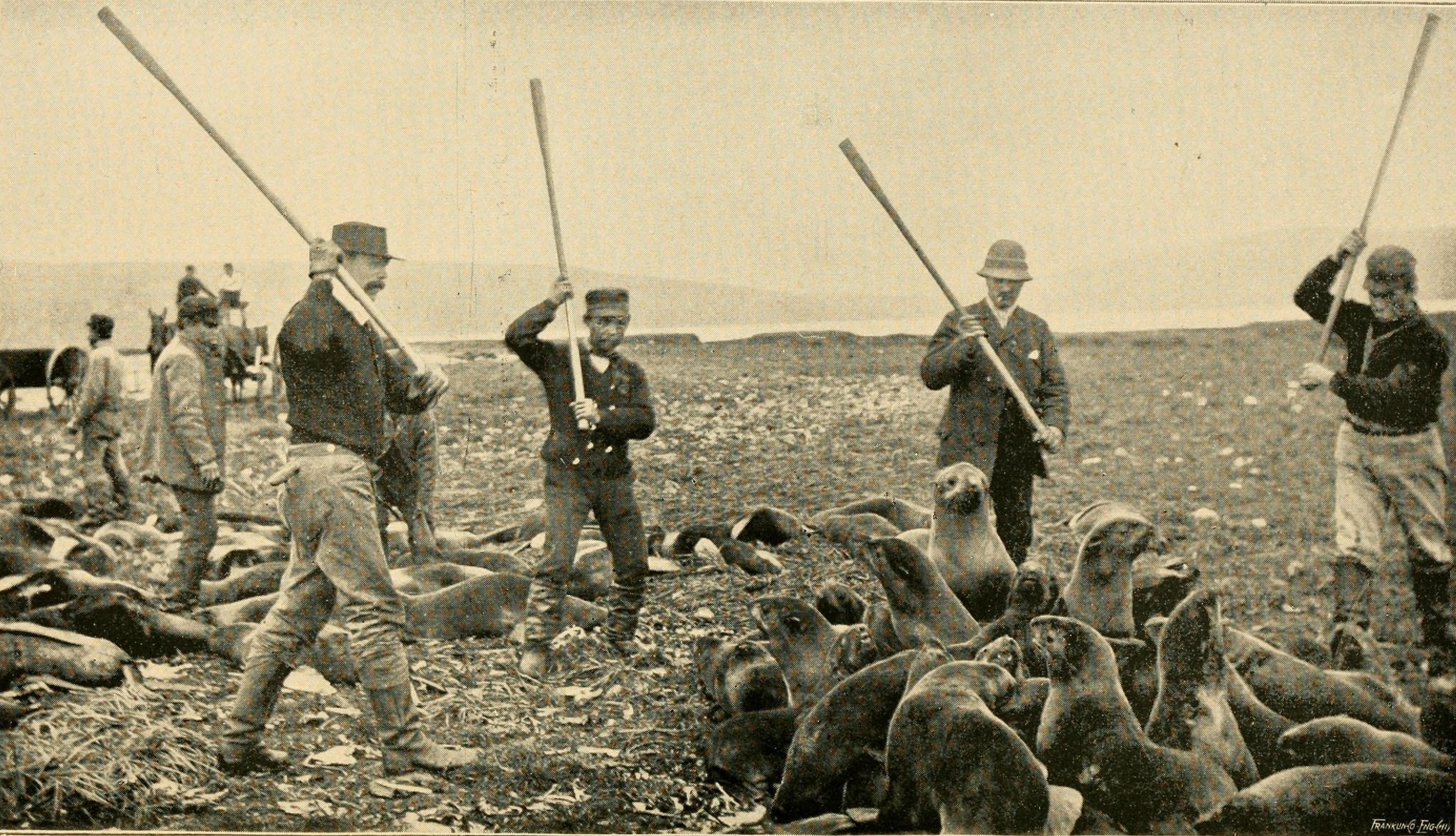
Men killing northern fur seals on Saint Paul Island, Alaska, in the mid-1890s.

Humans have hunted seals since the Stone Age. Originally, seals were merely hit with clubs during haul-out. Eventually, more lethal weapons were used, like spears and harpoons. They were also trapped in nets. The use of firearms in seal hunting during the modern era drastically increased the number of killings. Pinnipeds are typically hunted for their meat and blubber. The skins of fur seals and phocids are made into coats, and the tusks of walruses have been used as ivory. There is a distinction made between the subsistence hunting of seals by indigenous peoples of the Arctic and commercial hunting: subsistence hunters depend on seal products for survival. National and international authorities have given special treatment to aboriginal hunters since their methods of killing are seen as more sustainable and smaller in scope. However indigenous people have recently used more modern technology and are profiting more from seal products in the marketplace. Some anthropologists argue that the term "subsistence" should also apply to these activities, as long as they are local in scale. More than 100,000 phocids (especially ringed seals) as well as around 10,000 walruses are harvested annually by native hunters.

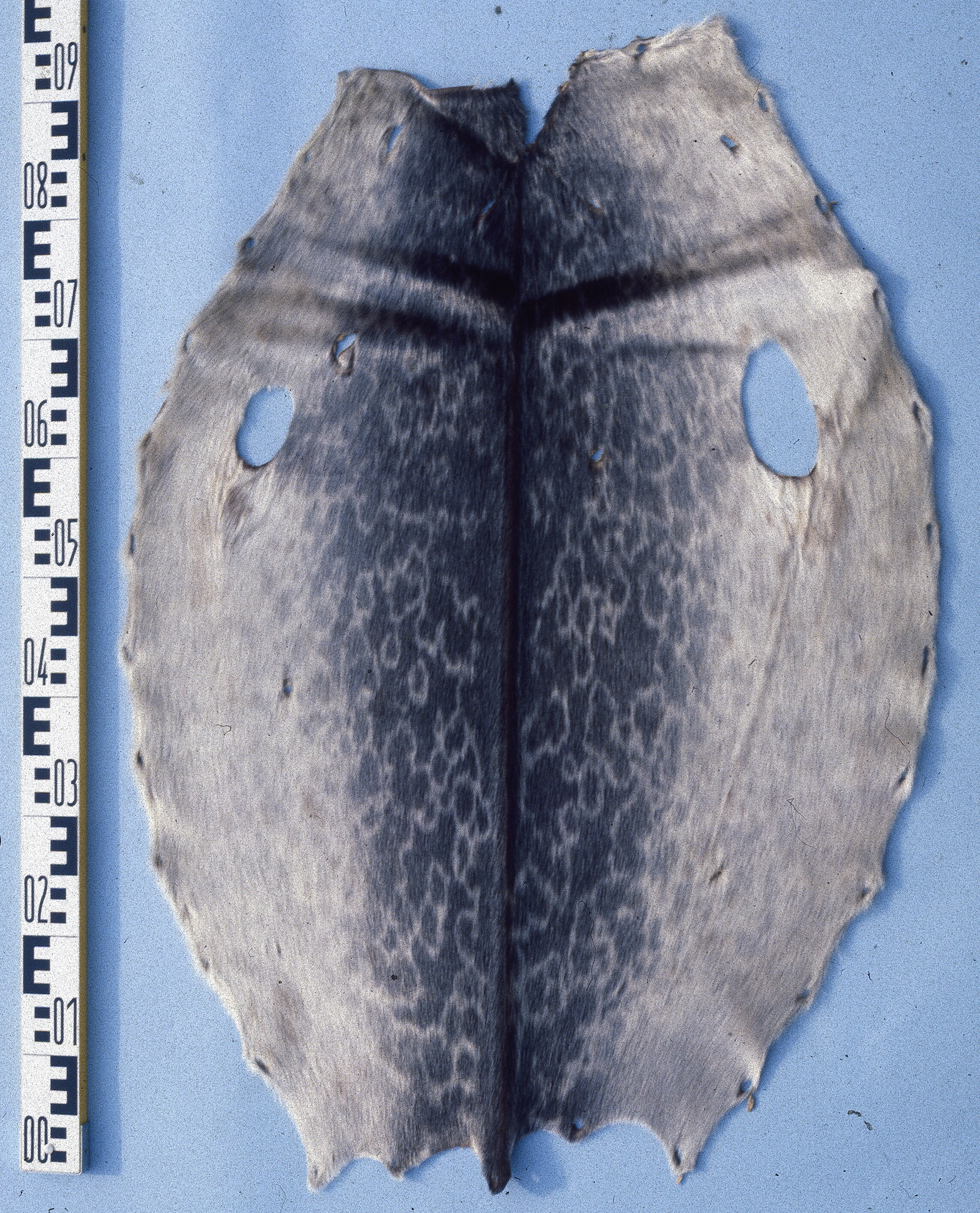
Ringed seal skinned coat

Commercial sealing rivaled whaling as an important industry throughout history. Harvested species included harp seals, hooded seals, Caspian seals, elephant seals, walruses and all species of fur seal. After the 1960s, the harvesting of seals decreased substantially as an industry after the Canadian government implemented measures to protect female seals and restrict the hunting season. Several species that were commercially exploited have rebounded in numbers; for example, Antarctic fur seals may have reached their pre-harvesting numbers. The northern elephant seal nearly went extinct in the late 19th century, with only a small population remaining on Guadalupe Island. It has since recolonized much of its historic range, but has a population bottleneck. Conversely, the Mediterranean monk seal was extirpated from much of the Mediterranean and its current range is still limited.

Several species of pinniped continue to be exploited. The Convention for the Conservation of Antarctic Seals protects species within the Antarctic and surrounding waters, but allows restricted hunting of crabeater seals, leopard seals and Weddell seals. Weddell seal hunting is forbidden between September and February if the animal is older than a year, to ensure healthy population growth. The Government of Canada permits the hunting of harp seals. This has been met with controversy and debate. Proponents of seal hunts insist that the animals are killed humanely and the white-coated pups are not taken, while opponents argue that it is irresponsible to kill harp seals as they are already threatened by declining habitat.

The Caribbean monk seal has been killed and exploited by European settlers and their descendants since 1494, starting with Christopher Columbus himself. The seals were easy targets for organized sealers, fishermen, turtle hunters and buccaneers because they evolved with little pressure from terrestrial predators and were thus "genetically tame". In the Bahamas, as many as 100 seals were slaughtered in one night. The species was considered to be already extinct by the mid-nineteenth century until a small colony was found near the Yucatán Peninsula in 1866. Seal killings continued, and the last reliable report of the animal alive was in 1952 at Serranilla Bank. The IUCN declared it extinct in 1996. The Japanese sea lion was common around the Japanese islands, but overexploitation and competition from fisheries drastically decreased the population in the 1930s. The last recorded individual was a juvenile in 1974.

== Conservation issues ==
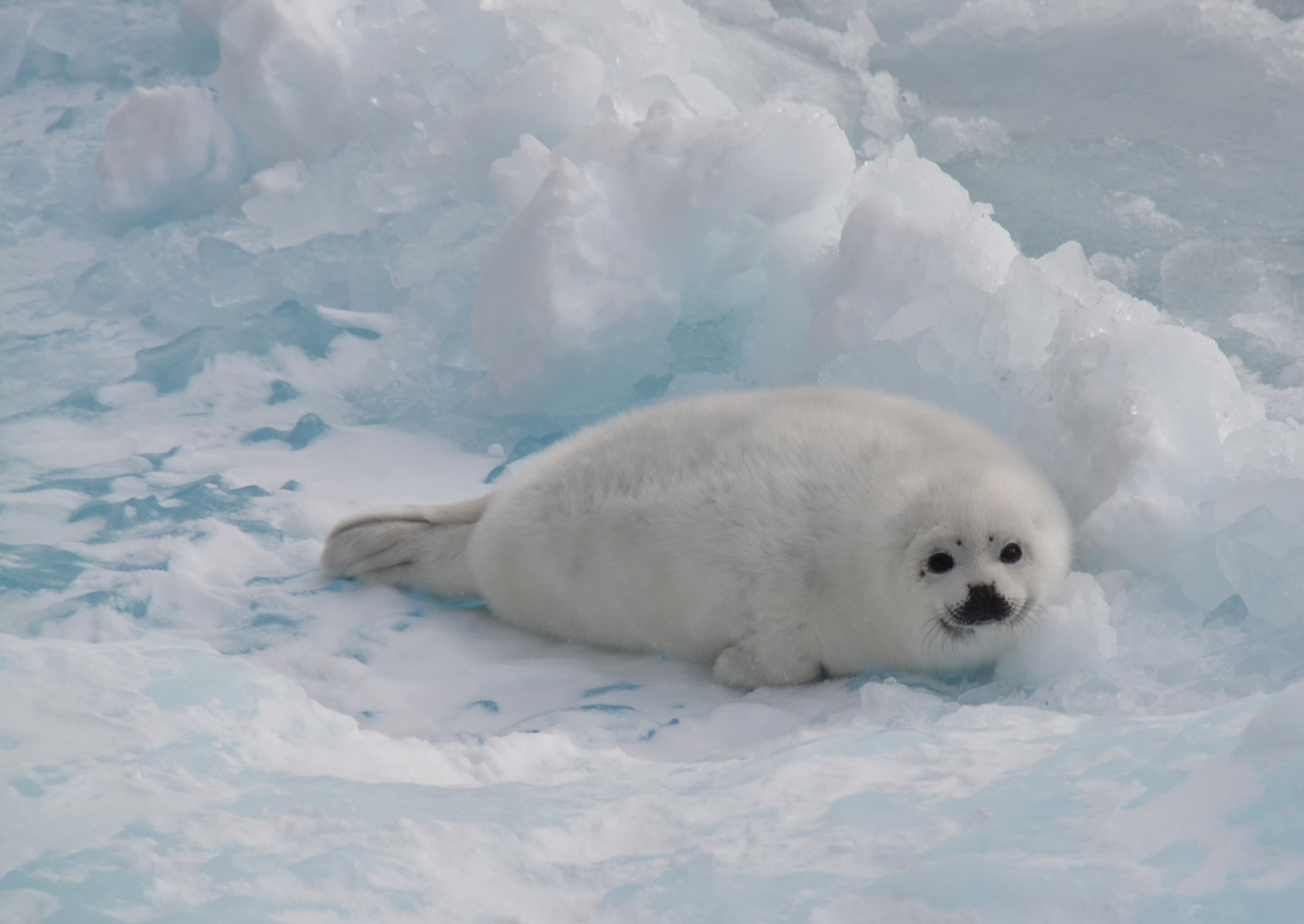
Harp seal pup. This ice-living species is vulnerable to the effects of climate change

As of 2021, the International Union for Conservation of Nature (IUCN) recognizes 36 pinniped species. With the Japanese sea lion and the Caribbean monk seal recently extinct, ten more are considered at risk. They are ranked as:

- "Endangered": Hawaiian monk seal, Mediterranean monk seal, Galápagos fur seal, Australian sea lion, New Zealand sea lion, Caspian seal, and Galápagos sea lion.
- "Vulnerable": northern fur seal, hooded seal, and walrus.

Pinnipeds face various threats. They are unintentionally caught in fishing nets by commercial fisheries and accidentally swallow fishing hooks. Gillnetting and seine netting is a significant cause of mortality in seals and other marine mammals. Species commonly entangled include California sea lions, Hawaiian monk seals, northern fur seals and Cape fur seals. Pinnipeds are also affected by marine pollution. Organic chemicals tend to accumulate in these animals since they are high in the food chain and have large reserves of blubber. Lactating mothers can pass the toxins on to their young. These pollutants can cause gastrointestinal cancers, and decreased fertility and immunity to infectious diseases. Other man-made threats include habitat destruction by oil and gas exploitation, encroachment by boats, and underwater noise.

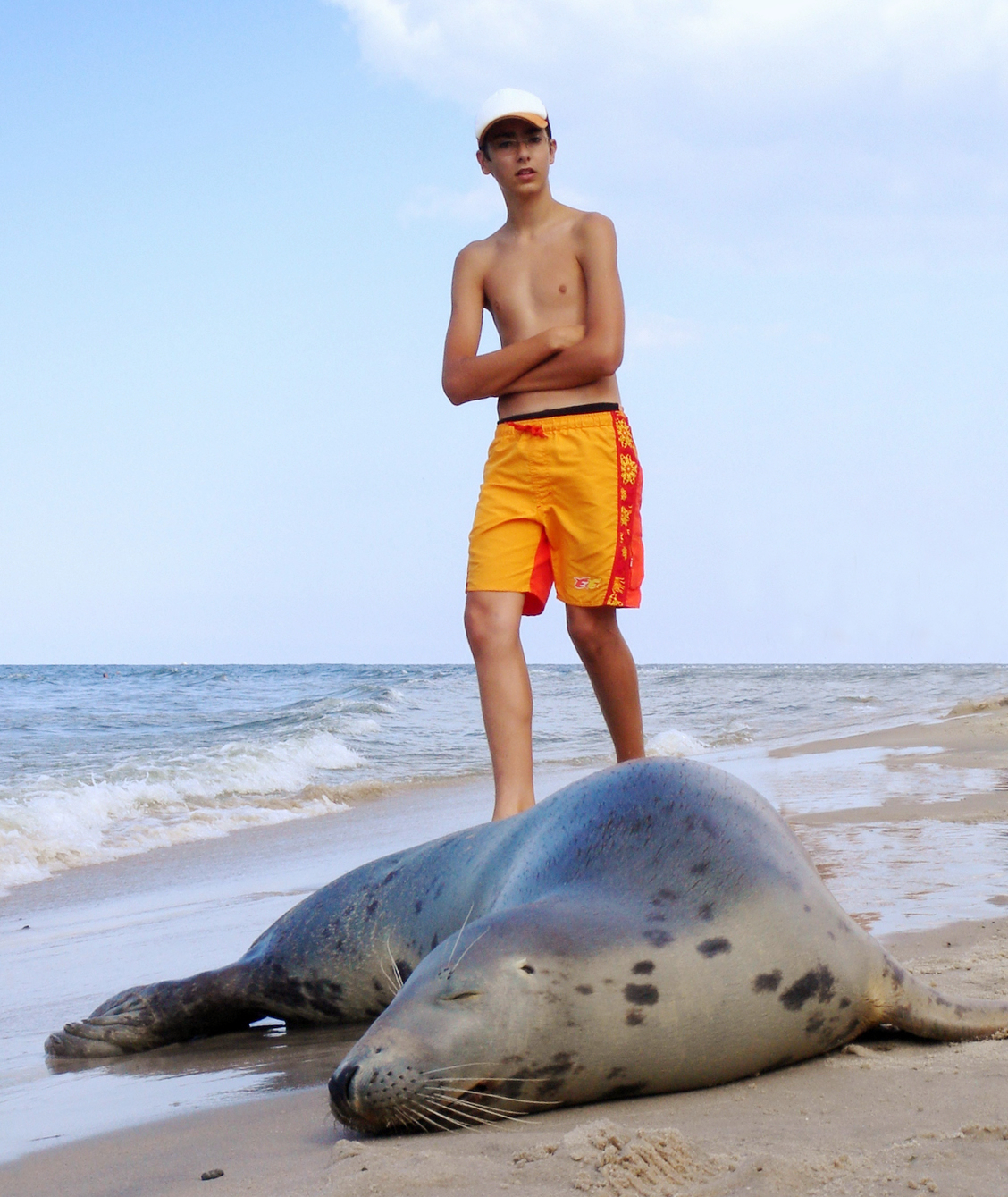
Grey seal on beach occupied by humans near Niechorze, Poland. Pinnipeds and humans may compete for space and resources.

Species that live in polar habitats are vulnerable to the effects of climate change on oceans, particularly declines in sea ice. In 2010 and 2011, sea ice in the Northwest Atlantic was at or near an all-time low and harp seals as well as ringed seals that bred on thin ice saw increased death rates. In the Antarctic, the decreased duration and extent of the sea ice and nutrient availability could potentially reduce the survival of Weddell seal pups and may have important implications for population growth rates. Antarctic fur seals in South Georgia in the South Atlantic saw major decreases over a 20-year study, during which scientists measured increased sea surface temperature anomalies.

Some species have become so numerous that they conflict with local people. In the United States, pinnipeds are protected under the Marine Mammal Protection Act of 1972 (MMPA). Since that year, California sea lion populations have risen to 250,000. These animals began exploiting more man-made environments, like docks, for haul-out sites. Many docks are not designed to withstand the weight of several resting sea lions. Wildlife managers have used various methods to control the animals, and some city officials have redesigned docks so they can better resist sea lion use. Inland-living New Zealand sea lions face unique human conflicts such as road mortality and run-ins with human infrastructure. Seals also conflict with fisheries; a 2024 metastudy found that globally pinnipeds affected over 33 percent of fishing days and stole over 13 percent of catches. In 2007, MMPA was amended to permit the lethal removal of sea lions from salmon runs at Bonneville Dam. In the 1980s and 1990s, South African politicians and fishermen demanded that brown fur seals be culled, believing that the animals competed with commercial fisheries. Scientific studies found that culling fur seals would actually have a negative effect on the fishing industry, and the culling option was dropped in 1993.

Population monitoring methods for pinnipeds increasingly include aerial imagery and automated image-processing workflows, which can support repeated surveys of colonies and haul-out sites.
