= Panniculus adiposus =

Fatty tissue layer under the skin

Details

Identifiers
- Latin: panniculus adiposus
- TA98: A16.0.03.002
- TA2: 7084
- TH: H3.12.00.2.00002
- FMA: 82501

The panniculus adiposus is the fatty layer of the subcutaneous tissues superficial to the panniculus carnosus a layer of vestigial muscle beneath it.

It includes structures that are considered fascia by some sources but not by others. Some examples include the fascia of Camper and the superficial cervical fascia.

A group of disorders of inflammation of this layer is called panniculitis.
