= Superficial cervical fascia =

The superficial cervical fascia is a thin layer of subcutaneous connective tissue that lies between the dermis of the skin and the deep cervical fascia. It contains the platysma, cutaneous nerves from the cervical plexus, blood vessels, and lymphatic vessels. It also contains a varying amount of fat, which is its distinguishing characteristic. It is considered by some to be a part of the panniculus adiposus, and not true fascia.
