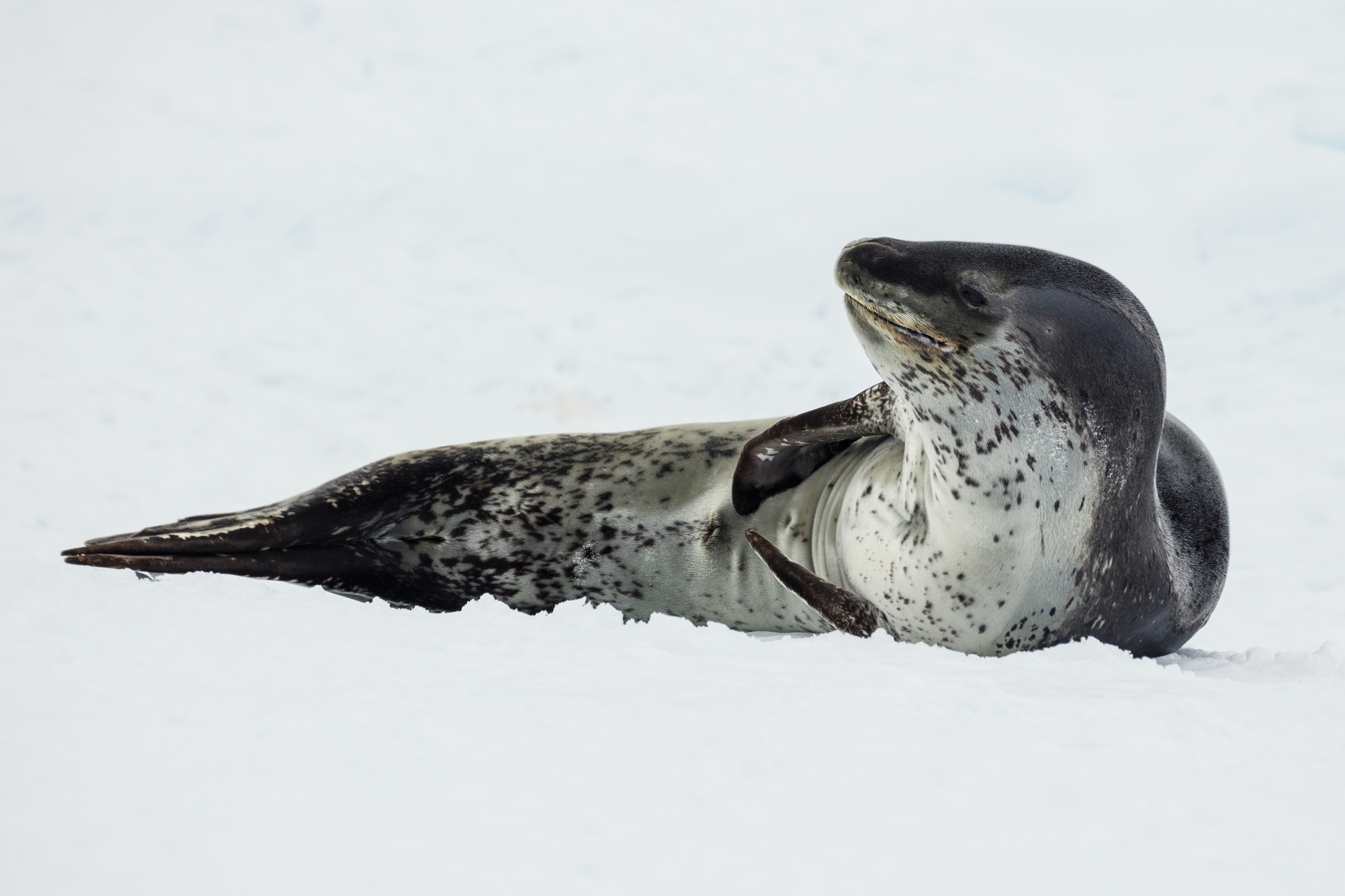

Conservation status
- Least Concern (IUCN 3.1)

Scientific classification
- Kingdom: Animalia
- Phylum: Chordata
- Class: Mammalia
- Order: Carnivora
- Parvorder: Pinnipedia
- Family: Phocidae
- Subfamily: Monachinae
- Tribe: Lobodontini
- Genus: Hydrurga; Gistel, 1848
- Species: H. leptonyx

Binomial name
- Hydrurga leptonyx (Blainville, 1820)
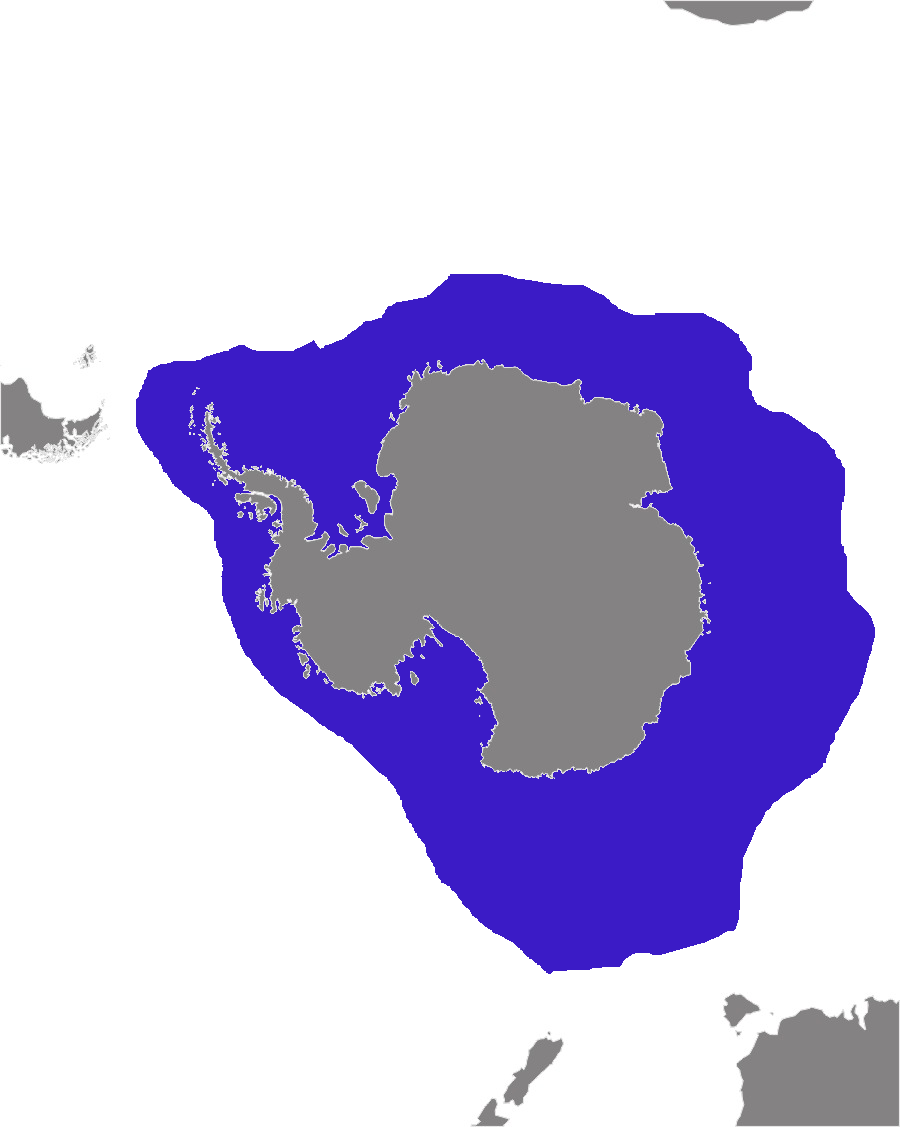
- Hydrurga leptonyx range map

Synonyms
- List: Phoca leptonyx de Blainville, 1820; Stenorhynchus leptonyx (Lesson, 1827); Phoca Homei (Lesson, 1828); Phoca leptonix (McMurtrie, 1831); Stenorhincus Leptonyx (C. H. Smith, 1842); Stenorynchus leptonyx (Lesson, 1842); Ogmorhinus leptonyx (J. A. Allen, 1880); Hydrurga leptonyx (J. A. Allen, 1905); Hydrurga leptonyz (Wozencraft, 2005)

= Leopard seal =

Leopard seal Temporal range: 5–0 Ma Early Pliocene – Recent

Macropredatory species of Antarctic seal

The leopard seal (Hydrurga leptonyx), also referred to as the sea leopard, is a long and muscular seal native to the Southern Ocean of Antarctica and southern Patagonia. It is the second largest species of seal in the Antarctic (after the southern elephant seal). It is the same length as, but half the weight of, a walrus. Its fur coat is countershaded, being silver on the bottom and dark gray on the top, and is distinctive for its leopard-like pattern of dark spots.

The leopard seal is an apex predator, with massive jaws, and teeth which are 2.5 cm (1 in) long. It feeds on a wide range of prey including its fellow pinnipeds, cephalopods, krill, fish, and birds, particularly penguins. Its only natural predator is the orca. It uses its hearing and whiskers to track prey underwater.

It is the only species in the genus Hydrurga. Its closest relatives are the Ross seal, the crabeater seal, and the Weddell seal, which are all Antarctic seals of the tribe Lobodontini.

== Research history and taxonomy ==
Henri Marie Ducrotay de Blainville, a French zoologist, described the leopard seal in 1820 from a stuffed specimen from the collection of one M. Hauville, in Le Havre. The skin that produced this work of taxidermy was sourced from "the southern seas", (Note: des mer du sud) that he ascertained to be from around the Falkland Islands. (Note: des environs des îles Falckland ou Malouines.) Blainville describes the specimen as "beautiful", 7-8 pieds long (7–8 ft (2.1–2.4 meters) long) and elongated, the form and features of the head resembling the "phoque moine" or monk seal, with a small number of whiskers short and simple in shape. Blainville was not able to find the ear opening. The "anterior" limbs are falciform, consisting of five fingers which decrease in size from the first to the fifth, tipped with very small claws, with that of the thumb not being "terminal". (Note: ...et cinq ongles assez petits, quoique bien évidens; celui du pouce n'est pas terminal) The hindlimbs are very distal (far back (Note: très-reculés)) and close to the short tail; these also consist of five digits, though in contrast to the forelimb, the middle toe is the shortest, with the rear flippers forming a "swallowtail". (Note: dont les extrêmes sont les plus longs) The skin he examined was described as yellow-white with a brownish dorsum; this is evidently a result of the skin discoloring, as taxidermies degrade over time. He thought that this new species, Phoca leptonyx, (Note: lepto- + onyx; "thin-clawed") must correspond to the animal that "navigators of austral seas" named the "sea calf".

Blainville found it comparable to a specimen he refers to as the "third skull" he examined and described in the same work, possessing the same number and shape of the incisors. (Note: le nombre et la forme des incisives sont en effet absolument le mêmes) This skull, unlabeled and thus of unknown locality, was noted as fresher and more bleached than the second skull he examined, being 10-12 pouces long. At first glance, he found that the skull had significant resemblance to the skull of the "phoque commun" or common seal, moreso than the previous two; though this skull was of bigger dimensions, was not as flattened nor narrowed post-orbitally, (Note: ...par moins d'aplatissement du crâne proprement dit, un moindre rétrécissement post-orbitaire) and notably had a well developed sagittal crest and enlarged nasal fossae. (Note: This passage was followed by;...ce qu'indique une énorme épaisseur inter-orbitaire, er par celle de leurs ouvertures antérieure et postérieure.) The robust molars of this skull possesses two roots and three cusps, pointed and prominent with the central cusp being the tallest. Five molars were present on each side of the jawbone, after the robust canines, (Note: les canines ne diffèrent guère aussi de celles du veau marin que par beaucoup plus de force) and the two incisors, the outer pair of incisors resembling the shape of the canines.

The genus Hydrurga (Note: hydro + ergon; "water worker") was erected by Johannes von Nepomuk Franz Xaver Gistel in 1848.

== Description ==
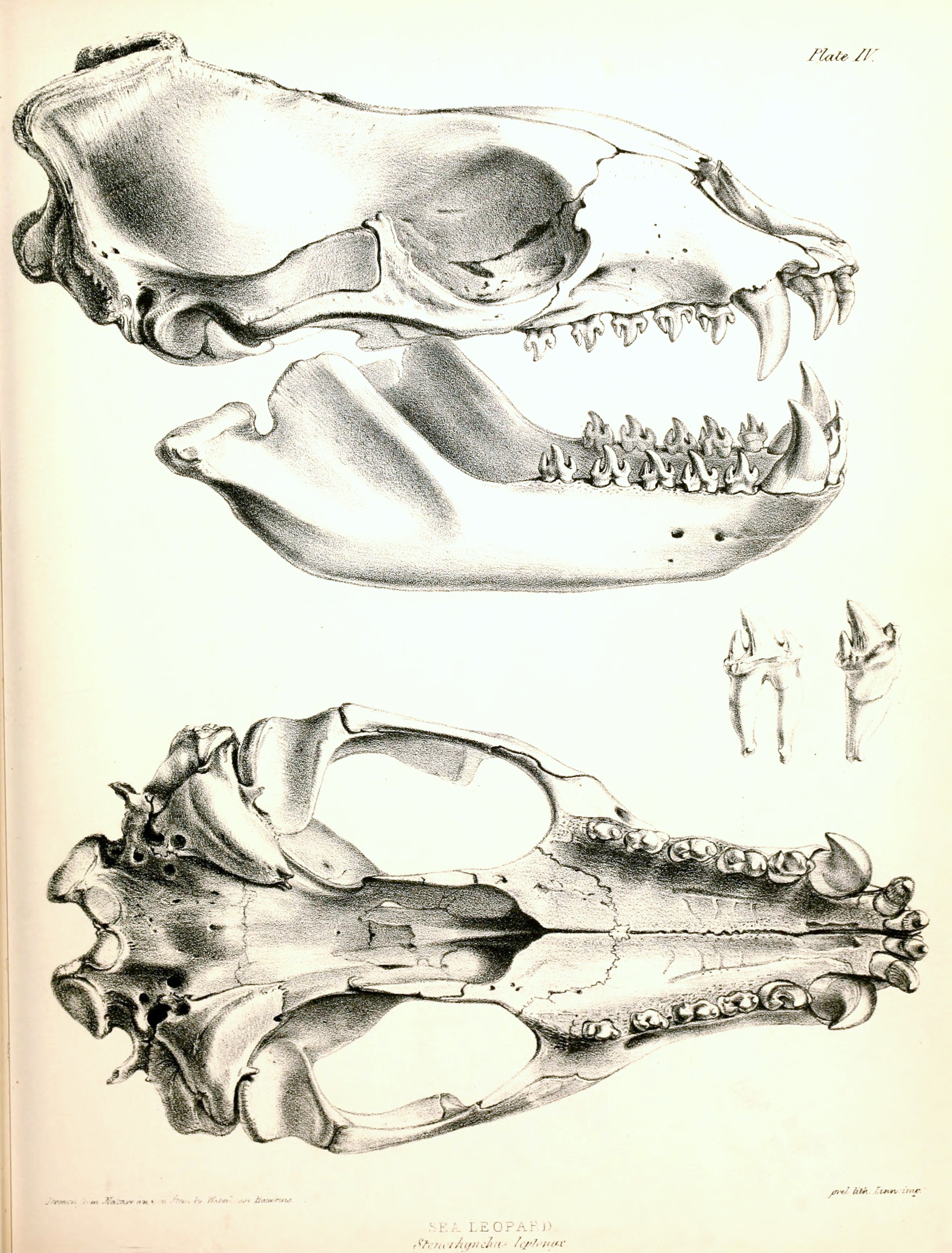
The skull of the leopard seal

The leopard seal has a distinctively long and muscular body shape when compared to other seals. The overall length of adults is 2.4–3.5 m (7.9–11.5 ft) and their weight is in the range 200 to 600 kilograms (440 to 1,320 lb), making them the same length as the northern walrus but usually less than half the weight. They are covered in a thick layer of blubber that helps to keep them warm while in the cold temperatures of the Antarctic. This blubber also helps to streamline their body making them more hydrodynamic, and thus able to hunt down swift prey. A seal's body condition can be ascertained through blubber thickness, along with general girth, weight, and length measurements.

The leopard seal is sexually dimorphic, with females being up to 50% larger. In the wild, leopard seals can live up to 26 years.

It is perhaps best known for its massive jaws, which allow it to be one of the top predators in its environment. The seal's canine teeth are up to 2.5 cm (1 in) long. These and the incisor teeth are sharp like those of other carnivores, but their molars lock together in a way that allows them to "sieve" krill from the water. This characteristic is shared with the other species in the tribe Lobodontini such as the crabeater seal, and is the trait that gives the tribe its name.

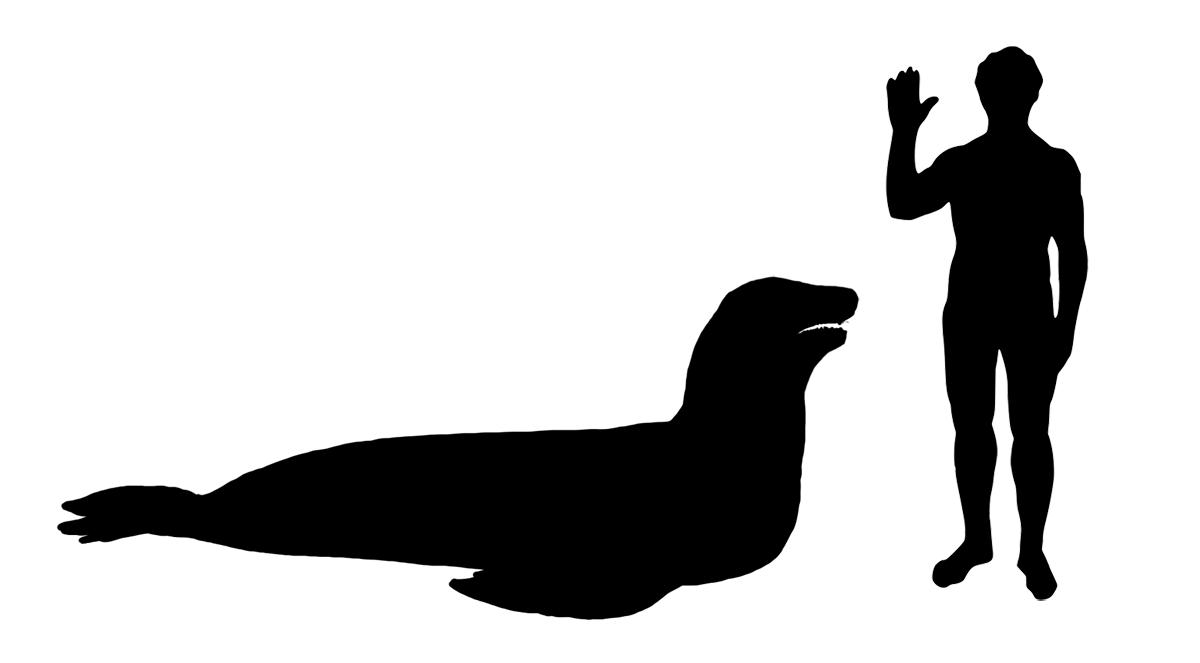
Size compared to a human

As "true" seals of the family Phocidae, they do not have external ears or pinnae, but possess an internal ear canal that leads to an external opening. Their hearing in air is similar to that of a human, but scientists have noted that leopard seals use their ears in conjunction with their whiskers to track prey under water. The whiskers are short and clear.

Their front flippers are extremely large in comparison to other phocids. Their large front flippers are used to steer themselves through the water column making them extremely agile while hunting. They use their front flippers similarly to sea lions (family Otariidae)

The pelage is counter-shaded; consisting mainly of a blend of silver and dark-gray, with a distinctive spotted leopard-like pattern on the dorsum, and a white to light gray color ventrally.

== Distribution ==
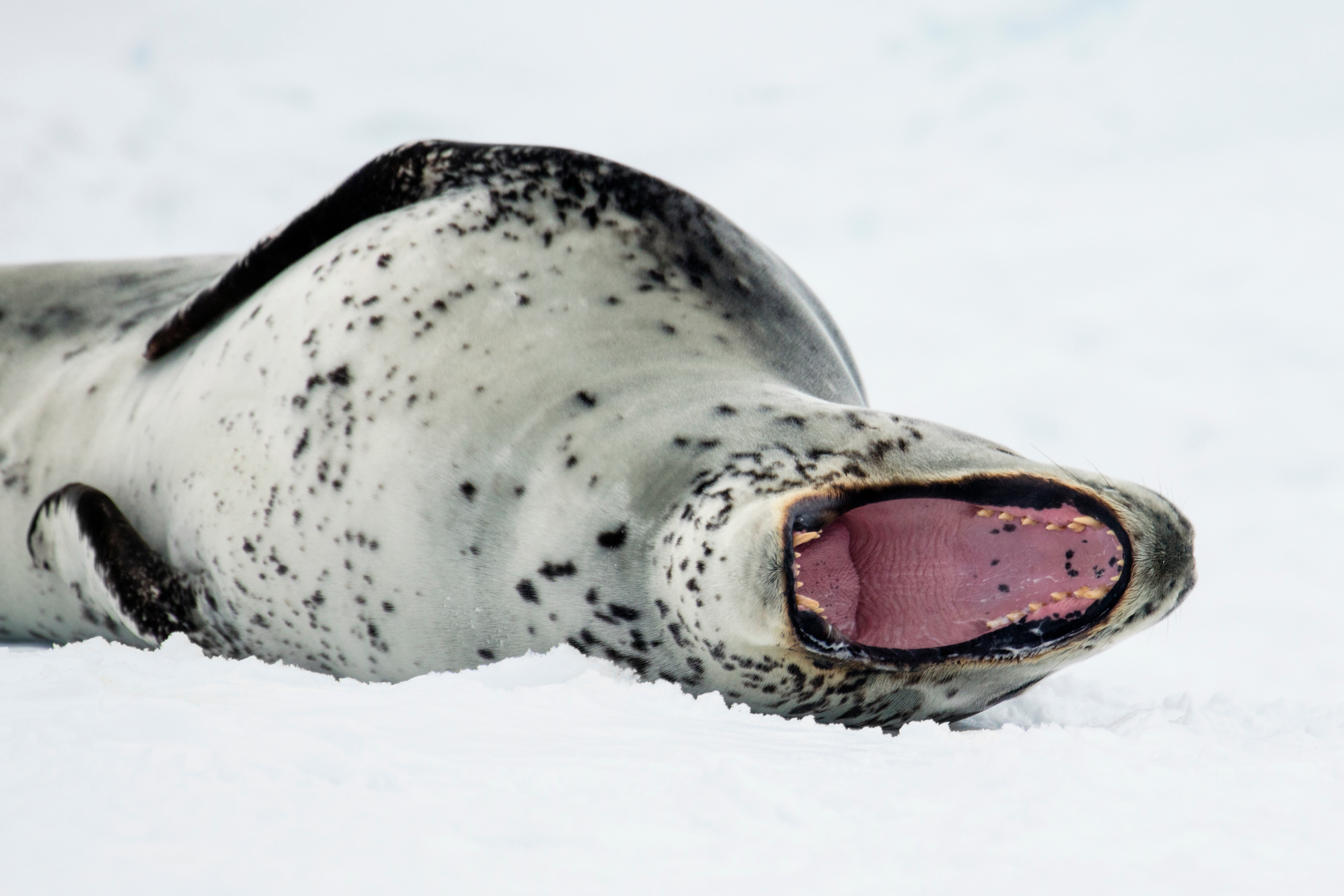
A leopard seal displaying its teeth

A leopard seal on Petone Beach, New Zealand

Leopard seals are pagophilic ("ice-loving") seals, which primarily inhabit the Antarctic pack ice between 50˚S and 80˚S. Leopard seals are seen in higher densities in West Antarctica than in other regions. A population appears to be resident in Chilean Patagonia, with reproduction being recorded in the region. Leopard seals are also considered by some to be resident species of New Zealand, with reproduction being recorded and individuals being present year-round in all regions of the country.

Most leopard seals remain within the pack ice throughout the year and remain solitary during most of their lives with the exception of a mother and her newborn pup. These matrilineal groups can move further north in the austral winter to sub-antarctic islands and the coastlines of the southern continents to provide care for their pups. While solitary animals may appear in areas of lower latitudes, females rarely breed there. Some researchers believe this is due to safety concerns for the pups.

The estimated population of this species ranges from 220,000 to 440,000 individuals, putting leopard seals at "Least Concern". Although there is an abundance of leopard seals in the Antarctic, they are difficult to survey by traditional audiovisual techniques as they spend long periods of time vocalizing under the water's surface during the austral spring and summer, when audiovisual surveys are carried out. This habit of submarine vocalizing makes leopard seals naturally suited for acoustic surveys, as are conducted with cetaceans, allowing researchers to gather most of what is known about them.

Sightings of vagrant leopard seals have been recorded on the coasts of Australia, Argentina, Brazil, Uruguay, South Africa, Pitcairn Islands, Easter Island, French Polynesia, and Tristan da Cunha. The northernmost sighting of a leopard seal was in the Cook Islands in 1960. Fossil evidence suggests that leopard seals were also present in South Africa during the Late Pleistocene.

== Behavior ==
Swimming leopard seal

Using data received from transmitters called satellite-linked depth recorders (SLDRs) and time-depth recorders (TDRs), which are attached to the seals' heads by scientists, it was determined that leopard seals are primarily shallow divers, but capable of diving deeper than 80 metres (260 ft) in search for food. They are able to complete these dives by collapsing their lungs and re-inflating them at the surface. This is possible by increasing the amount of surfactants which coats the alveoli in the lungs for re-inflation. They also have a reinforced trachea to prevent collapse at great depth pressures.

These seals feed on a wide variety of creatures; young leopard seals usually eat mostly krill, squid, and fish. Adults are able to take on more difficult but substantial prey, famously including emperor, king, rockhopper, Adélie, gentoo, and chinstrap penguins, though they also prey on other seal species such as Weddell, crabeater, Ross, young southern elephant seals, and fur seal pups.

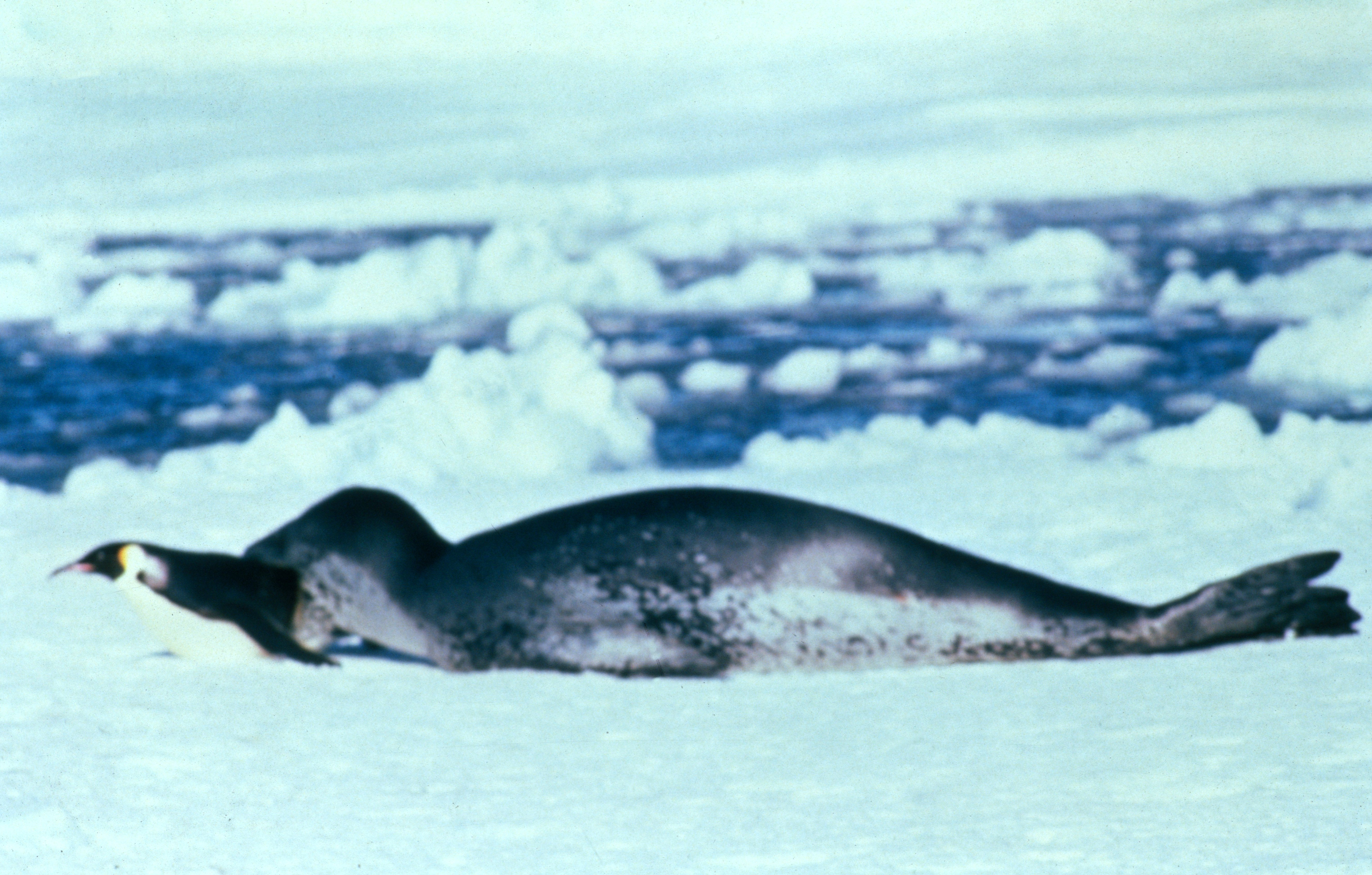
Attacking an emperor penguin

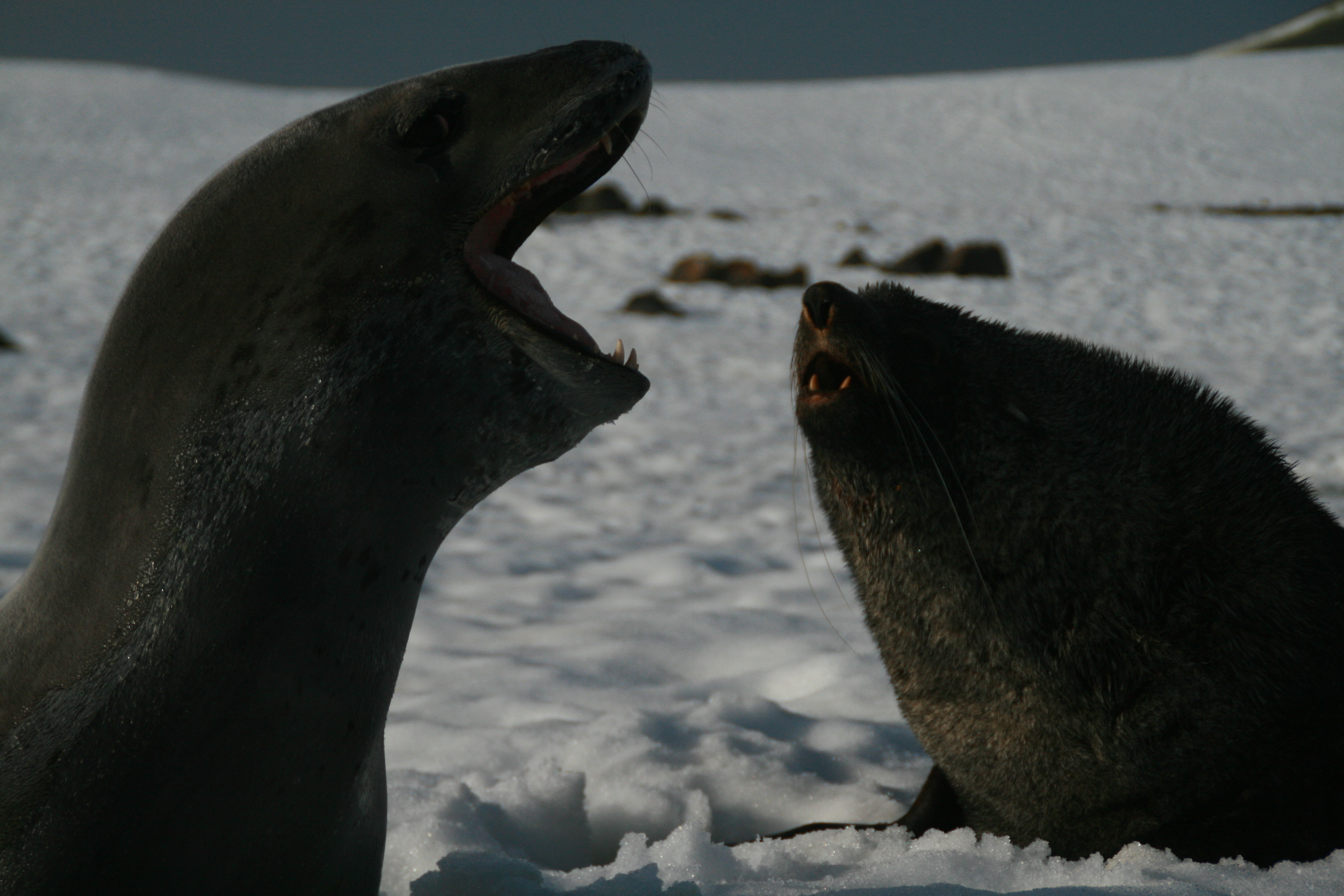
Leopard seal with a male Antarctic fur seal (right) on the shores of Livingston Island. Juvenile fur seals may be preyed upon by leopard seals.

Research shows that on average, the aerobic dive-limit for juvenile seals is around 7 minutes, which means that during the winter months juvenile leopard seals do not eat krill, which is a major part of older seals' diets, since krill is found deeper during this time. This might occasionally lead to co-operative hunting. Co-operative hunting of leopard seals on Antarctic fur seal pups has been witnessed, which could be a mother helping her older pup, or could also be female-male couple-interactions, to increase their hunting-productivity.

Around the sub-Antarctic island of South Georgia, the Antarctic fur seal (Arctocephalus gazella) is the main prey. Antarctic krill (Euphasia superba), southern elephant seal pups and petrels such as the diving petrel (Pelecanoides) and the cape petrel (Daption) have also been taken as prey. Vagrant leopard seals in New Zealand have been observed preying on chondrichthyans: elephantfish (Callorhinchus milii), ghost sharks, and spiny dogfish were recorded as prey items. Additionally, this population of leopard seals and those in Australia were noted to bear wounds from chimaeriforms and stingrays respectively.

When hunting penguins, the leopard seal patrols the waters near the edges of the ice, almost completely submerged while waiting for the birds to enter the ocean. It kills the swimming bird by grabbing the feet, then shaking the penguin vigorously and beating its body against the surface of the water repeatedly until the penguin is dead. Previous reports stating that the leopard seal skins its prey before feeding have been found to be incorrect. Lacking the teeth necessary to slice its prey into manageable pieces, it flails its prey from side to side tearing and ripping it into smaller pieces.

Krill is eaten by suction, and strained through the seal's teeth, allowing leopard seals to switch to different feeding styles. Such generalization and adaptations may be responsible for the seal's success in the challenging Antarctic ecosystem.

The only natural predator of leopard seals is the orca.

=== Acoustic behavior ===
In Lemaire Island, Antarctica

Leopard seals are very vocal underwater during the austral summer. The male seals produce loud calls (153 to 177 dB 1 μPa at 1 m) for many hours each day. While singing the seal hangs upside down and rocks from side to side under the water. Their back is bent, the neck and cranial thoracic region (the chest) is inflated and as they call their chest pulses. The male calls can be split into two categories: vocalizing and silencing; vocalizing is when they are making noises underwater, and silencing noted as the breathing period at the air surface. Adult male leopard seals have only a few stylized calls, some are like bird or cricket-like trills yet others are low haunting moans. Scientists have identified five distinctive sounds that male leopard seals make, which include: the high double trill, medium single trill, low descending trill, low double trill, and a hoot with a single low trill. These cadences of calls are believed to be a part of a long range acoustic display for territorial purposes, or to attract a potential mate.

The leopard seals have age-related differences in their calling patterns, just like birds. The younger male seals have many different types of variable calls, but the mature male seals have only a few, highly stylized calls. Each male leopard seal produces these individual calls, and can arrange their few call types into individually distinctive sequences (or songs). The acoustic behavior of the leopard seal is believed to be linked to their breeding behaviour. In male seals, vocalizing coincides with the timing of their breeding season, which falls between November and the first week of January; captive female seals vocalize when they have elevated reproductive hormones. Conversely, a female leopard seal can attribute calls to their environment as well; however, usually it is to gain the attention of a pup, after getting back from a forage for food.

=== Breeding-habits ===
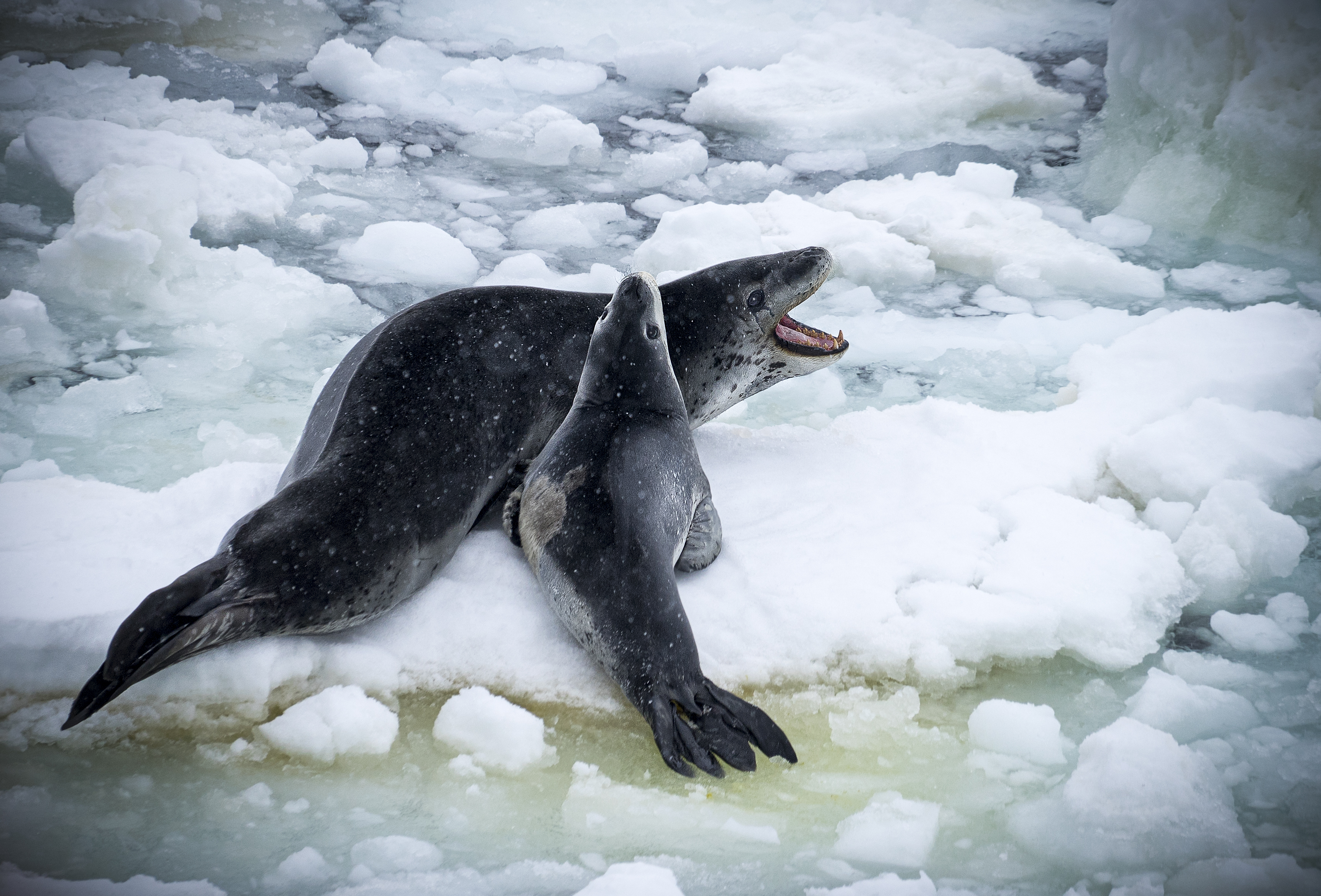
A mother leopard seal with her pup

Vocalization is thought to be important in breeding, since males are much more vocal around this time. Mating takes place in the water, and then the male leaves the female to care for the pup, which the female gives birth to after an average gestation period of 274 days. Most leopard seal breeding take place on a pack of ice.

Since leopard seals live in an area difficult for humans to survive in, not much is known on their reproduction and breeding habits. However, it is known that their breeding system is polygynous, meaning that males mate with multiple females during the mating period. Females reach sexual maturity between the ages of three and seven, and can give birth to a single pup during the summer on the floating ice floes of the Antarctic pack ice; males reach sexual maturity around the age of six or seven years. Mating occurs from December to January, shortly after the pups are weaned when the female seal is in estrus. In preparation for the pups, the females dig a circular hole in the ice as a home for the pup. A newborn pup weighs around 30 kg (66 lb) and are usually with their mother for a month, before they are weaned off. The male leopard seal does not participate in childcare, and returns to its solitary lifestyle after the breeding season. Leopard seal pup mortality within the first year is close to 25%.

Five research voyages were made to Antarctica in 1985, 1987 and 1997–1999 to survey leopard seals. They sighted seal pups from the beginning of November to the end of December, and noticed that there was about one pup for every three adults, and they also noticed that most of the adults were staying away from other adults during this season, and when they were seen in groups they showed no sign of interaction.

== Relationships with humans ==
Leopard seals are large predators presenting a potential risk to humans. However, attacks on humans are rare. Most human perceptions of leopard seals are shaped by historic encounters between humans and leopard seals that occurred during the early days of Antarctic exploration. Examples of aggressive behavior, stalking, and attacks are rare, but have been documented. A large leopard seal attacked Thomas Orde-Lees (1877–1958), a member of Sir Ernest Shackleton's Imperial Trans-Antarctic Expedition of 1914–1917, when the expedition was camping on the sea-ice. The "sea-leopard", about 12 ft (3.7 m) long and 1,100 lb (500 kg), chased Orde-Lees on the ice. He was saved only when another member of the expedition, Frank Wild, shot it.

In 1985, Canadian-British explorer Gareth Wood was bitten twice on the leg when a leopard seal tried to drag him off the ice and into the sea. His companions managed to save him by repeatedly kicking the animal in the head with the spiked crampons on their boots. On 26 September 2021, near the dive-site Spaniard Rock at Simon's Town, South Africa, three spear-fishermen encountered a leopard seal while spearing approximately 400 m (1,300 ft) offshore. The seal attacked them and, while they were swimming back to shore, disarmed them of their flippers and spearguns and kept harassing the men over the course of half an hour, inflicting multiple bite- and puncture-wounds. Leopard seals have shown a predilection for attacking the black, torpedo-shaped pontoons of rigid inflatable boats, leading researchers to equip their craft with special protective guards to prevent them from being punctured.

On the other hand, National Geographic magazine photographer Paul Nicklen captured pictures of a female leopard seal bringing live, injured, and then dead penguins to him, possibly in an attempt to "nurture" the photographer; the seal apparently continued to provide penguins for Nicklen for four days.

=== Death of Kirsty Brown ===
In 2003, biologist Kirsty Brown of the British Antarctic Survey was killed by a leopard seal while conducting research snorkeling in Antarctica. This was the first recorded human fatality attributed to a leopard seal. Brown was part of a team of four researchers taking part in an underwater survey at South Cove, near the U.K.'s Rothera Research Station. Brown and another researcher, Richard Burt, were snorkeling in the water. Burt was snorkeling at a distance of 15 meters (nearly 50 feet) from Brown when the team heard a scream and saw Brown disappear deeper into the water. She was rescued by her team, but they were unable to resuscitate her. It was later revealed that the seal had held Brown underwater for around six minutes at a depth of up to 70 meters (230 ft), drowning her. Furthermore, she suffered a total of 45 separate injuries (bites and scratches), most of which were concentrated around her head and neck.

In a report read at the inquiry into Brown's death, Professor Ian Boyd from the University of St Andrews stated that the seal may have mistaken her for a fur seal, or been frightened by her presence and attacked in defense; Professor Boyd said that leopard-seal-attacks on humans were extremely rare, but warned that they may potentially become more common due to increased human presence in Antarctica. The coroner recorded the cause of death as "accidental" and "caused by drowning due to a leopard-seal-attack".

=== Captivity ===
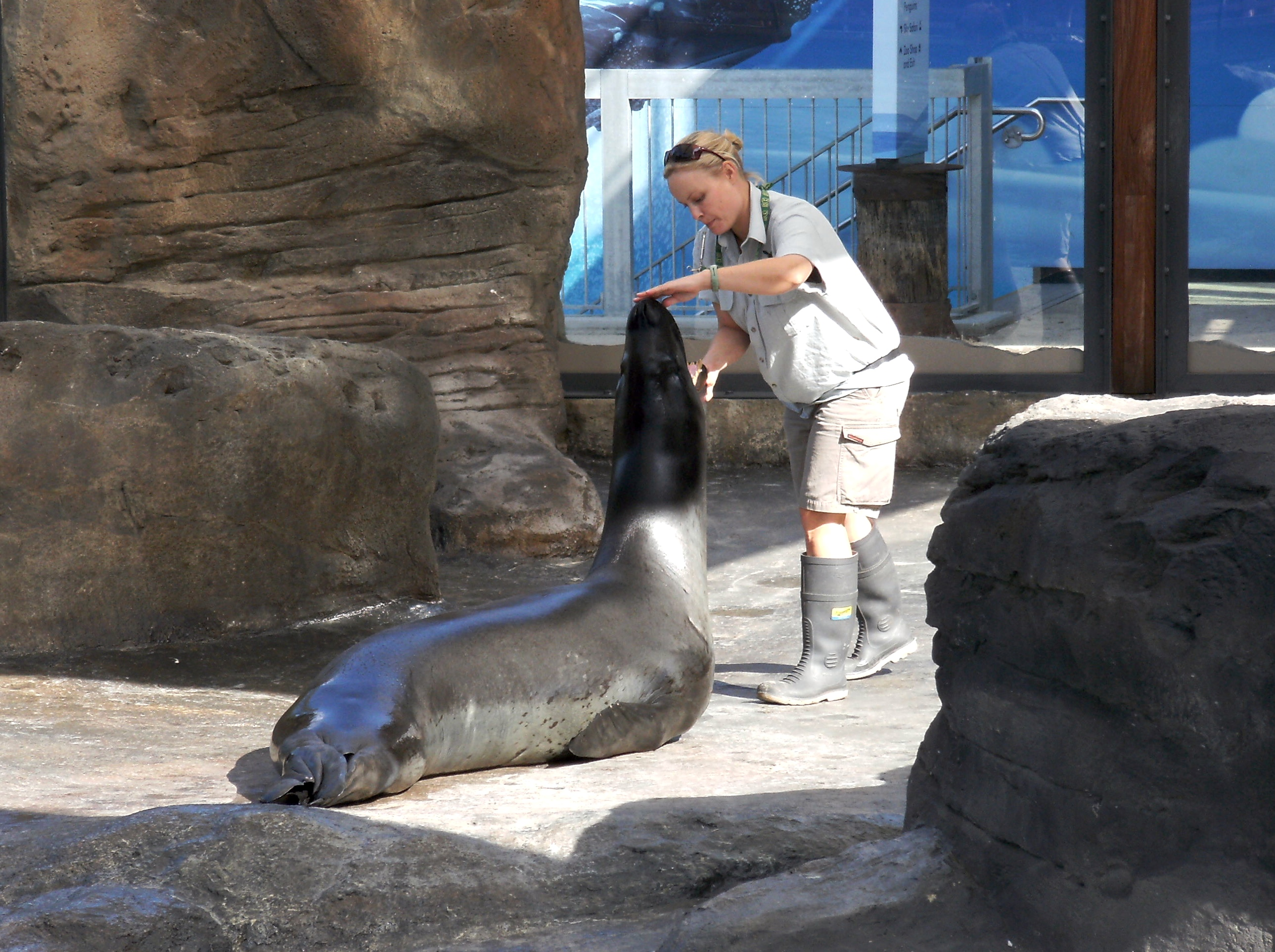
Captive leopard seal, Taronga Zoo

The Taronga Zoo kept rescued leopard seals from 1999 to 2014. These seals were thought to be vagrants, washing up on Australian beaches emaciated and bearing bites from cookiecutter sharks. After being nursed back to health, they were not released back into the wild as it was feared that they would transmit diseases to the wild population of leopard seals, so they remained in the care of the zoo until their deaths. In order from date of rescue, they were named Brooke, Sabine, and Casey.

=== Owha ===
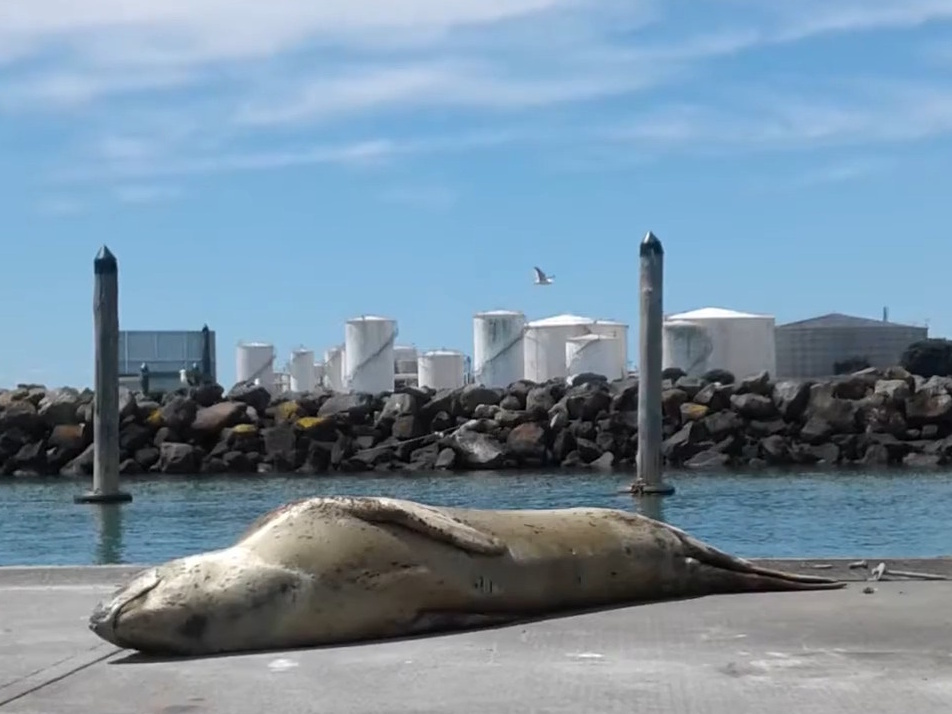
Owha resting, Hauraki Gulf 2016

Owha (full name: He owha nā ōku tūpuna) is a female leopard seal that remained around the coastline of the North Island of New Zealand from 2012 to at least May 2022, recognized by scars on her cheek and flank. She is claimed to be the longest-tracked leopard seal in the world.

=== Conservation ===
The International Union for Conservation of Nature (IUCN) lists the leopard seal as Least Concern. The species is widespread and abundant throughout its range, facing no major threats from human activity. The trend in population size is unknown, with no indication of decline. A 2012 survey estimated the total population size to be 35,000; the IUCN notes this is likely a substantial underestimate.

Because they are limited to a subpolar distribution in the Antarctic, they may be at risk as polar ice caps diminish with global warming. Additional threats include the commercial harvesting of krill, increased tourism activity, entanglement in marine debris, and canine distemper virus. Seals within New Zealand waters are protected by the Marine Mammals Protection Act. Hunting of leopard seals is regulated by the Convention for the Conservation of Antarctic Seals (CCAS); no hunting currently occurs.

== General references ==
- Rogers, Tracey L. (2009). "The leopard seal, Hydrurga leptonyx". In Perrin, W. F.; Würsig, B.; Thewissen, J. G. M. (eds.). Encyclopedia of Marine Mammals (2nd ed.). Academic Press. ISBN 978-0-12-373553-9.
- Heacox, Kim. (2006). Deadly Beauty. National Geographic, November 2006
- Saundry, Peter. (2010) Leopard Seal. Encyclopedia of Earth. Topic ed. C. Michael Hogan, editor-in-chief Cutler Cleveland, NCSE, Washington DC
