= East of Nelly Point Important Bird Area =

Tract of land in Antarctica

Coordinates: 61°09′S 54°45′W

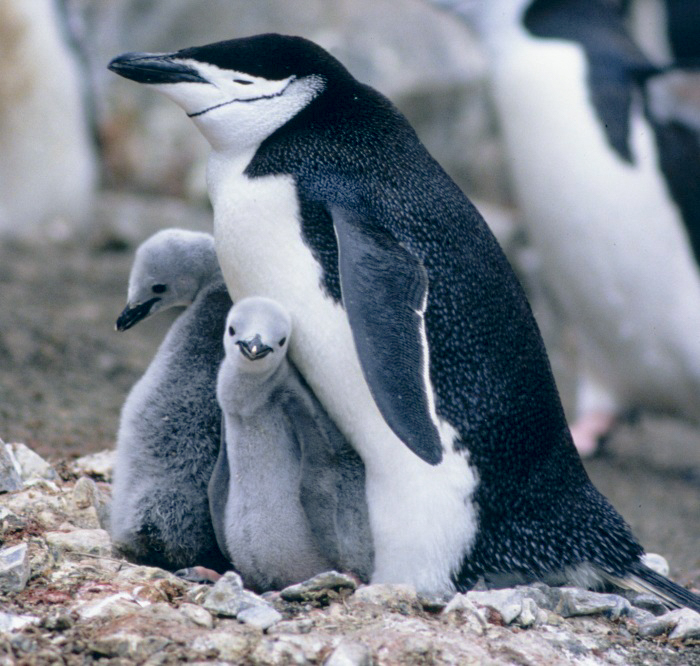
The IBA is an important breeding site for chinstrap penguins

East of Nelly Point Important Bird Area is a 35 ha, ice-free tract of land on the south-eastern coast of Elephant Island, in the South Shetland Islands of Antarctica. It is a small, unnamed headland, some 2.5 km east of Nelly Point, which has been referred to unofficially as Chinstrap Camp. The site has been identified as an Important Bird Area (IBA) by BirdLife International because it supports a large breeding colony of about 24,000 pairs of chinstrap penguins.
