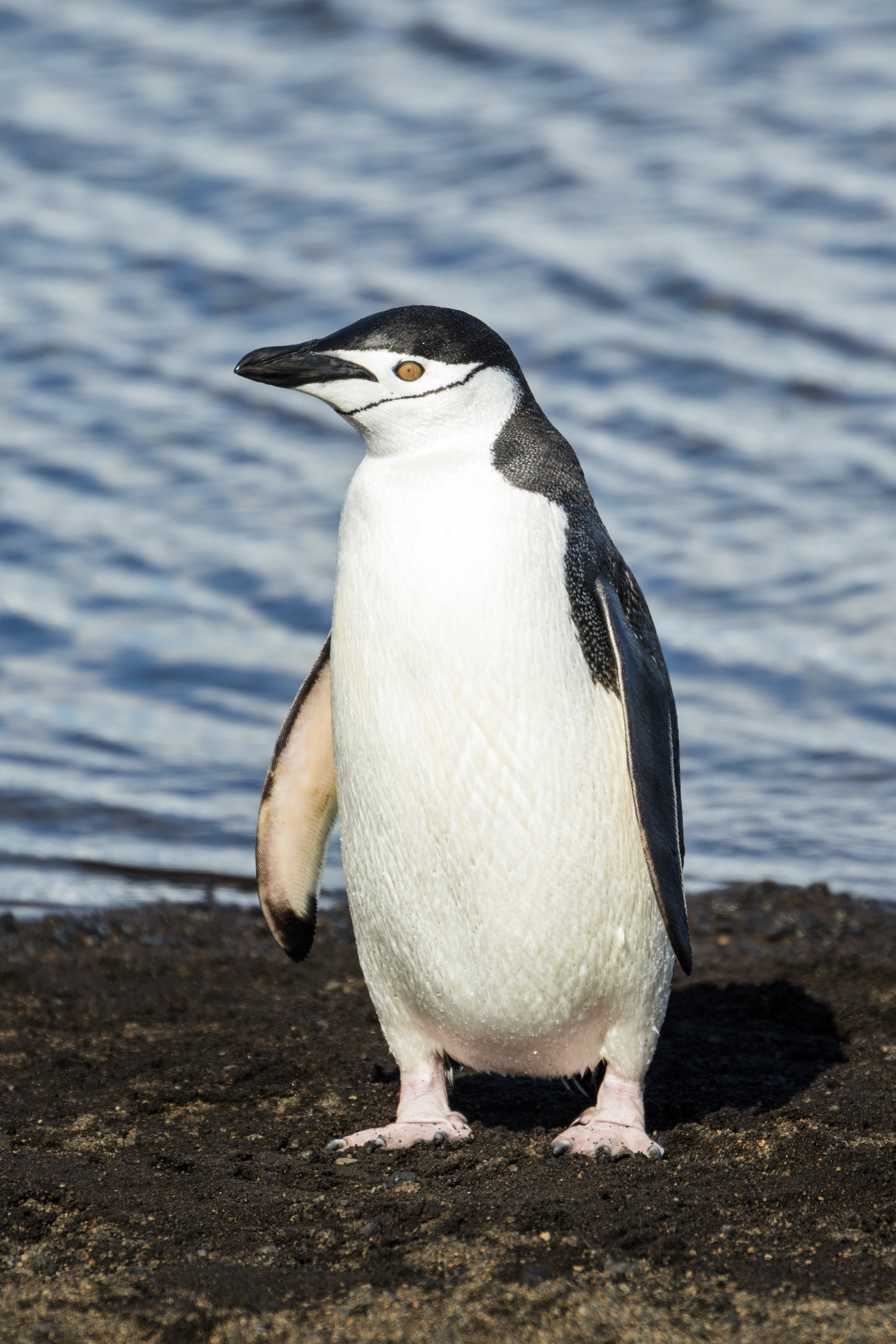
- Deception Island, South Shetland Islands

Conservation status
- Least Concern (IUCN 3.1)

Scientific classification
- Kingdom: Animalia
- Phylum: Chordata
- Class: Aves
- Order: Sphenisciformes
- Family: Spheniscidae
- Genus: Pygoscelis
- Species: P. antarcticus

Binomial name
- Pygoscelis antarcticus (Forster, 1781)

Synonyms
- Aptenodytes antarctica Forster, 1781; Pygoscelis antarctica Turbott, 1990

= Chinstrap penguin =

Chinstrap penguin Temporal range: Miocene to recent

Species of penguin

The chinstrap penguin (Pygoscelis antarcticus) is a penguin species that inhabits various islands and shores in the Southern Pacific and the Antarctic Oceans. Its name stems from the narrow black band under its head, which makes it appear to wear a black helmet. Other common names include ringed penguin, bearded penguin, and stonecracker penguin. It is known for its loud, harsh call.

== Taxonomy ==
This species was initially given the scientific name Aptenodytes antarctica by Johann Reinhold Forster in 1781, placing it in the same genus as the king and emperor penguins. In 1990, Graham Turbott transferred this species into the genus Pygoscelis, together with the Adélie and gentoo penguins. This gave it the new name P. antarctica. However, this is an orthographic error due to the disagreement in Latin grammar between Antarctica and its assigned genus. The corrected form, P. antarcticus, is the currently accepted name for this species.

== Description ==
Video showing various behaviours, Antarctica

The chinstrap penguin grows to a length of 68–76 cm (27–30 in) and a weight of 3.2–5.3 kg (7.1–11.7 lb), varying with the time of year. Males are greater in weight and height than females.

The adult chinstrap's flippers are black with a white edge; the inner sides are white. The face is white, extending behind the eyes, which are reddish brown; the chin and throat are white, as well, while the short bill is black. The strong legs and the webbed feet are pink. Its short, stumpy legs give it a distinct waddle when it walks. The chinstrap penguin's black back and white underside provide camouflage in the form of countershading when viewed from above or below, helping to avoid detection by its predators.

== Distribution ==
Chinstrap penguins have a circumpolar distribution. They breed in Antarctica, Argentina, Bouvet Island, Chile, the French Southern Territories, and South Georgia and the South Sandwich Islands. Vagrant individuals have been found in New Zealand, Saint Helena, Tristan da Cunha, and South Africa.

== Ecology ==
The diet of the chinstrap penguin consists of small fish, krill, shrimp, and squid, which they swim up to 80 km (50 mi) offshore each day to obtain. The chinstrap penguin's tightly packed feathers provide a waterproof coat, enabling it to swim in freezing waters. Additionally, thick blubber deposits and intricate blood vessels in the flippers and legs help retain heat.

The main predator of the chinstrap penguin at sea is the leopard seal (Hydrurga leptonyx). Every year, the leopard seal causes the chinstrap's population to decrease by about 5-20%. On land, the brown skua (Stercorarius antarcticus), south polar skua (Stercorarius maccormicki), and southern giant petrel (Macronectes giganteus) are the primary predators of the penguin, most often preying on eggs and young. The Antarctic fur seal is also known to kill chinstrap penguins occasionally.

== Behaviour ==
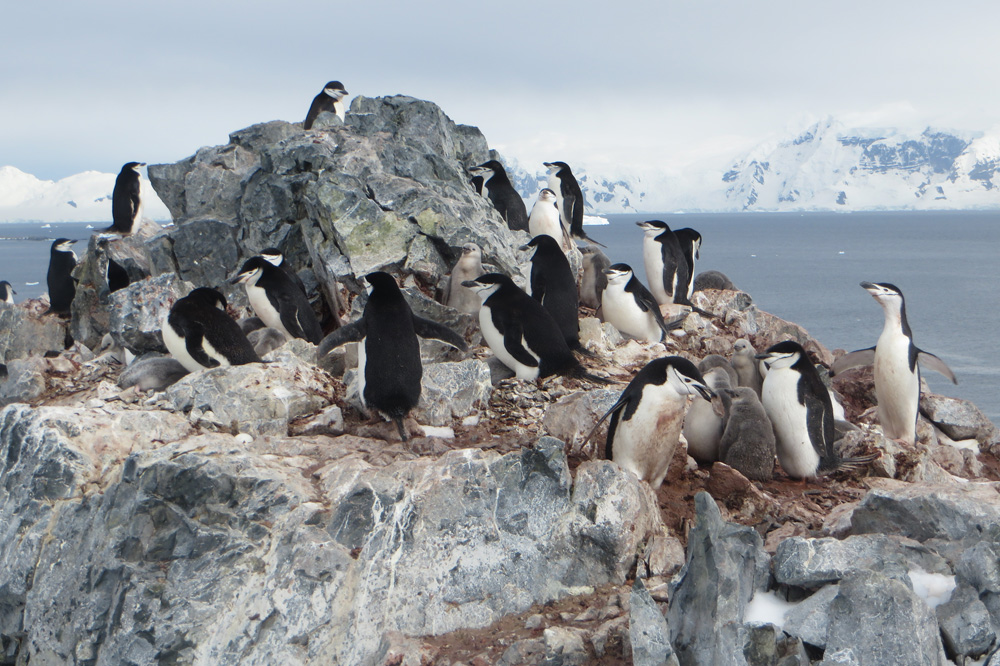
Chinstrap penguin colony near Orne Harbor, Antarctic Peninsula

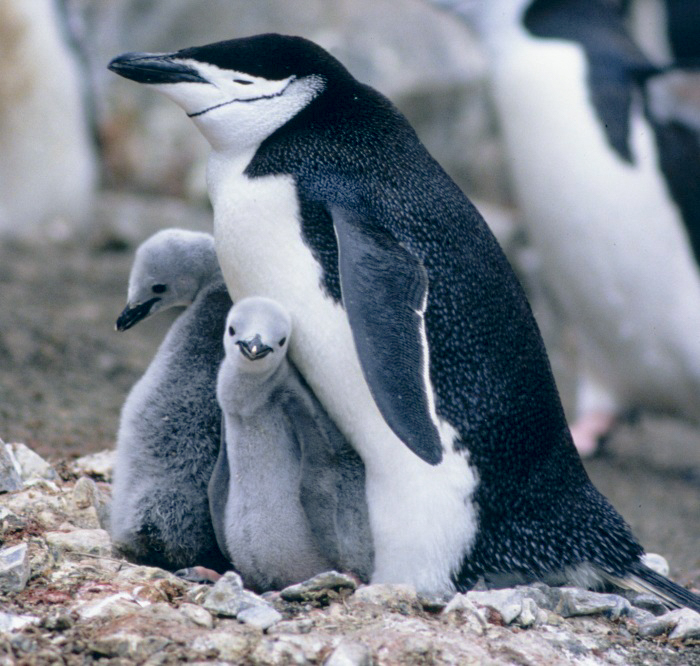
Adult with juveniles

On land, they build circular nests from stones and lay two eggs, which are incubated by the male and the female for shifts of around 6 days each. The chicks hatch after around 37 days, and have fluffy grey backs and white fronts. The chicks stay in the nest for 20–30 days before joining other chicks in a crèche. Around 50–60 days old, they molt, gaining their adult feathers, and go to sea.

Chinstrap penguins are generally considered the most aggressive and ill-tempered species of penguin, often attacking anything approaching its nesting grounds that is not a Chinstrap penguin, including predators, humans, and other species of penguin like Adélie penguins.

Chinstrap penguins microsleep over 10,000 times a day and accomplish this in 4-second bouts of sleep. Sleep can be both bihemispheric and unihemispheric slow-wave sleep. The penguins accumulate about 11 hours of sleep per hemisphere each day.

=== Roy and Silo ===
In 2004, two male chinstrap penguins named Roy and Silo in Central Park Zoo, New York City, formed a pair bond and took turns trying to "hatch" a rock, for which a keeper eventually substituted a fertile egg, and the pair subsequently hatched and raised the chick. Penguins, by nature, hatch eggs and are social creatures. The children's book And Tango Makes Three was written based on this event.

== Conservation status ==
In 2018, the IUCN estimated the chinstrap penguin population at around 8 million individuals. Although it is believed to be decreasing overall, its population is not severely fragmented; it is increasing or stable in many sites. The species is classified as least concern on the IUCN Red List as of 2016, due to its large range and population, following five previous assessments of the same status from 2004 to 2012 and three assessments as "unknown" from 1988 to 2000.

The chinstrap penguin is primarily threatened by climate change. In several parts of its range, climate change decreases the abundance of krill, which likely makes reproduction less successful. For instance, a 2019 expedition to breeding grounds on Elephant Island found a 50% population decline in just under 50 years. A 2026 study found a 63% decline in chinstrap penguin populations on Zavodovski Island, with the colony losing approximately 680,000 individuals. This decline was attributed primarily to climate-induced southwards contraction of krill populations. The study also suggested reclassifying the chinstrap penguin to endangered in light of the discovery.

Other potential threats include volcanic events and human fishing for krill.
