= Euphausia crystallorophias =

Scientific classification
- Kingdom: Animalia
- Phylum: Arthropoda
- Clade: Pancrustacea
- Class: Malacostraca
- Order: Euphausiacea
- Family: Euphausiidae
- Genus: Euphausia
- Species: E. crystallorophias

Binomial name
- Euphausia crystallorophias Holt & Tattersall, 1906

Species of krill

Euphausia crystallorophias is a species of krill, sometimes called ice krill, crystal krill, or Antarctic coastal krill. It lives in the coastal waters around Antarctica, further south than any other species of krill. The specimens for the species' original description were collected through holes cut in the ice by Robert Falcon Scott's Discovery Expedition, several thousand having been donated by Thomas Vere Hodgson.

== Description ==
Adults of E. crystallorophias are smaller than those of E. superba, reaching a length of 23–35 mm (0.91–1.38 in); they can be distinguished from young E. superba by the large size of the eyes, and by the long, sharply pointed rostrum.

== Distribution ==
E. crystallorophias is found around the coasts of Antarctica, replacing the more oceanic E. superba at latitudes above 74° south. It is usually found at depths down to 350–600 m (1,150–1,970 ft), but has occasionally been found as deep as 4,000 m (13,000 ft).

== Ecology ==
E. crystallorophias feeds on bacteria, diatoms, detritus, and other microorganisms, including the algae that form on the underside of sea ice, and is in turn an important food source for fish, whales, and penguins, especially minke whales, Weddell seals, Adelie penguins, and the Antarctic silverfish. This makes it arguably the most important link in the coastal Antarctic food chain between the primary producers and the macrofauna. Unlike most other krill species, the eggs of E. crystallorophias are neutrally buoyant, meaning they do not sink, and the hatchling larvae do not have to swim back to the more productive, shallower waters; however, since this means both life stages inhabit the same depths, how the larvae avoid being eaten by the adults is not known.
