= Orne (disambiguation) =

Orne is a department in France.

Orne may also refer to:

- Orne (surname), a list of people with the surname
- Orne (Normandy river), river in Normandy, northwestern France
- Orne (Moselle), river in Lorraine, northeastern France
- Orne Harbor, Antarctic Peninsula
- Orne Covered Bridge, Irasburg, Vermont, United States

== See also ==
- Mount Orne Covered Bridge, over the Connecticut River between New Hampshire and Vermont, United States
