= Krill fishery =

Industrial harvest of small open-ocean crustaceans

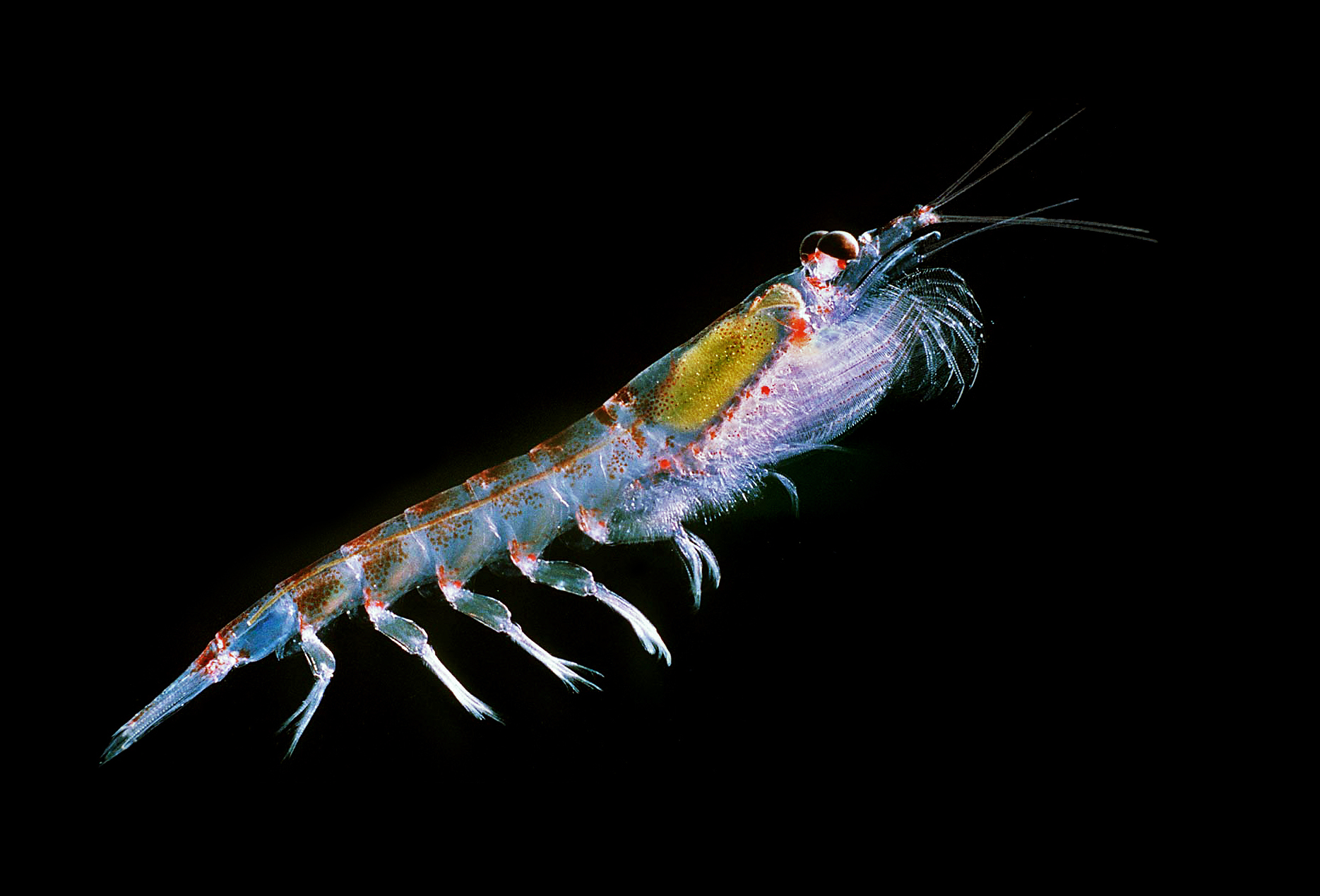
Antarctic krill (Euphausia superba)

The krill fishery is the commercial fishery of krill, small shrimp-like marine animals that live in the oceans world-wide. The present estimate for the biomass of Antarctic krill (Euphausia superba) is 379 million tonnes. The total global harvest of krill from all fisheries amounts to 150–200,000 tonnes annually, mainly Antarctic krill and North Pacific krill (E. pacifica).

Krill are rich in protein (40% or more of dry weight) and lipids (about 20% in E. superba). Their exoskeleton amounts to some 2% of dry weight of chitin. They also contain traces of a wide array of hydrolytic enzymes such as proteases, carbohydrases, nucleases and phospholipases, which are concentrated in the digestive gland in the cephalothorax of the krill.

Most krill is used as aquaculture feed and fish bait; other uses include livestock or pet foods. Only a small percentage is prepared for human consumption. Their enzymes are interesting for medical applications, an expanding sector since the early 1990s.

== Technology ==
Krill are small animals, considered a type of zooplankton, and hence need to be fished with fine-meshed plankton nets. Such nets pose several problems: they tend to clog fast, and they have high drag, producing a bow wave that deflects the krill to the sides. Trawling must hence be done at low speeds. Additionally, fine nets are delicate, and the first krill nets designed exploded while fishing through the krill schools. Furthermore, fine nets increase unwanted bycatch, such as fish fingerlings, which might have unforeseen side-effects on the ecosystem, even though large krill aggregations tend to be monospecific.

Another problem is bringing the krill catch on board. When the full net is hauled out of the water, the organisms compress each other, resulting in great loss of the krill's liquids. Experiments have been carried out to pump Antarctic krill, while still in water, from the cod end of the net through a large tube on board. This method had already been used by the small fishing boats in Japanese waters; it increases the capture capacity and the processing rate of krill.

One of the first Antarctic krill trawlers to use this technique was the FV Atlantic Navigator, registered in Vanuatu and owned by the Norwegian-based company Aker ASA, which used this technique in the 2003/04 and 2004/05 fishing seasons. In these seasons, this ship alone caught 25% and 38% of the whole krill catch in CCAMLR regions. The successor ship of the Atlantic Navigator, the FV Saga Sea, can fish up to about 120,000 tonnes of krill annually, (Note: This claim does not match the FAO and CCAMLR data at all; the Saga Sea would have caught all of the krill reported to have been caught by these agencies. Aker themselves give much more modest figures (which do match the FAO/CCAMLR data) in their 2007 quarterly reports. For the 2007/08 season, the Saga Sea has a catch limit of 80'000 tonnes.) and Aker announced plans to build more such ships - Antarctic Endurance launching early 2019.

Krill must be processed within one to three hours after capture due to the rapid enzymatic breakdown and the tainting of the meat by the intestines. They must be peeled because their exoskeleton contains fluorides, which are toxic in high concentrations.

== Products ==
Krill is a rich source of protein and omega-3 fatty acids which are utilised in dietary supplements as oil capsules, livestock food, and pet food. Most krill is processed to produce fish food for use in aquariums and aquacultures. The krill is sold freeze-dried, either whole or pulverized. Krill as a food source is known to have positive effects on some fish, such as stimulating appetite or resulting in an increased disease resistance. Furthermore, krill contains carotenoids and is thus used sometimes as a pigmentizing agent to color the skin and meat of some fish. About 34% of the Japanese catch of E. superba and 50% of E. pacifica are used for fish food; the Canadian catch is used almost exclusively for this purpose.

One quarter of the Japanese catch of E. superba is used in the form of fresh frozen krill as fish bait and half the E. pacifica catch is used as chum for sport fishing. The Japanese industry produces boiled, frozen krill and peeled tail meat. Other uses include krill pastes or processed krill as food additives, e.g. in the form of krill oil gel capsules. Only a small amount of E. superba is processed for human consumption.

Medical applications of krill enzymes include products for treating necrotic tissue and as chemonucleolytic agents. Of the 376 krill-related patents that had been registered world-wide until 2002, 17% related to medical uses. Most of these medical patents had been registered after 1988.

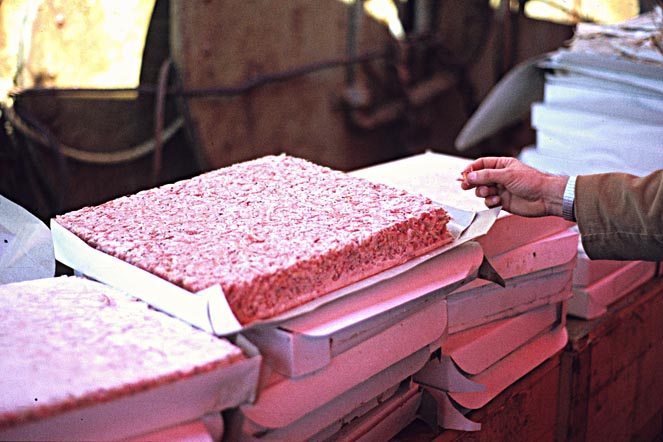
Deep frozen plates of Antarctic krill for use as animal feed and raw material for cooking

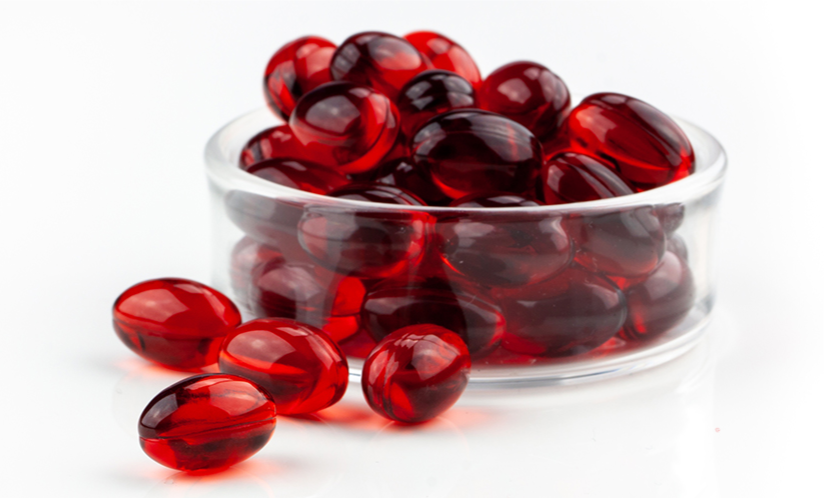
Krill oil capsules

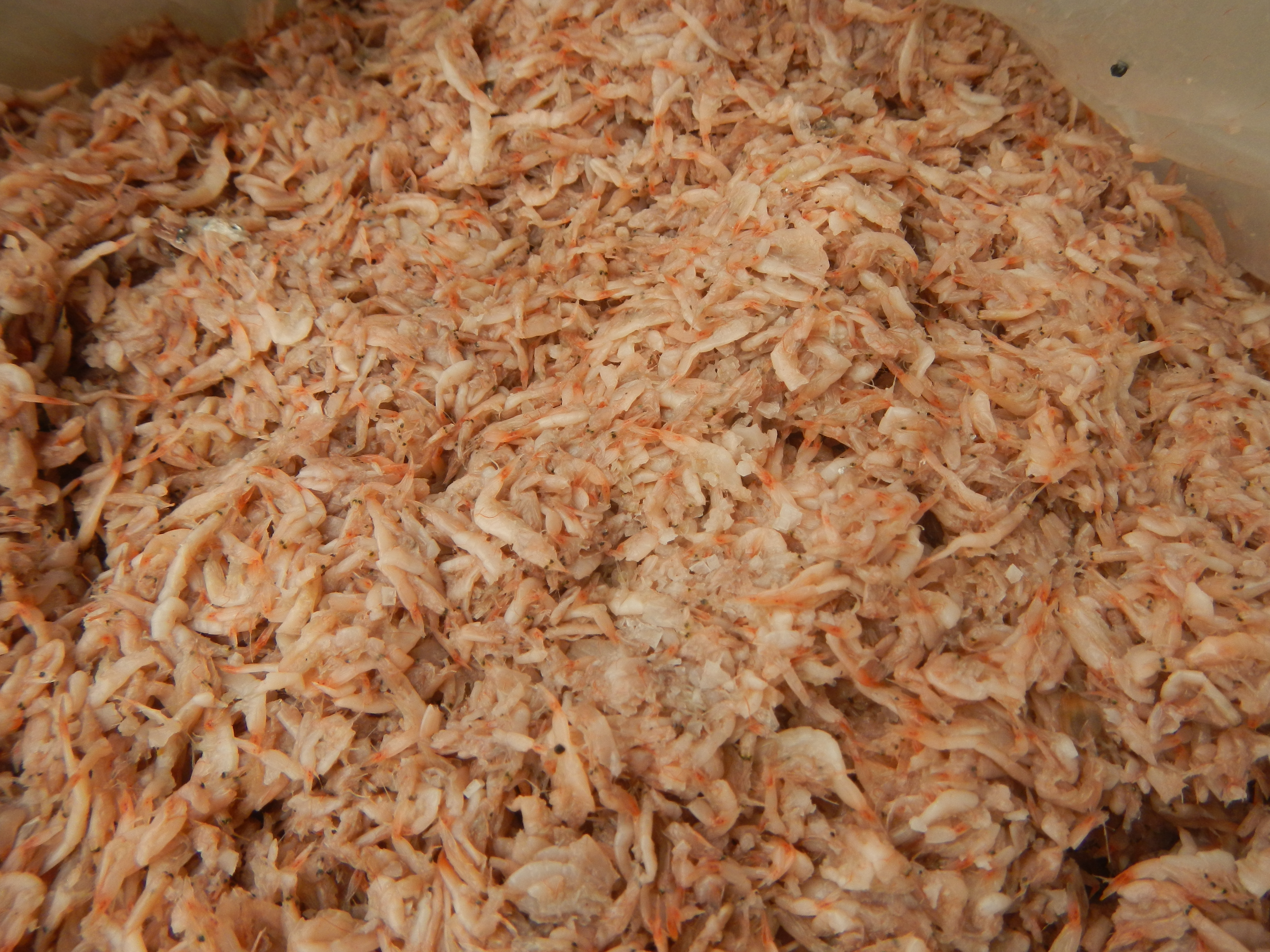
Dried fermented krill, used to make Bagoong alamang, a type of shrimp paste from the Philippines

== Antarctic krill ==
Global capture production of Antarctic krill (Euphausia superba) in thousand tonnes from 1970 to 2022, as reported by the FAO

Krill fishery in the Southern Ocean targets the largest species of krill existing, the Antarctic krill (Euphausia superba), which can grow to about 6 cm (2.4 in). Although krill are found worldwide, fishing in Southern Oceans are preferred because the krill are more "catchable" and abundant in these regions. Particularly in Antarctic seas which are considered as pristine, they are considered a "clean product". Fishing began in the early 1960s, when the Soviet Union launched its first experimental operations. All throughout the decade, preparatory activities were carried out, resulting in small catches of a few tens of tonnes per year. Scientists mapped the locations of krill swarms to determine the best fishing grounds, and engineers developed and improved the equipment necessary to fish and process krill. In 1972, the Soviets set up a permanent fishery in Antarctic waters, landing 7,500 tonnes in 1973 and then expanding quickly. The Japanese began experimental krill fishing operation in the area in 1972 and started full-scale commercial operations in 1975.

Krill catch increased rapidly. In the 1980s, a few additional nations started operating in the area: Poland, Chile, and South Korea. Their catches amounted to a few thousand tonnes annually; the lion's share went to the Soviet Union, followed by Japan. A peak in krill harvest was reached in 1982 with a total production of over 528,000 tonnes, of which the Soviet Union produced 93%. In the following two years, production declined. It is unclear whether this was due to the discovery of fluorides in the krill's exoskeleton or to marketing problems. The trade recovered quickly, though, and reached more than 400,000 tonnes again in 1987.

With the demise of the Soviet Union, two of its successor nations, Russia and Ukraine, took over the operations. Russian operations and catches dwindled, and were abandoned altogether in 1993. Since then, Japan is one of the top producers, but facing stiff competition by other countries. Since 2000, the small South Korean Antarctic krill fishery has also expanded considerably. A United States company entered the market in 2001. The Norwegian company Aker ASA entered the business in 2003 with a ship registered in Vanuatu.

In 1982, the Convention on the Conservation of Antarctic Marine Living Resources (CCAMLR) came into force, as part of the Antarctic Treaty System. The CCAMLR was originally signed by fifteen states; as of 2004 it had 24 members. Its purpose is to regulate the fishery in the Southern Ocean to ensure a long-term sustainable development and to prevent overfishing. In 1993, the CCAMLR set forth catch quotas for krill, which amount to nearly five million tonnes per year.

The annual catch of E. superba from the mid-1990s to 2000s was about 100–120,000 tonnes, i.e., about one fiftieth of the CCAMLR catch quota. A report from 1995 indicated that the total biomass of Antarctic krill has been declining since the start of the 1990s. Plans to take up to 746,000 tonnes a year were disclosed at the 2007 meeting of CCAMLR.

Catch of E. superba by major krill fishing nations from 1980s to 2000s (in 1000 tons)
Country/Years	1980―1989	1990―1999	2000―2009
Japan	519	649	432
Norway	―	—	156
Poland	18	132	100
South Korea	12	9	258
Ukraine	—	144	121
Soviet Union (later Russia)	3,081	680	10
United States	—	—	35
Vanuatu	—	—	77
Total	3,625	1,610	1,191

Fishing for Antarctic krill was commonly done from large stern trawlers using midwater trawls before the purpose built krill trawlers like Antarctic Endurance were planned and put into use. For scientific purposes, vertical trawls using, for example, a bongo net, are also employed. In 2018 it was announced that almost every krill fishing company operating in Antarctica will abandon operations in huge areas around the Antarctic Peninsula from 2020, including “buffer zones” around breeding colonies of penguins. In August 2026, the 620,000-ton limit was reached three months before estimated.

== Around Japan ==
The krill fishery in Japanese waters primarily targets the North Pacific krill (Euphausia pacifica), which reaches a size of about 2 centimetres (0.79 in). The annual catch is of the order of 60–70,000 tonnes. Minor fisheries for Euphausia nana (a few thousand tonnes) and Thysannoessa inermis (a few hundred tonnes annually) also exist. The fishing ground are all above the continental shelf close to the coast and at most 200 m (660 ft) deep. E. nana reaches only 1.2 cm, and T. inermis can grow to 3 cm (1.2 in).

E. pacifica was fished as early as the 19th century. Fishing is done with small boats. The traditional technique uses bow-mounted trawls, augmented by fish pumps since the 1980s. A bow-mounted trawl can exploit only surface swarms of krill up to a depth of about eight metres. In the 1970s, the krill fishery expanded drastically and began to use also one- or two-boat seines, which can catch swarms as deep as 150 m (490 ft). A peak in the krill production was reached in 1992 with over 100,000 tonnes. The following year, catch regulations were enforced, and since then the annual catch has been reduced by about 30%.

== Experimental fisheries ==
Small-scale fisheries for krill also exist in other areas. In Canada, fishing for E. pacifica takes place in the Strait of Georgia off British Columbia; there is a government-imposed catch limit of 500 tonnes per year. Fisheries targeting the Northern krill (Meganyctiphanes norvegica), a medium-sized krill reaching body lengths of more than 4 cm (1.6 in), as well as Tysanoessa raschii (2 cm) and T. inermis in the Gulf of St. Lawrence and on the Scotian Shelf have been proposed, but didn't get beyond early experimental stages. They are limited to harvesting a few hundred tonnes of krill per year, and Nicol & Foster consider it unlikely that any new large-scale harvesting operations in these areas will be started due to the opposition from local fishing industries and conservation groups.

== See also ==
- List of harvested aquatic animals by weight
