= Orne (surname) =

Orne (and its variant Örne) is a surname of Anglo-Saxon origin. It is derived from occupations and referred to a person who produced objects out of horn or musical instruments and also, a person who worked as a hornblower. It may also be related to the personal name Horn and to those who lived in the places, including Rutland, Somerset, or Surrey. The surname was also cited as originated from Norse origin.

Notable people with the surname include.

- Anders Örne (1881–1956), Swedish politician
- Azor Orne (1731–1796), American merchant and politician
- Jerrold Orne (1911–2008), American librarian
- Martin Theodore Orne (1927–2000), American psychologist and scholar
- Sarah Orne Jewett (1849–1909), American novelist

== See also ==
- Orne (disambiguation)
