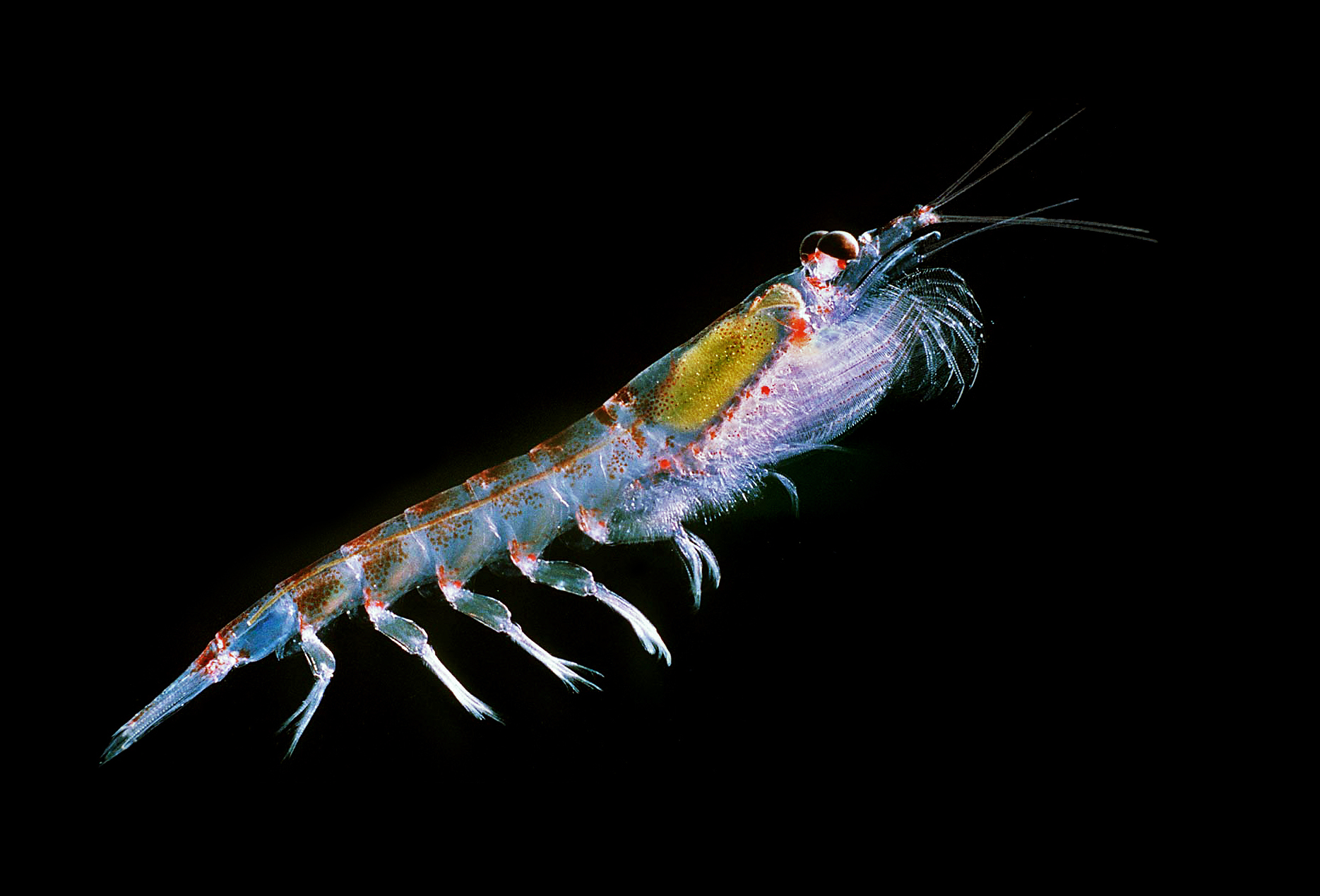
- Euphausia superba

Scientific classification
- Domain: Eukaryota
- Kingdom: Animalia
- Phylum: Arthropoda
- Class: Malacostraca
- Order: Euphausiacea
- Family: Euphausiidae
- Genus: Euphausia; Dana, 1850

Type species
- Euphausia superba Dana, 1850

= Euphausia =

Genus of krill

Euphausia is the largest genus of krill, and is placed in the family Euphausiidae. There are 31 species known in this genus, including Antarctic krill (Euphausia superba) and ice krill (Euphausia crystallorophias) from the Southern Ocean, and North Pacific krill (Euphausia pacifica) in the Pacific Ocean.

== Species ==
- Euphausia americana Hansen, 1911
- Euphausia brevis Hansen, 1905
- Euphausia crystallorophias Holt & Tattersall, 1906
- Euphausia diomedeae Ortmann, 1894
- Euphausia distinguenda Hansen, 1908
- Euphausia eximia Hansen, 1911
- Euphausia fallax Hansen, 1916
- Euphausia frigida Hansen, 1911
- Euphausia gibba G. O. Sars, 1883
- Euphausia gibboides Ortmann, 1893
- Euphausia hanseni Zimmer, 1915
- Euphausia hemigibba Hansen, 1910
- Euphausia krohnii (Brandt, 1851)
- Euphausia lamelligera Hansen, 1911
- Euphausia longirostris Hansen, 1908
- Euphausia lucens Hansen, 1905
- Euphausia mucronata G. O. Sars, 1883
- Euphausia mutica Hansen, 1905
- Euphausia nana Brinton, 1962
- Euphausia pacifica Hansen, 1911
- Euphausia paragibba Hansen, 1910
- Euphausia pseudogibba Ortmann, 1893
- Euphausia recurva Hansen, 1905
- Euphausia sanzoi Torelli, 1934
- Euphausia sibogae Hansen, 1908
- Euphausia similis G. O. Sars, 1885
- Euphausia spinifera G. O. Sars, 1885
- Euphausia superba Dana, 1850
- Euphausia tenera Hansen, 1905
- Euphausia triacantha Holt & Tattersall, 1906
- Euphausia vallentini Stebbing, 1900
- Euphausia gracilis Dana, 1850
- Euphausia splendens Dana, 1850
- Euphausia pellucida Dana, 1850
