= Krill oil =

Commercial oil product from krill

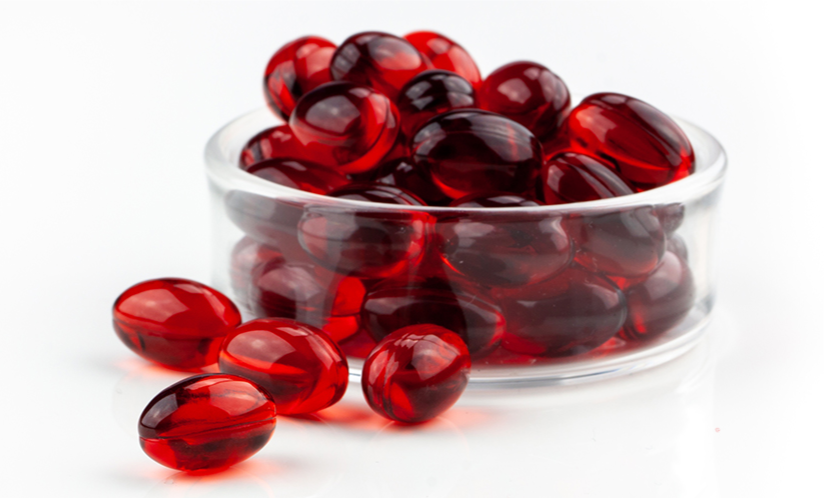
Krill oil capsules

Krill oil is an extract prepared from a species of Antarctic krill, Euphausia superba. Processed krill oil is commonly sold as a dietary supplement. Two components of krill oil are omega-3 fatty acids similar to those in fish oil, and phospholipid-derived fatty acids (PLFA), mainly phosphatidylcholine (alternatively referred to as marine lecithin). Fishing for krill where previously the focus was on marine life of higher trophic level is an example of fishing down the food web.

== Safety and regulation ==
Although there may be toxic residues present in Antarctic krill and fish, the United States Food and Drug Administration has accepted notices from krill oil manufacturers declaring that krill oil and supplement products derived from it meet the standards for generally recognized as safe (GRAS) status.

Krill oil is listed among authorized European novel foods by meeting specification limits.

== Difference between krill oil and fish oil ==
Krill oil and oceanic fish oil are rich in omega-3 fatty acids, mainly eicosapentaenoic acid (EPA) and docosahexaenoic acid (DHA). While both contain some EPA and DHA as free fatty acids, krill oil contains particularly rich amounts of choline-containing phospholipids and a phosphatidylcholine concentration of 34 grams per 100 grams of oil.

Krill oil also contains an appreciable content of astaxanthin at 0.1 to 1.5 mg/ml, depending on processing methods, which is responsible for its red color. While fish oil is generally golden yellow, krill oil tends to be reddish. It is generally more expensive than fish oil.
