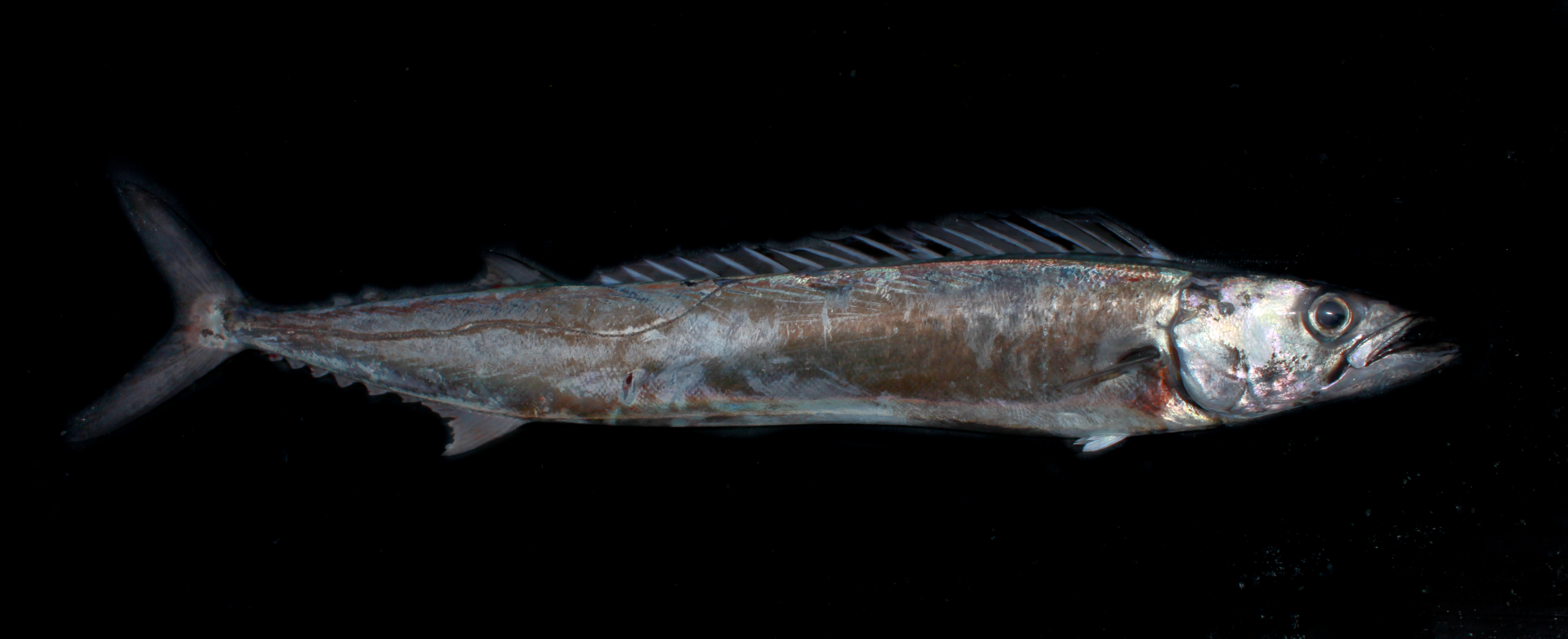

Scientific classification
- Kingdom: Animalia
- Phylum: Chordata
- Class: Actinopterygii
- Order: Scombriformes
- Family: Gempylidae
- Genus: Leionura; Whitley, 1951
- Species: L. atun

Binomial name
- Leionura atun (Euphrasén, 1791)
- Global distribution of Leionura atun

Synonyms
- Scomber atun Euphrasén, 1791; Thyrsites atun (Euphrasén, 1791); Scomber dentatus Forster, 1801; Leionura atun dentatus (Forster, 1801); Thyrsites chilensis Cuvier, 1832; Scomber lanceolatus Cuvier, 1832; Thyrsites altivelis Richardson, 1839; Scomber dentex Forster, 1843; Scomber splendens Richardson, 1843

= Leionura atun =

Genus of fish

Leionura atun (Euphrasén, 1791), known as the snoek in South Africa and as the barracouta in Australasia, is a long, thin species of snake mackerel found in the seas of the Southern Hemisphere, and a common food fish in South Africa, particularly along the west and southwest coast. Despite its Australasian name, it is not closely related to the barracuda.

== Description ==
The fish can reach a length of 200 cm (79 in) SL though most do not exceed 75 cm (30 in) SL. The maximum recorded weight for this species is 6 kilograms (13 lb). It is very important to commercial fisheries and is also a popular game fish. It is currently the only known member of its genus.

L. atun has 19 to 21 dorsal spines and about 113 dorsal rays, 1 anal spine and 10 to 13 anal rays, 35 vertebrae. The body is elongate and compressed, with a single lateral line on the upper body then curving ventrally. Body colour is blue-black on top with a paler belly, first dorsal fin is black. It is believed to contain an anticoagulant in its bite, but this is not supported by scientific research.

== Life cycle and feeding ==
In the South African population 50% sexual maturity occurs at 3 years at a fork length of about 73 cm (29 in).

Spawning occurs during winter and spring, (May to November with a peak from June to October) along the continental shelf break of the western Agulhas bank and the South African west coast, at a depth of between 150 and 400 m (490 and 1,310 ft). The eggs and larvae are transported by currents to the primary nursery area north of Cape Columbine and the secondary nursery area east of Danger Point, where the juveniles remain until maturity. L. atun eggs hatch about 50 hours after fertilization, and the larvae initially eat phytoplankton, first feeding at 3.5 mm (0.14 in), about 3 to 4 days after hatching. When they reach about 8 mm long, they start eating the larvae of other fishes, which are most abundant during spring and summer in this region. After the first year of growth they reach between 33 and 44 cm (13 and 17 in) in length.

The main prey species of the South African population are the Clupeoid fishes sardines, Sardinops sagax and anchovies, Engraulis japonicus, on which it is a major predator in the southern Benguela ecosystem. It consequently affects the zooplankton populations further down the food chain.

Juveniles smaller than 24 cm (9 in) mostly feed on lanternfish (Lampanyctodes hectoris), euphausids (Euphausia lucens), and amphipods (Themisto gaudichaudii). Between 25 and 49 cm (10 and 19 in), lanternfish, T. gaudichaudii, anchovies, and sardines. Subadults from 50 to 74 cm (20 to 29 in), anchovy, euphausids, and sardines. Adults larger than 75 cm (30 in), sardines and anchovies. Offshore, snoek eat almost exclusively teleosts of both pelagic and demersal species, including sardines, roundherring and hake (Merluccius spp). Larger adults eat more hake, sardine and horse-mackerel (Trachurus trachurus). A large number of other species, including a range of invertebrates, have been identified as less frequent prey from analysis of stomach contents.

== Predation ==
The snoek is a near apex predator. They are known to be taken by South African fur seals Arctocephalus pusillus pusillus in South African waters.

== Distribution ==
Leionura atun is widely distributed in the colder waters in the Southern Hemisphere. In the southwest Atlantic, it is known from Uruguay, Argentina and Tierra del Fuego. In the eastern Atlantic, from Tristan da Cunha and South Africa. In the western Indian Ocean, from South Africa and the St. Paul and Amsterdam islands. In the eastern Indian Ocean, Tasmania and the southern coast of continental Australia. In the southwest Pacific, from New Zealand and the southern coast of Australia. In the southeast Pacific, from southern Peru, Chile, and Tierra del Fuego.

On the African coast, it is found from Moçâmedes in northern Angola, along the coast of Namibia and the coast of the Northern Cape and Western Cape provinces of South Africa as far east as Algoa Bay, but mostly between the Kunene River and Cape Agulhas.

Although it is distributed circumglobally, Leionura atun lives in coastal waters, and regional populations may consist of discrete stocks. Off New Zealand, three stocks are recognised. Off Australia, the population may made up from three to five stocks, and it is thought that the southern African population may comprise a northern and a southern stock, with some mixing, mostly from north to south.

== Habitat ==
L. atun is found near continental shelves or around oceanic islands, and feeds on small fish like anchovy and pilchard, crustaceans, cephalopods and other invertebrates.

== Names ==
In South Africa it was originally called the "zeesnoek" (sea snoek) by Dutch colonists who arrived in the Cape in 1652. It is said to have reminded them of the freshwater pike (or snoek) found in the Netherlands.

In Australia it lives in western and southern Australian waters especially off Western Australia, Victoria and Tasmania, where it is called the barracouta.

In New Zealand, it is more common in the colder waters around the South Island. It is also called barracouta in this region.

== Behaviour ==
This species will form schools near the bottom or midwater; sometimes even near the surface at night. It prefers sea water temperature between 13 and 18 °C (55 and 64 °F). Leionura atun are reputed to attack anything that moves near them in the water.

== Fisheries ==
L. atun is important as a food fish over a large part of its distribution. It supports moderate fisheries off southern Australia, Chile, and Tristan da Cunha, and major fisheries off New Zealand and southern Africa.

The South African snoek fisheries have been of commercial importance since the early 1800s. Originally purely a line-fish, they are also caught by pelagic and demersal trawling.

The fish was one of the most important traditional foods of Ngāi Tahu, the Māori people of the South Island of New Zealand. The fish is known in Māori as mangā, or makā in southern dialects. The name mangā is common in Polynesian languages to describe Scombriformes, and fish of a similar appearance.

Māori would typically catch Leionura atun with lures made of Nothofagus wood and hooks made from bird bones or dog teeth. This practice was adopted by early European settlers, who fashioned "coota sticks" from pieces of wood with bent nails attached. The meat was traditionally slow-cooked in a hāngī over several days, and could be preserved for years in bags of bull kelp sealed with fat. Early European settlers to the South Island relied on Leionura atun caught by Māori as a food, and the fish was one of the most common foods eaten by gold diggers during the Otago gold rush of the 1860s.

=== Modern-day use as a food ===
It is sold fresh, smoked, canned and frozen. It can be cooked by frying, broiling, baking, and microwaving. In South Africa, it is often braaied (a form of barbecue). It is also made and eaten as fishcakes in regions such as Japan. It is prepared most often by grilling, frying or smoking. Snoek is oily, extremely bony (although the bones are large and easily removed from the cooked fish) and has very fine scales which are almost undetectable, making it unnecessary to scale the fish while cleaning. Snoek has a very distinctive taste.

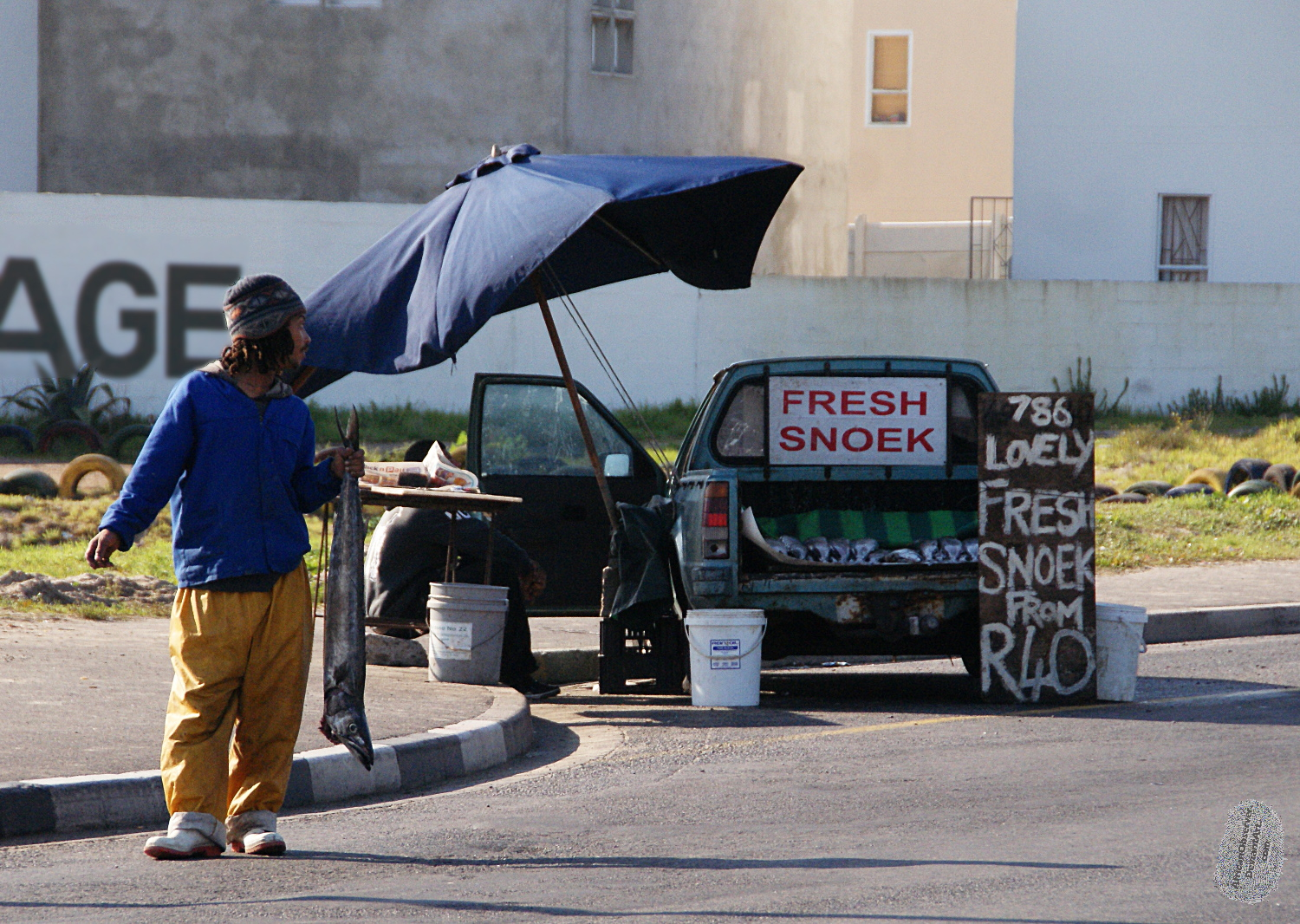
A snoek monger in South Africa, 2012

In South Africa, snoek is caught and consumed along the west and southwestern coastal parts of the country. Commercially, snoek is sold as a prepared and processed food throughout South Africa, usually in the form of packaged smoked snoek, snoek pates and as a canned food.

Fresh Pacific sierra imported from Chile or Mexico may be sold as snoek in the U.S.

Snoek is usually bought fresh at the quay side. In and around Cape Town, this may be at Hout Bay, Kalk Bay and as far as Gordon's Bay. Up the west coast and down the coast towards Mossel Bay, much of the catch is often salted and air-dried for local consumption.

Fresh snoek is typically barbecued over an open grill or wrapped in aluminium foil with butter and herbs and served with boiled sweet potatoes and "tamatiesmoor" – a fried-up hash of chopped tomatoes, onions, garlic and herbs. Another well-known dish is a kedgeree using smoked snoek.

In the Cape Malay community, snoek is a foundation for many dishes. Dishes include smoorsnoek, snoekbredie (a stew), fish bobotie, and snoek pâtés.

In the subsistence fishing communities around the Cape's west coast, snoek together with other species of fish are cleaned, sliced and then packed flat and heavily salted with coarse salt. After a few days in this state, the fish are hung up to air-dry. The dried fish forms part of the community's staple diet as well as a useful trading commodity. Much in the same way as the Portuguese use dried cod to make bacalhau, in these communities the dried fish is soaked in changes of fresh water until the fish is soft. This fish is then added to soups, stews and casseroles using indigenous and locally grown vegetables and often eaten with a variety of staples, including potatoes, yams or rice.

Though very popular in regions like South Africa, it was not so popular to British residents during rationing, during and particularly immediately after the Second World War, due to it being considered a food item of deprivation. Canned snoek (and whale meat) was imported in large quantities into Great Britain and government marketing of the product was not successful and may have had a negative effect. In the end, the vast majority of 10 million tins of snoek from South Africa along with 9 million tins of Australian barracuda were sold off as cat food.
