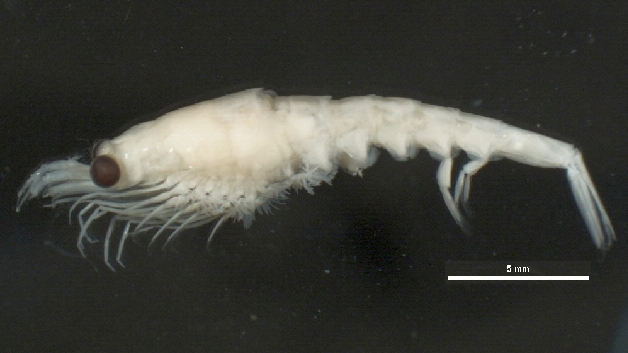

Scientific classification
- Kingdom: Animalia
- Phylum: Arthropoda
- Class: Malacostraca
- Order: Euphausiacea
- Family: Euphausiidae
- Genus: Euphausia
- Species: E. pacifica

Binomial name
- Euphausia pacifica Hansen, 1911

= Euphausia pacifica =

Species of krill

Euphausia pacifica, the North Pacific krill, is a euphausid that lives in the northern Pacific Ocean.

In Japan, E. pacifica is called isada krill or tsunonashi okiami (ツノナシオキアミ). It is found from Suruga Bay northwards, including all of the Sea of Japan and the south-western part of the Sea of Okhotsk. E. pacifica is fished from Cape Inubō north. The annual catch of krill in Japanese seas is limited to 70,000 metric tonnes by government regulations. E. pacifica is also fished, albeit on a smaller scale, in the waters of British Columbia, Canada.

E. pacifica is a major food item for various fish, including Pacific cod, Alaska pollock, chub mackerel, sand lance, North Pacific hake, Pacific herring, dogfish, sablefish, Pacific halibut, chinook salmon and coho salmon.

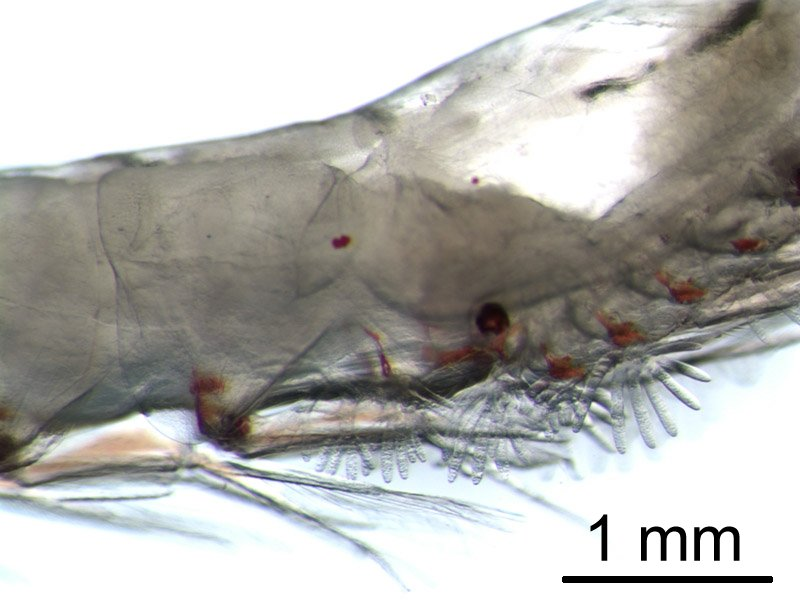
Gills

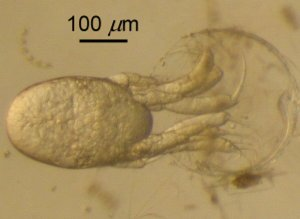
A nauplius of Euphausia pacifica hatching from its egg
