= Orne Harbor =

Cove

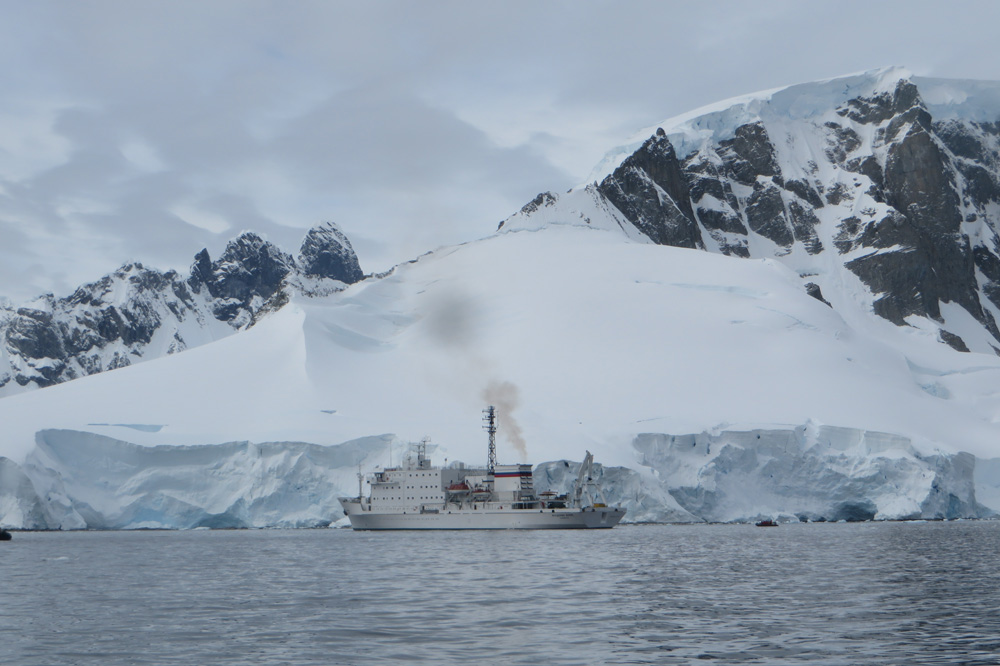
Expedition ship Akademik Ioffe anchored in Orne Harbor in January 2014

Orne Harbor (64°37′S 62°32′W) is a cove one mile wide, indenting the west coast of Graham Land two miles southwest of Cape Anna along the Danco Coast on the west side of the Antarctic Peninsula. Discovered by the Belgian Antarctic Expedition under Gerlache in 1898. The name Orne Harbor was probably in use by Norwegian whalers, because it was used by Scottish geologist David Ferguson following his geologic reconnaissance of this area aboard the whaler Hanka in 1913.

Orne Harbor is a popular excursion site for tourist expeditions to the Antarctic Peninsula. Activities including kayaking in the harbor and visiting a nearby chinstrap penguin colony.

== See also ==
- Sophie Rocks
