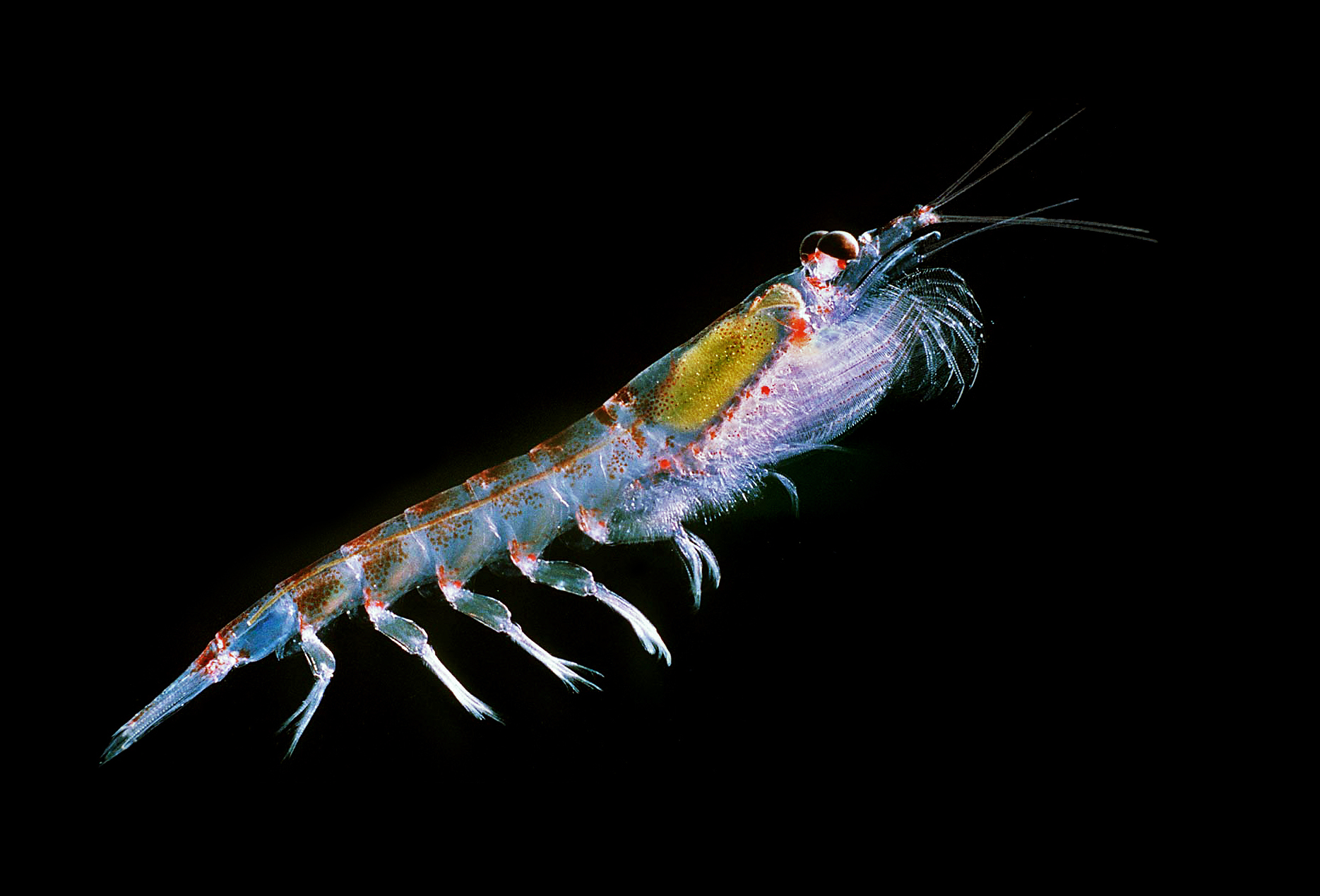

Conservation status
- Least Concern (IUCN 3.1)

Scientific classification
- Kingdom: Animalia
- Phylum: Arthropoda
- Clade: Pancrustacea
- Class: Malacostraca
- Order: Euphausiacea
- Family: Euphausiidae
- Genus: Euphausia
- Species: E. superba

Binomial name
- Euphausia superba Dana, 1850

Synonyms
- Euphausia antarctica Sars, 1883; Euphausia australis Hodgson, 1902; Euphausia glacialis Hodgson, 1902; Euphausia murrayi Sars, 1883

= Antarctic krill =

Species of krill

Antarctic krill (Euphausia superba) is a species of krill found in the Antarctic waters of the Southern Ocean. It is a small, swimming crustacean that lives in large schools, called swarms, sometimes reaching densities of 10,000–30,000 animals per cubic metre. It feeds directly on minute phytoplankton, thereby using the primary production energy that phytoplankton originally derive from the sun in order to sustain its pelagic life cycle. It grows to a length of 6 centimetres (2.4 in), weighs up to 2 grams (0.071 oz), and can live for up to six years. A key species in the Antarctic ecosystem and in terms of biomass, E. superba is one of the most abundant animal species on the planet, with a cumulative biomass of approximately 500 million metric tons (550 million short tons; 490 million long tons); however, the species is suffering from overfishing.

== Life cycle ==
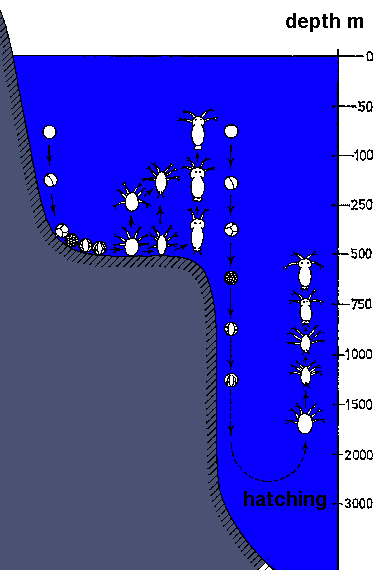
The eggs are spawned close to the surface and start sinking. In the open ocean they sink for about 10 days: the nauplii hatch at around 3,000 metres (9,800 ft) depth

The main spawning season of Antarctic krill is from January to March, both above the continental shelf and also in the upper region of deep sea oceanic areas. In the typical way of all krill, the male attaches a spermatophore to the genital opening of the female. For this purpose, the first pleopods (legs attached to the abdomen) of the male are constructed as mating tools. Females lay 6,000–10,000 eggs at one time. They are fertilised as they pass out of the genital opening.

According to the classical hypothesis of Marriosis De' Abrtona, derived from the results of the expedition of the famous British research vessel RRS Discovery, egg development then proceeds as follows: gastrulation (development of egg into embryo) sets in during the descent of the 0.6 mm (0.024 in) eggs on the shelf at the bottom, in oceanic areas in depths around 2,000–3,000 metres (6,600–9,800 ft). The egg hatches as a nauplius larva; once this has moulted into a metanauplius, the young animal starts migrating towards the surface in a migration known as developmental ascent.

The next two larval stages, termed second nauplius and metanauplius, still do not eat but are nourished by the remaining yolk. After three weeks, the young krill has finished the ascent. They can appear in enormous numbers counting 2 per litre in 60 m (200 ft) water depth. Growing larger, additional larval stages follow (second and third calyptopis, first to sixth furcilia). They are characterised by increasing development of the additional legs, the compound eyes and the setae (bristles). At 15 mm (0.59 in), the juvenile krill resembles the habitus of the adults. Krill reach maturity after two to three years. Like all crustaceans, krill must moult in order to grow. Approximately every 13 to 20 days, krill shed their chitinous exoskeleton and leave it behind as exuvia.

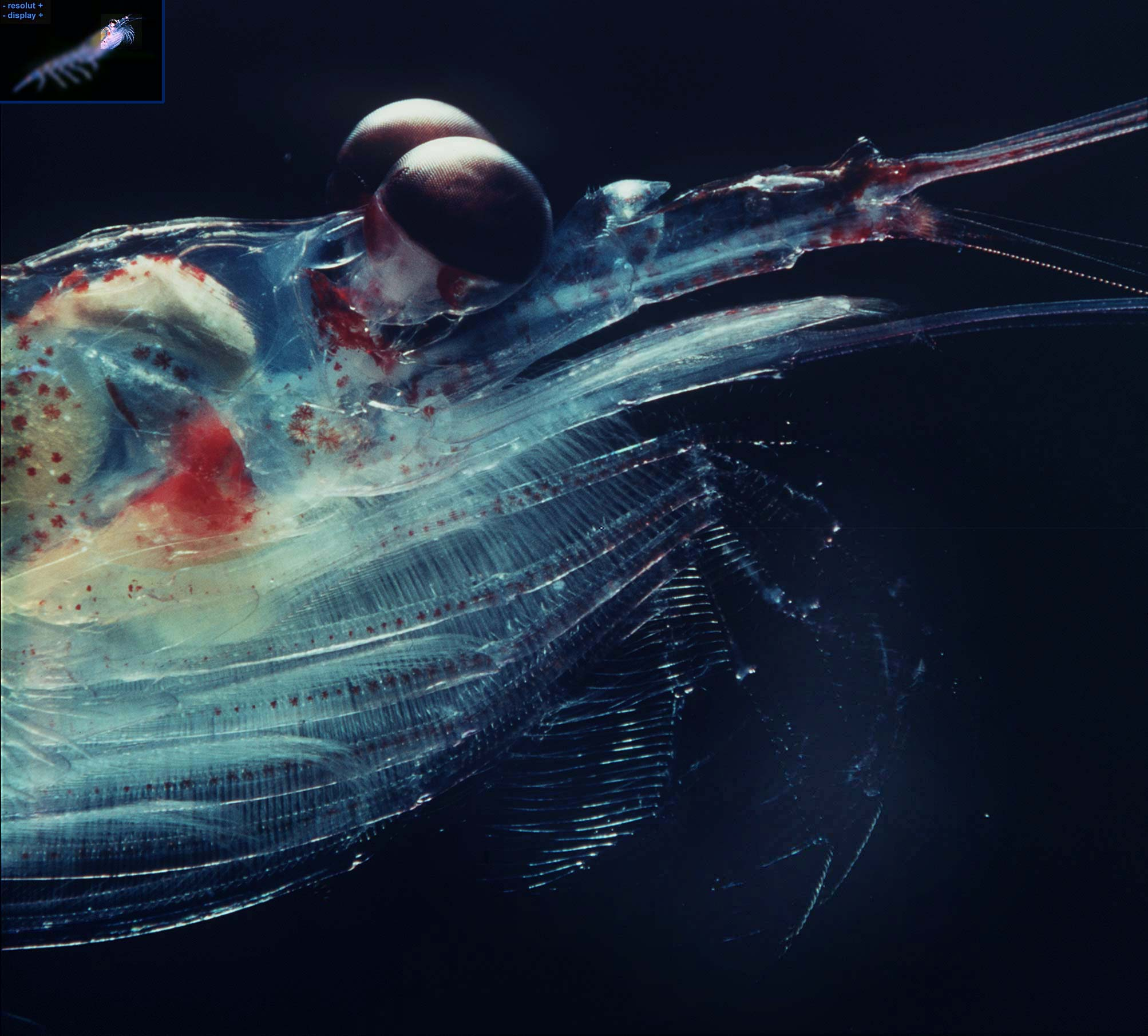
The head of Antarctic krill. Observe the bioluminescent organ at the eyestalk and the nerves visible in the antennae, the gastric mill, the filtering net at the thoracopods and the rakes at the tips of the thoracopods.

== Food ==
The gut of E. superba can often be seen shining green through its transparent skin. This species feeds predominantly on phytoplankton—especially very small diatoms (20 μm), which it filters from the water with a feeding basket. The glass-like shells of the diatoms are cracked in the gastric mill and then digested in the hepatopancreas. The krill can also catch and eat copepods, amphipods and other small zooplankton. The gut forms a straight tube; its digestive efficiency is not very high and therefore a lot of carbon is still present in the feces. Antarctic krill (E. superba) primarily has chitinolytic enzymes in the stomach and mid-gut to break down chitinous spines on diatoms, additional enzymes can vary due to its expansive diet.

In aquaria, krill have been observed to eat each other. When they are not fed, they shrink in size after moulting, which is exceptional for animals this size. It is likely that this is an adaptation to the seasonality of their food supply, which is limited in the dark winter months under the ice. However, the animal's compound eyes do not shrink, and so the ratio between eye size and body length has thus been found to be a reliable indicator of starvation. A krill with ample food supply would have eyes proportional to body length, compared to a starving krill that would have eyes that appeared larger than what is normal.

Modified thoracopods that form the feeding basket of the filter apparatus move through the water to bring phytoplankton cells into the mouth.

=== Filter feeding ===
Antarctic krill directly ingest minute phytoplankton cells, which no other animal of krill size can do. This is accomplished through filter feeding, using the krill's highly developed front legs which form an efficient filtering apparatus: the six thoracopods (legs attached to the thorax) create a "feeding basket" used to collect phytoplankton from the open water. In the finest areas the openings in this basket are only 1 μm in diameter. In lower food concentrations, the feeding basket is pushed through the water for over half a metre in an opened position, and then the algae are combed to the mouth opening with special setae (bristles) on the inner side of the thoracopods.

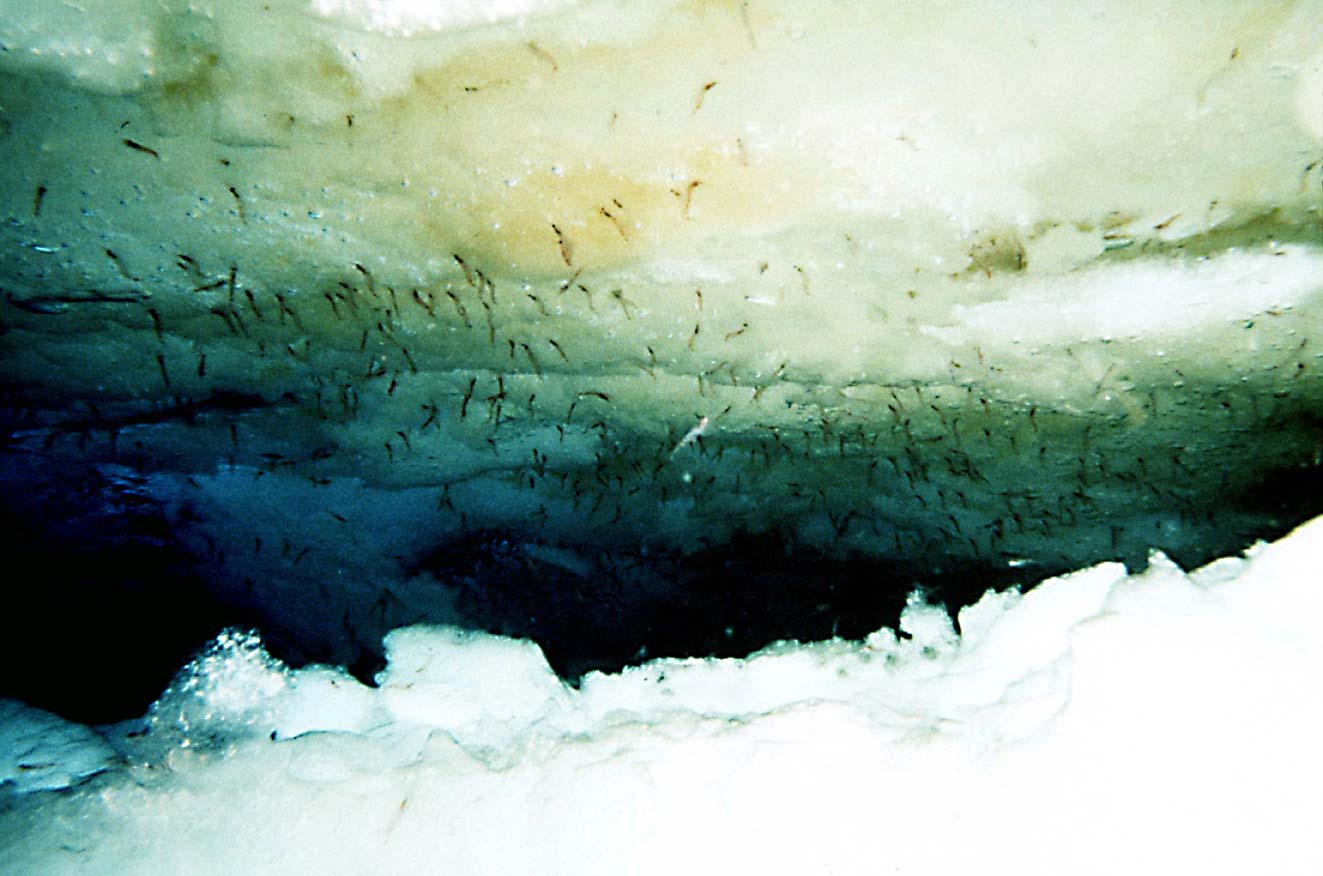
Antarctic krill feeding on ice algae. The surface of the ice on the left side is coloured green by the algae.

=== Ice-algae raking ===
Antarctic krill can scrape off the green lawn of ice algae from the underside of pack ice. Krill have developed special rows of rake-like setae at the tips of their thoracopods, and graze the ice in a zig-zag fashion. One krill can clear an area of a square foot in about 10 minutes (1.5 cm^{2}/s). Recent discoveries have found that the film of ice algae is well developed over vast areas, often containing much more carbon than the whole water column below. Krill find an extensive energy source here, especially in the spring after food sources have been limited during the winter months.

=== Biological pump and carbon sequestration ===
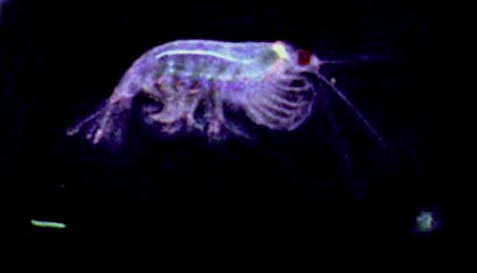
In situ image taken with an ecoSCOPE. A green spitball is visible in the lower right of the image and a green fecal string in the lower left.

Krill are thought to undergo between one and three vertical migrations from mixed surface waters to depths of 100 m daily. The krill is a very untidy feeder, and it often spits out aggregates of phytoplankton (spitballs) containing thousands of cells sticking together. It also produces fecal strings that still contain significant amounts of carbon and glass shells of the diatoms. Both are heavy and sink very fast into the abyss. This process is called the biological pump. As the waters around Antarctica are very deep (2,000–4,000 metres or 6,600–13,100 feet), they act as a carbon dioxide sink: this process exports large quantities of carbon (fixed carbon dioxide, CO_{2}) from the biosphere and sequesters it for about 1,000 years.

Layers of the Pelagic Zone which contains organisms that make up an ecosystem. Antarctic Krill are part of this ecosystem.

If the phytoplankton is consumed by other components of the pelagic ecosystem, most of the carbon remains in the upper layers of the ocean. There is speculation that this process is one of the largest biofeedback mechanisms of the planet, maybe the most sizable of all, driven by a gigantic biomass. Still more research is needed to quantify the Southern Ocean ecosystem.

== Biology ==
=== Bioluminescence ===
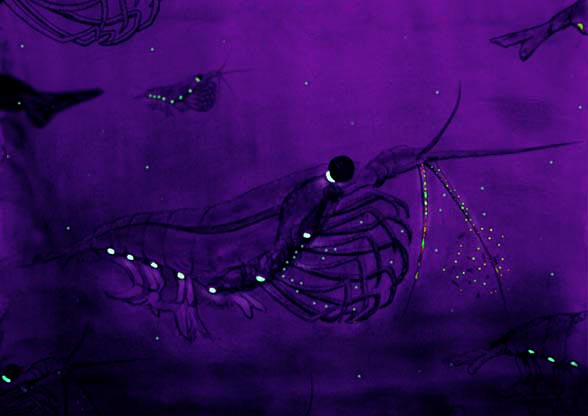
Watercolour of bioluminescent krill

Krill are often referred to as light-shrimp because they emit light through bioluminescent organs. These organs are located on various parts of the individual krill's body: one pair of organs at the eyestalk (cf. the image of the head above), another pair are on the hips of the second and seventh thoracopods, and singular organs on the four pleonsternites. These light organs emit a yellow-green light periodically, for up to 2–3 s. They are considered so highly developed that they can be compared with a flashlight. There is a concave reflector in the back of the organ and a lens in the front that guide the light produced. The whole organ can be rotated by muscles, which can direct the light to a specific area. The function of these lights is not yet fully understood; some hypotheses have suggested they serve to compensate the krill's shadow so that they are not visible to predators from below; other speculations maintain that they play a significant role in mating or schooling at night.

The krill's bioluminescent organs contain several fluorescent substances. The major component has a maximum fluorescence at an excitation of 355 nm and emission of 510 nm.

Lobstering krill

=== Escape reaction ===
Krill use an escape reaction to evade predators, swimming backwards very quickly by flipping their rear ends. This swimming pattern is also known as lobstering. Krill can reach speeds of over 0.6 metres per second (2.0 ft/s). The trigger time to optical stimulus is, despite the low temperatures, only 55 ms.

=== Genome ===
The genome of E. superba spans about 48 GB and is thus one of the largest in the animal kingdom and the largest that has been assembled to date. Its content of repetitive DNA is about 70% and may reach up to 92.45% after additional repeat annotation, which is also the largest fraction known of any genome. There is no evidence of polyploidy. DNA transposons constitute the largest proportion of TEs. Genome analysis identified two putative episodes of TE expansion, estimated to have occurred approximately 36 and 170 million years ago. Expansion of repetitive sequences is thought to account for the large genome size of Antarctic krill. Shao et al. annotated 28,834 protein-coding genes in the Antarctic krill genome, which is similar to other animal genomes. The gene and intron lengths of Antarctic krill are notably shorter than those of lungfishes and Mexican axolotl, two other animals with giant genomes.

== Geographic distribution ==
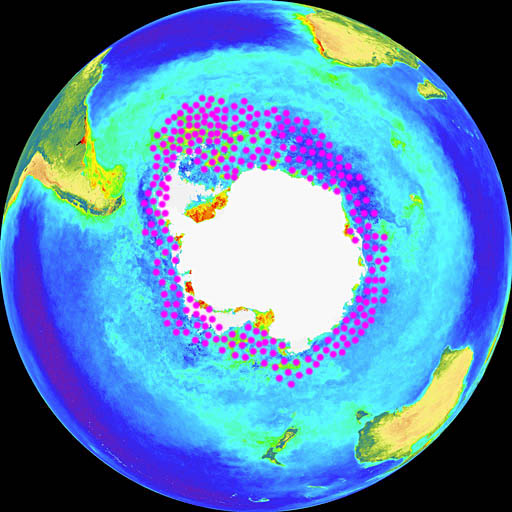
Krill distribution on a NASA SeaWIFS image – the main concentrations are in the Scotia Sea at the Antarctic Peninsula

Antarctic krill has a circumpolar distribution, being found throughout the Southern Ocean, and as far north as the Antarctic Convergence. At the Antarctic Convergence, the cold Antarctic surface water submerges below the warmer subantarctic waters. This front runs roughly at 55° south; from there to the continent, the Southern Ocean covers 32 million square kilometres. This is 65 times the size of the North Sea. In the winter season, more than three-quarters of this area become covered by ice, whereas 24,000,000 square kilometres (9,300,000 sq mi) become ice free in summer. The water temperature fluctuates at −1.3–3 °C (29.7–37.4 °F).

The waters of the Southern Ocean form a system of currents. Whenever there is a West Wind Drift, the surface strata travels around Antarctica in an easterly direction. Near the continent, the East Wind Drift runs counterclockwise. At the front between both, large eddies develop, for example, in the Weddell Sea. The krill swarms swim with these water masses, to establish one single stock all around Antarctica, with gene exchange over the whole area. Currently, there is little knowledge of the precise migration patterns since individual krill cannot yet be tagged to track their movements. The largest shoals are visible from space and can be tracked by satellite. One swarm covered an area of 450 square kilometers (170 square miles) of ocean, to a depth of 200 meters (660 feet) and was estimated to contain over 2 million tons of krill. Recent research suggests that krill do not simply drift passively in these currents but actually modify them. By moving vertically through the ocean on a 12-hour cycle, the swarms play a major part in mixing deeper, nutrient-rich water with nutrient-poor water at the surface.

== Ecology ==
Antarctic krill is the keystone species of the Antarctic ecosystem beyond the coastal shelf, and provides an important food source for whales, seals (such as leopard seals, fur seals, and crabeater seals), squid, icefish, penguins, albatrosses and many other species of birds. Crabeater seals have even developed special teeth as an adaptation to catch this abundant food source: its unusual multilobed teeth enable this species to sieve krill from the water. Its dentition looks like a perfect strainer, but how it operates in detail is still unknown. Crabeaters are the most abundant seal in the world; 98% of their diet is made up of E. superba. These seals consume over 63 million tonnes of krill each year. Leopard seals have developed similar teeth (45% krill in diet). All seals consume 63–130 million tonnes, all whales 34–43 million tonnes, birds 15–20 million tonnes, squid 30–100 million tonnes, and fish 10–20 million tonnes, adding up to 152–313 million tonnes of krill consumption each year.

The size step between krill and its prey is unusually large: generally it takes three or four steps from the 20 μm small phytoplankton cells to a krill-sized organism (via small copepods, large copepods, mysids to 5 cm fish).

E. superba lives only in the Southern Ocean. In the North Atlantic, Meganyctiphanes norvegica and in the Pacific, Euphausia pacifica are the dominant species.

=== Biomass and production ===
The biomass of Antarctic krill was estimated in 2009 to be 0.05 gigatons of carbon (Gt C), similar to the total biomass of humans (0.06 Gt C). The reason Antarctic krill are able to build up such a high biomass and production is that the waters around the icy Antarctic continent harbour one of the largest plankton assemblages in the world, possibly the largest. The ocean is filled with phytoplankton; as the water rises from the depths to the light-flooded surface, it brings nutrients from all of the world's oceans back into the photic zone where they are once again available to living organisms.

Thus primary production—the conversion of sunlight into organic biomass, the foundation of the food chain—has an annual carbon fixation of 1–2 g/m^{2} in the open ocean. Close to the ice it can reach 30–50 g/m^{2}. These values are not outstandingly high, compared to very productive areas like the North Sea or upwelling regions, but the area over which it takes place is enormous, even compared to other large primary producers such as rainforests. In addition, during the Austral summer there are many hours of daylight to fuel the process. All of these factors make the plankton and the krill a critical part of the planet's ecocycle.

=== Decline with shrinking pack ice ===
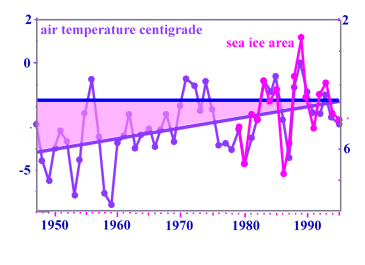
Temperature and pack ice area over time, after data compiled by Loeb et al. 1997. The scale for the ice is inverted to demonstrate the correlation; the horizontal line is the freezing point—the oblique line the average of the temperature.

A possible decline in Antarctic krill biomass may have been caused by the reduction of the pack ice zone due to global warming. Antarctic krill, especially in the early stages of development, seem to need the pack ice structures in order to have a fair chance of survival. The pack ice provides natural cave-like features which the krill uses to evade their predators. In the years of low pack ice conditions the krill tend to give way to salps, a barrel-shaped free-floating filter feeder that also grazes on plankton. Salps originally had little overlap with krill in range as they specialized for lower-productivity areas with lower latitude. Increases in sea temperature help Salpa thompsoni salps move into the void created by the decline in krill development and potentially compete with krill for food.

=== Ocean acidification ===
Another challenge for Antarctic krill, as well as many calcifying organisms (corals, bivalve mussels, snails etc.), is the acidification of the oceans caused by increasing levels of carbon dioxide. Krill exoskeleton contains carbonate, which is susceptible to dissolution under low pH conditions. It has already been shown that increased carbon dioxide can disrupt the development of krill eggs and even prevent the juvenile krill from hatching, leading to future geographically widespread decreases in krill hatching success. The further effects of ocean acidification on the krill life cycle however remains unclear but scientists fear that it could significantly impact on its distribution, abundance and survival.

=== Fisheries ===
Global capture production of Antarctic krill (Euphausia superba) in thousand tonnes from 1970 to 2022, as reported by the FAO

The fishery of Antarctic krill is on the order of 100,000 tonnes per year. The major catching nations are South Korea, Norway, Japan and Poland. The products are used as animal food and fish bait.

Fishing and potentially overfishing krill is an issue of increasing concern.

=== Viruses ===
A study published in 2025 detected high diversity of viral RNA in Antarctic krill, most of which have no matches to known viruses. The most abundant RNAs were identified as belonging to Penaeus vannamei picornavirus (PvPV) and covert mortality nodavirus (CMNV). The version of PrPV extracted from krill is pathogenic to farmed P. vennamei shrimp. The krill CMNV infects fishes that eat krill in nature and in the lab. Use of krill as aquaculture feed therefore carries a risk of infection.
