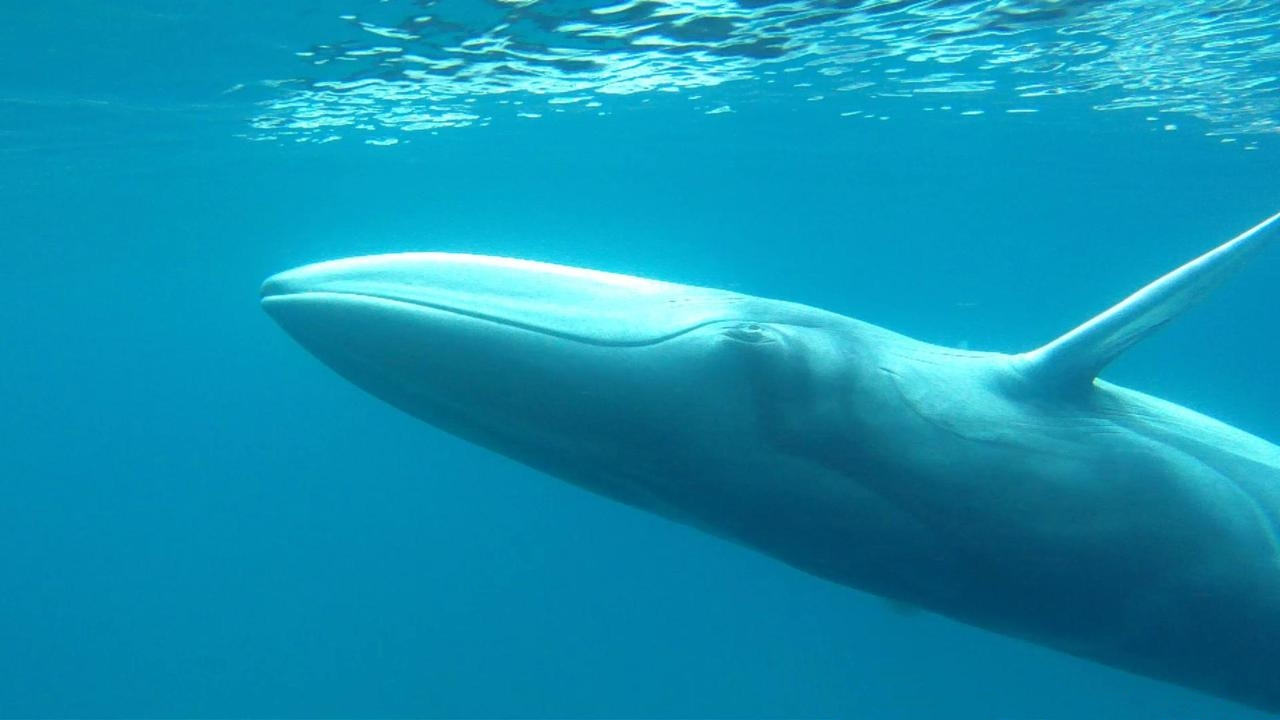
- Omura's whale

Conservation status
- Data Deficient (IUCN 3.1)
- CITES Appendix I

Scientific classification
- Kingdom: Animalia
- Phylum: Chordata
- Class: Mammalia
- Order: Artiodactyla
- Infraorder: Cetacea
- Family: Balaenopteridae
- Genus: Balaenoptera
- Species: B. omurai

Binomial name
- Balaenoptera omurai Wada, Oishi & Yamada, 2003
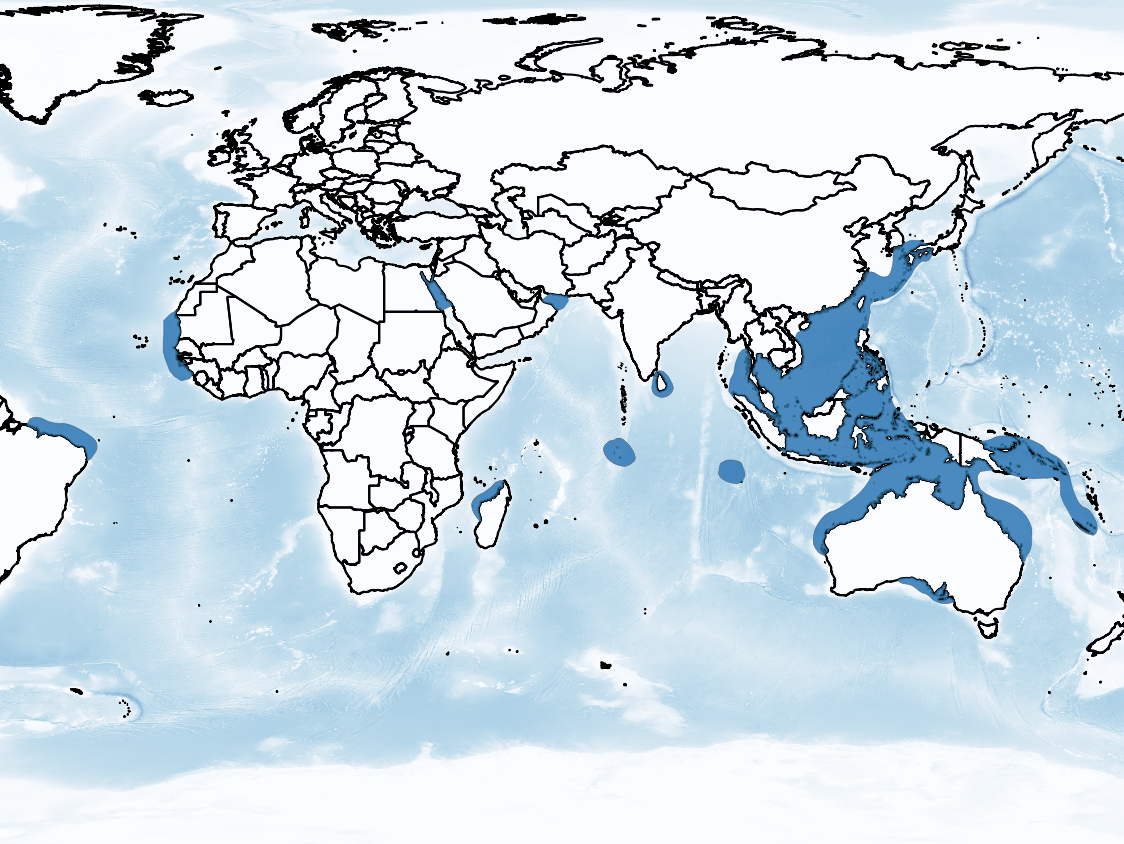

= Omura's whale =

Species of mammal

Omura's whale or the dwarf fin whale (Balaenoptera omurai) is a species of rorqual about which very little is known. Before its formal description, it was referred to as a small, dwarf or pygmy form of Bryde's whale by various sources. The common name and specific epithet commemorate Japanese cetologist Hideo Omura.

The scientific description of this whale was made in Nature in 2003 by three Japanese scientists. They determined the existence of the species by analysing the morphology and mitochondrial DNA of nine individuals – eight caught by Japanese research vessels in the late 1970s in the Indo-Pacific and an adult female collected in 1998 from Tsunoshima, an island in the Sea of Japan. Later, abundant genetic evidence confirmed Omura's whale as a valid species and revealed it to be an early offshoot from the rorqual lineage, diverging much earlier than Bryde's and sei whales. It is perhaps more closely related to its larger relative, the blue whale.

In the third edition of Mammal Species of the World, the "species" is relegated to being a synonym of Balaenoptera edeni. However, the authors note that this is subject to a revision of the genus. The database ITIS lists this as a valid taxon, noting a caveat on the disputed systematics of this species, Balaenoptera edeni and Balaenoptera brydei.

== Taxonomy ==
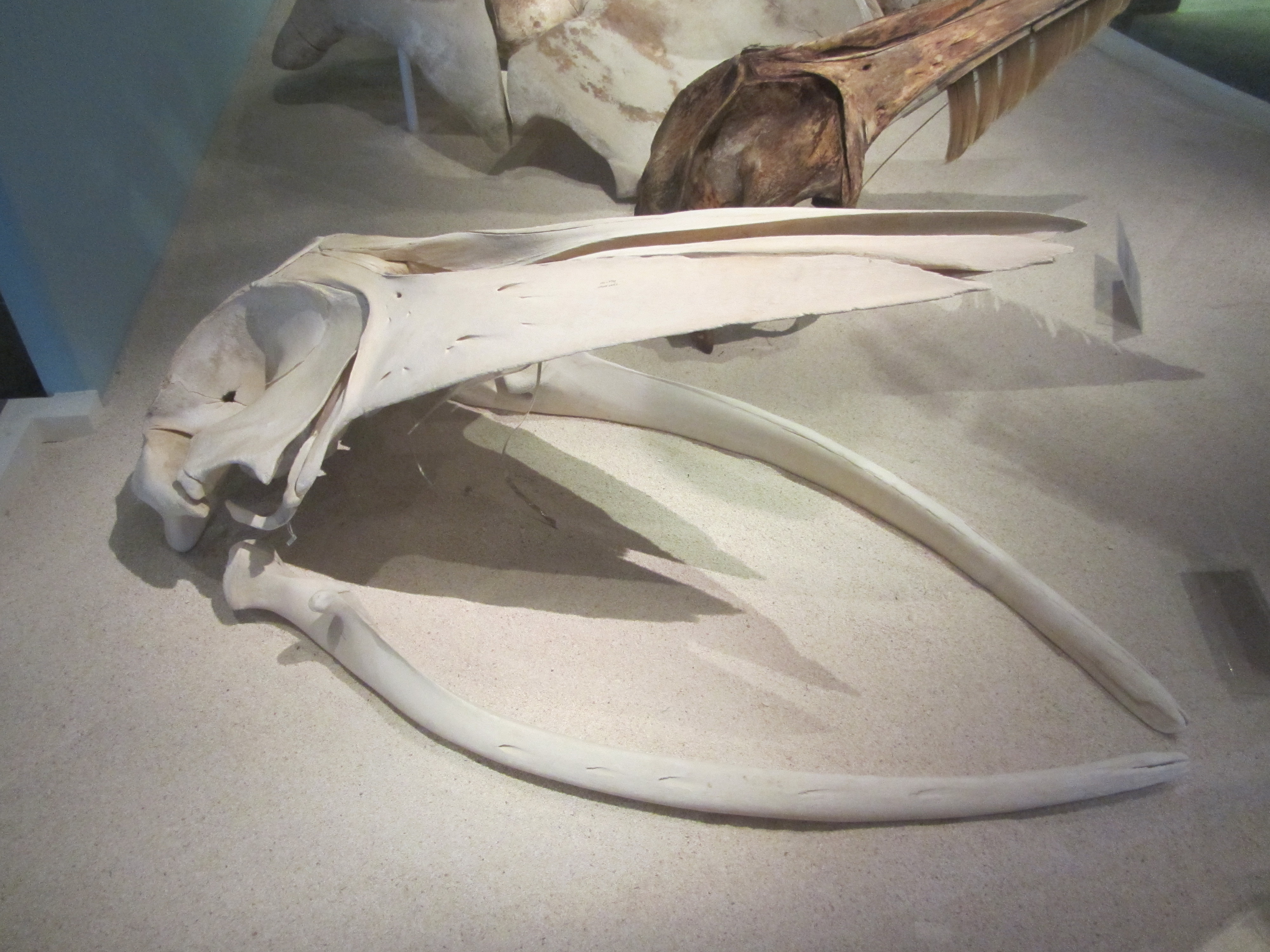
Skull of Omura's whale in National Museum of Natural Science

The six specimens obtained in the Solomon Sea in 1976 were only noted to be smaller at sexual maturity than the "ordinary" Bryde's whales caught off New Zealand, whereas the two caught near the Cocos-Keeling Islands in 1978 were not differentiated from the 118 other "ordinary" Bryde's whales taken in the eastern Indian Ocean, south of Java. As a result of allozyme analysis, their distinctive baleen and small size at physical maturity compared to Bryde's whale, and photographs obtained of the harvested whales (showing their fin whale-like coloration), Shiro Wada and Kenichi Numachi (1991) decided that these eight individuals represented members of a new species of baleen whale. However, due to the lack of a detailed osteological study and the absence of "conclusive data", the International Whaling Commission decided to consider them only as a regionally distinct group of "small-form Bryde's whale". Despite this declaration, the specific status of the Solomon Sea specimens was supported by a mitochondrial DNA study done by Hideyoshi Yoshida and Hidehiro Kato (1999).

The identity of these eight specimens was finally resolved in 1998 when an unidentified whale, which had died after colliding with a fishing boat in the Sea of Japan and was towed to Tsunoshima, was examined by Tadasu Yamada, Chief of the Division of Mammals and Birds at the National Science Museum, Tokyo. This specimen closely resembled the individuals caught in the 1970s in external appearance and allowed a complete osteological examination of the putative new species to be conducted. As a result of external morphology, osteology, and mitochondrial DNA analysis of two of the harvested whales and the Tsunoshima specimen, Wada, Masayuki Oishi, and Yamada described Balaenoptera omurai in the 20 November 2003 issue of the journal Nature. In honour of the people of Tsunoshima, who helped remove the flesh from the type specimen, it was given the Japanese vernacular name of Tsunoshima kujira (English: Horn Island whale).

== Holotype and paratypes ==
The holotype is an 11.03 m (36.2 ft) adult female, NSMT-M32505 (National Science Museum, Tokyo), which stranded at Tsunoshima (34°21′03″N 130°53′09″E) in the southern Sea of Japan on 11 September 1998. It includes a complete skeleton, both complete rows of baleen plates, and frozen pieces of muscle, blubber, and kidney collected by T. K. Yamada, M. Oishi, T. Kuramochi, E. Jibiki, and S. Fujioka. The type locality is the Sea of Japan, which may not be representative of the species' typical range. The paratypes include the eight specimens (five females and three males), NRIFSF1-8 (National Research Institute of Far Seas Fisheries, Fisheries Research Agency, Shizuoka), collected by Japanese research vessels in the Indo-Pacific in the late 1970s. The longest baleen plate (NRIFSF6 includes 18 more baleen plates), an earplug, and a piece of the sixth thoracic vertebra with associated epiphysis were collected from each individual.

== Description ==
=== Osteology ===
Omura's whale has several unique skeletal features that distinguish it from its congeners, namely B. brydei and B. edeni. In B. omurai and B. brydei, the posterior end of the ascending process of the maxilla widens to become squarish, whereas in B. edeni, it is slender and round throughout its length. In B. omurai, this widened posterior portion conceals the premaxilla, which disappears below the maxilla and nasal and does not reach the frontal, whereas in both B. brydei and B. edeni, the premaxilla reaches the frontal. The parietals flare laterally in dorsal view in B. omurai and the Indo-Pacific form of B. brydei, but are invisible in dorsal view in B. edeni and the North Pacific form of B. brydei. B. omurai has two small foramina "along the suture between the parietal and squamosal in the posterior wall of the temporal fossa", which both B. brydei and B. edeni lack. B. omurai has an oblique ridge on the dorsal side of the maxilla near the base of the rostrum, which is absent in both B. brydei and B. edeni. Unlike B. edeni, the alisphenoid is separate from the squamosal in B. omurai. The head of the first rib is not bifurcated in B. omurai, unlike B. brydei and B. edeni.

Omura's whale has a total of 53 vertebrae, including seven cervical (the standard number among mammals), 13 thoracic, 12 lumbar, and 21 caudal. Like all members of its genus, it has only four digits on the manus of each pectoral fin (the third digit is missing). The phalangeal formula is: I-5, II-7, IV-6, V-3.

=== External appearance ===
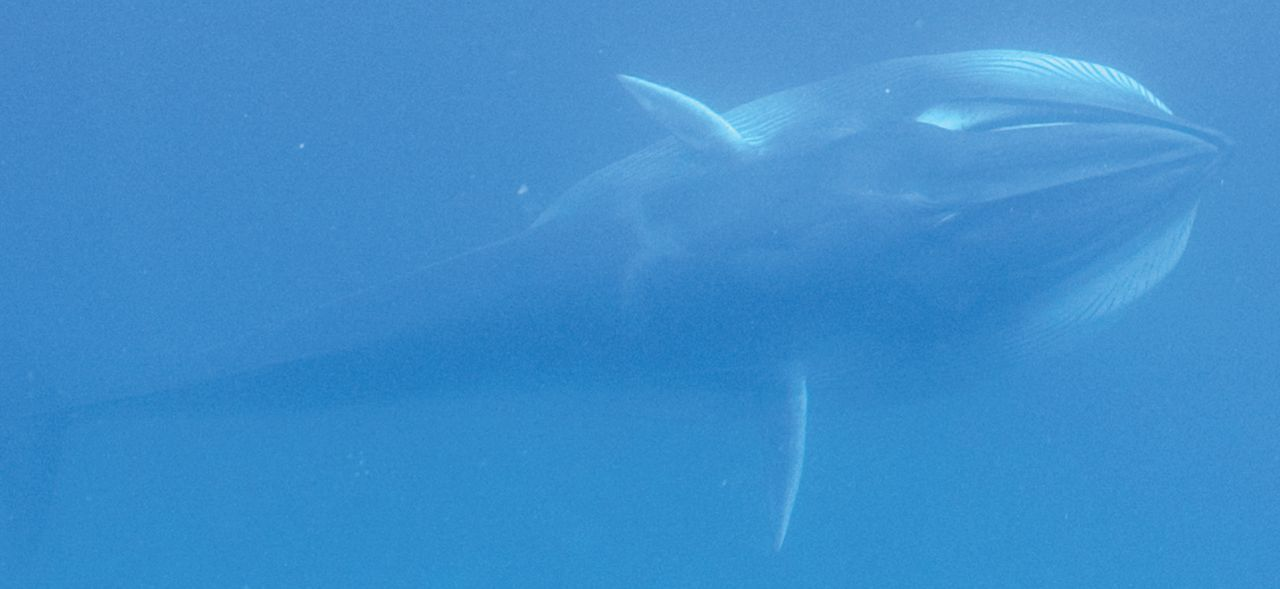
Feeding off Nosy Be, Madagascar

Its appearance resembles the larger fin whale (thus the alternate common names of dwarf fin whale and little fin whale), both having a dark gray left lower jaw, and on the right side a white mandible patch, a white blaze, a dark eye stripe, a white inter-stripe wash, as well as a white chevron on the back, pectoral fins with a white anterior border and inner surface, and flukes with a white ventral surface and black margins. Like fin whales, it also exhibits a white left gape and a dark right gape, a reversal of the asymmetrical pigmentation on the lower jaw. It has a very falcate dorsal fin with a leading edge that gradually slopes into the back, halfway in shape between the more gradual slope of the fin whale and the more acute angle of Bryde's and sei whales. Its dorsal fin is also proportionally smaller and less upright than these other species. It typically has a single prominent median ridge on the rostrum, but can have faint lateral ridges, which are more pronounced in calves. Bryde's whale, on the other hand, has three prominent ridges on the rostrum. It has 45 to 95 ventral grooves that extend past the umbilicus. The type specimen (NSMT-M32505) had 203-208 pairs of baleen plates that were "short and broad with uncurled, stiff, grayish-white fringes", while NRIFSF6 had an estimated 181–190 on the right side – fewer than any other species in its genus. Other specimens of Omura's whale had between 204 and 246 pairs of baleen plates. Like the fin whale, NSMT-M32505 exhibited asymmetrical coloration in its baleen, as well: on the right side, the front third are yellowish-white, the intermediate 100 plates are bi-colored (dark on the outer side and yellowish-white on the inner side), and the remaining plates in the back were all black, while on the left side, the majority are bi-colored with the remaining back plates being all black like the right side. The average length and width for the nine specimens was 26 by 21.4 cm (10.2 by 8.4 in), the smallest length-to-breadth quotient (1.22) for any species in its genus.

Omura's whale seen off New Caledonia, the Solomon Islands, West Sumatra, and East Kalimantan showed extensive scarring from cookiecutter shark bites, indicating they had ventured into deep waters; whereas those off Madagascar did not exhibit them.

=== Morphometrics ===
The rostrum is flat and V-shaped with the head occupying about a quarter of the body length. The pectoral fins are short but slender, being from about 13 to 15 per cent of the body length. The dorsal fin ranges between 7.5 and 20 cm (3.0 and 7.9 in) in height and 18 to 60 cm (7 to 23.5 in) in length for specimens 3.9 to 7.15 m (12.8 to 23.5 ft) in length, and is placed about 57 per cent of the body length back from the tip of the rostrum. It is 61.5 per cent of the body length from the tip of the lower jaw to the umbilicus, whereas it is about 63 per cent from the tip of the lower jaw to the end of the ventral grooves. The flukes are about a quarter to a fifth of the body length in width.

=== Size ===
Omura's whale is among the smallest of the rorquals – only the two species of minke whale, the common and Antarctic, which reach 9.75 and 10.7 m (32.0 and 35.1 ft) in length, respectively, are smaller. Of the eight specimens taken during Japanese whaling in the Indo-Pacific, the five females ranged in length from 10.1 to 11.5 m (33.1 to 37.7 ft), while the three males ranged from 9.6 to 10.0 m (31.5 to 32.8 ft). The females ranged in age from perhaps only 9 years (the earplug was damaged or partially lost) for an 11.2 m (36.7 ft) individual to 29 years for the longest female, whereas the three males ranged from perhaps 21 years (another damaged or partially lost earplug) for the longest male to 38 years for one of the 9.6 m (31.5 ft) specimens. All were physically mature with the exception of the smallest female. Of individuals found stranded in Taiwan and Thailand between 1983 and 2004, five males ranged in length from 5.13 to 10 m (16.8 to 32.8 ft), while two females were 4.3 and 5.95 m (14.1 and 19.5 ft), respectively – a specimen of unknown sex that stranded in 1983 in Phuket Province, Thailand, was 7 m (23.0 ft) in length.

Of 16 "Bryde's whales" caught by hunters from Pamilacan between 1991 and 1993, 12 were measured. These cluster into two size categories, nine whales less than 10 m (32.8 ft), and three 12 m (39.4 ft) or more. Later, 85% (24 of 28) of the identified skull specimens examined from the Bohol Sea were found to be Omura's whales, whereas only 15% (4 of 28) were what was tentatively called the Indo-Pacific form of Bryde's whale (B. brydei). The former size category may be primarily (if not entirely) Omura's whale, whereas the larger whales – one of unknown sex of 12 m (39.4 ft) and two females of 13 m (42.7 ft) – would be the larger, offshore form of Bryde's whale. Of those smaller whales, four males ranged from 6.7 to 9.8 m (22.0 to 32.2 ft), four females ranged from 4.9 to 9.3 m (16.1 to 30.5 ft), and one of unknown sex was 9.4 m (30.8 ft).

Lone individuals seen off Madagascar were estimated to range between 8 and 12 m (26 and 39 ft), while calves were estimated to be between 3 and 5 m (9.8 and 16.4 ft).

The identity of three mature specimens (two females and a male) examined by biologist Graham Chittleborough in 1958 at a whaling station in Western Australia, which ranged in length from 10.6 to 11.74 m (34.8 to 38.5 ft), is uncertain – they may refer to Omura's whale or the smaller form of Bryde's whale (B. edeni). These three individuals were noted to have very small baleen plates – about 22 by 15 cm (8.7 by 5.9 in), about 22 by 16 cm (8.7 by 6.3 in), and 23.5 by 17.5 cm (9.3 by 6.9 in), respectively – with length-breadth quotients of 1.34 to 1.46, within the upper range (1.00-1.43) of the 9 specimens included in the formal description of Omura's whale, but also within the lower range of the Bryde's whale complex (1.2 to 1.33). The holotype of the smaller form of Bryde's whale (B. edeni) from Myanmar, though, had baleen plates of 30 by 15 cm (11.8 by 5.9 in), or a length-breadth quotient of exactly 2.0 – within the typical range of the Bryde's whale complex (1.8 to 2.4).

=== Mating ===
Of the three females caught in the Solomon Sea, two were ovulating and lactating and one was resting (not lactating, ovulating, or pregnant), while one of the two females caught near the Cocos Islands was accompanied by a calf estimated to be about 3 m (9.8 ft) in length. Nothing is known of the duration of gestation and lactation, and little is known of the timing or extent of breeding seasons. In August 2005, a 3.2 m (10 ft) female neonate with fetal folds and folded dorsal fin and flukes stranded at Miyazaki, Miyazaki Prefecture, on the eastern coast of Kyushu. Off northwestern Madagascar, six different cow-calf pairs were seen: one in August 2011, three in November 2013, and two in August 2015, suggesting a protracted calving season. The three calves observed in November had bent dorsal fins (indicating that they were fairly young) but did not have fetal folds, while one of the calves sighted in August had an erect dorsal fin, indicating that it was older but still probably born that year. These calves were estimated to range in length from 3 to 5 m (9.8 to 16.4 ft).

== Behavior and diet ==
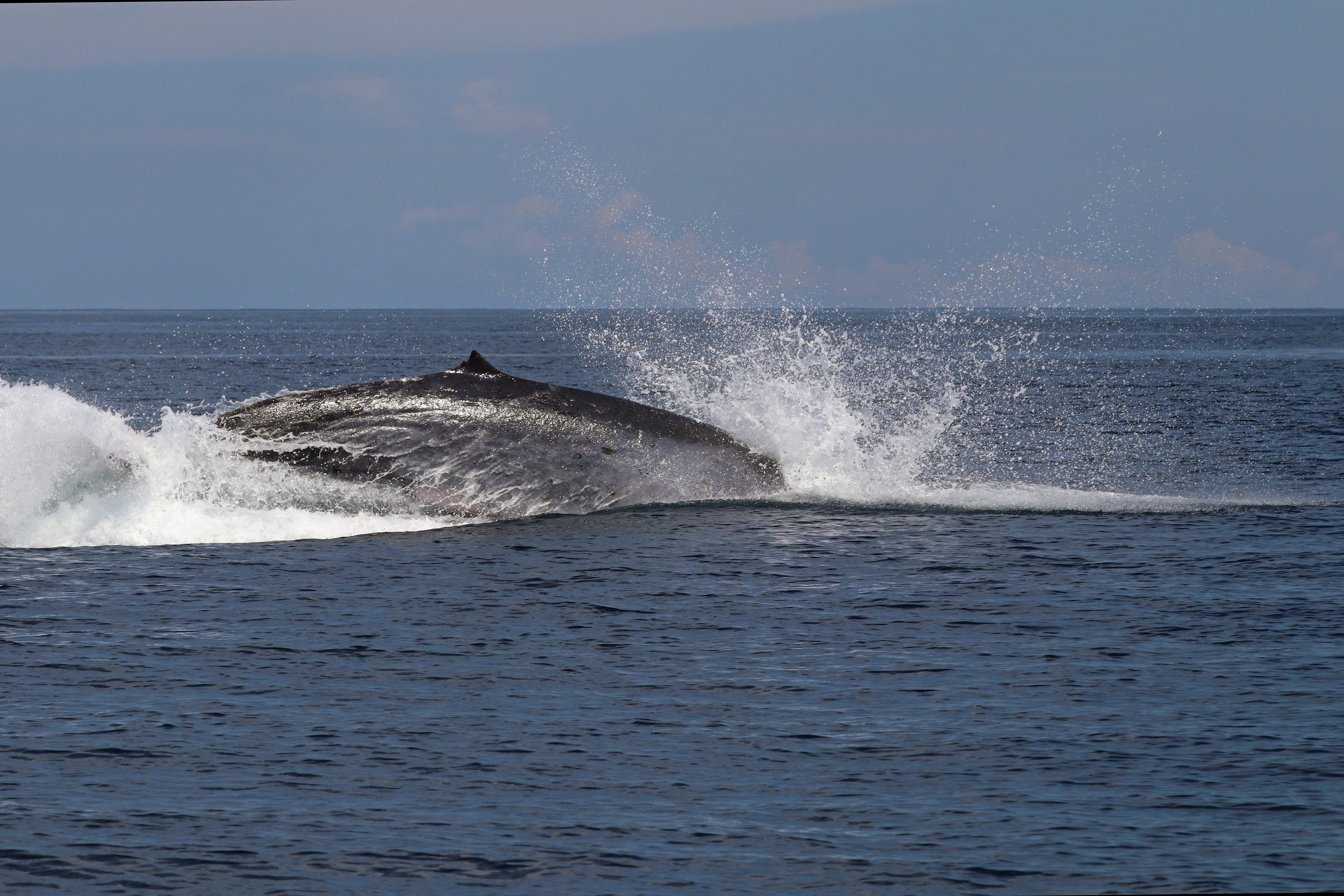
Breaching off Nosy Be, Madagascar

Little is known of the behavior and diet of Omura's whale. Their blow is low and diffuse. After surfacing, the dorsal fin is usually not visible until after the head and splashguard have disappeared and they do not fluke when diving. They have been seen lunge feeding, defecating, and breaching off both Komodo National Park and northwestern Madagascar; they've also been seen rolling at the surface in apparent mating (the last of which allowed the identification of a male) off the former area. Off Madagascar, average group size was only 1.1 individuals (272 individuals in 247 groups), but loose aggregations of as many as a dozen whales could be seen. A total of thirteen cow-calf pairs were observed between 2011 and 2016, including a female first seen in an aggregation in 2012, then with a calf in 2013, and alone again in 2015 and 2017, showing that individuals can exhibit strong site fidelity.

The six paratypes taken in the Solomon Sea in 1976 reportedly only had krill (Euphausia diomedeae) in their stomachs, while crustaceans and fish were found in a 7 m (23 ft) female from Japan. Individuals in Madagascar have been observed lunge feeding on the krill Pseudeuphausia latifrons.

=== Song ===
Omura's whale produce amplitude-modulated songs of 15-50 Hz with a peak frequency of 36.1 Hz and an average duration of 9.2 seconds. This is sometimes followed by a tonal call of 17 Hz and four seconds in duration. These songs are repeated every two to three minutes, sometimes for as long as thirteen hours. Songs have been recorded off northwest Madagascar year-round, with peak activity from late October to late January and again from late May to late June. Overlapping choruses of several singing individuals have been recorded throughout the year as well.

=== Movements ===
Four Omura's whales were satellite-tagged off northwest Madagascar in November 2016. The tags stayed on an average of 42 days (range: 30–58 days). The tagged whales traveled an average of 2,530 km (range: 2,148 to 3,181 km) but remained within a small coastal range of only 230 to 405 km (average: 283 km) off the northwest coast of the island. All whales traversed their entire individual ranges several times, spending most of their time on shelf waters and rarely venturing into deep waters.

== Range ==
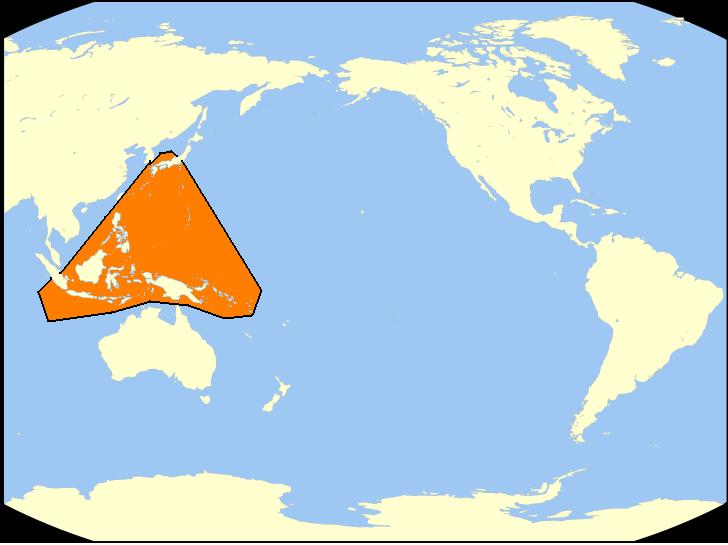
Distribution in western Pacific Ocean

Omura's whale are found in the Indo-Pacific and the Atlantic Oceans, primarily in shelf waters between 35° N and 35° S, with the majority of records in the tropics (between 23° 26' N and 23° 26' S). Their range includes southern Japan (with strandings and entanglements recorded in March and from May to October; including the prefectures of Yamaguchi, Miyazaki, Kagawa, Mie, Shizuoka, and Chiba), South Korea (December to January, from the provinces of South Jeolla and South Gyeongsang), China (with strandings from November to February and in August; including the provinces of Zhejiang, Fujian, Guangdong, and Guangxi), Taiwan (with strandings from November to March and in May; there are also sightings from April to May and July to August), Hong Kong (March), the Philippines (Manila Bay, Busuanga, and the Bohol Sea), Vietnam (Quảng Ngãi Province), Malaysia (Pahang), Thailand (with sightings and strandings from February, May to June, and November to December; including the provinces of Phang Nga, Phuket, Prachuap Khiri Khan, and Songkhla), Indonesia (with sightings and strandings from February, April to June, and from September to November; with records from West Sumatra, the southern Java Sea, Bali, Komodo, the Solor Archipelago, Seram, Raja Ampat Islands, and East Kalimantan), the Cocos (Keeling) Islands, the Andaman Islands (April), Australia (Western Australia from Exmouth to north of Darwin in the Northern Territory at about 9° 30' S - 10° S, 130° E), South Australia (January, Gulf St Vincent), Queensland (November to December, Port Douglas and Mission Beach), the Solomon Islands, New Caledonia, Sri Lanka (February), the Chagos Archipelago, Iran (September, Strait of Hormuz), Egypt (April, the northern Red Sea) northwestern Madagascar (12° 01' S to 19° 23' S, with sightings by researchers from August and October to December, by whale watch operators from April to December, and acoustically detected year-round), Mauritania (November, Trarza Region), Brazil (September, Ceará), and in the vicinity of the Saint Peter and Saint Paul Archipelago.

=== Sightings ===
In 1999 and 2000, an unidentified species of rorqual was repeatedly seen in the waters of Komodo National Park. They were small (most estimated to be only 7 to 10 m (23 to 33 ft) in length) with asymmetrical coloration similar to the fin whale, only had a single prominent ridge on the rostrum, and an extremely hooked dorsal fin. At first, they were tentatively identified as a "pygmy or regionally distinct" form of Bryde's whale, which was confirmed when one was photographed and biopsied in October 2000 and its tissue sample sent to the Southwest Fisheries Science Center in La Jolla, California. There, its DNA was analyzed and found to be a complete match with a "pygmy Bryde's" sample obtained from the Philippines – later, however, it was discovered samples from the Philippines corresponded to B. omurai and not B. edeni.

During marine mammal surveys conducted in the Solomon Islands in 2009 and 2010, what were "most likely" Omura's whales were sighted on three occasions. They were estimated to be 6 to 10 m (20 to 33 ft) in length and lacked obvious auxiliary ridges. The sightings were made very close to shore (within a few hundred meters), one on the west coast of Malaita in November 2009, one on the northwest coast of Guadalcanal in November 2010, and a pair observed feeding within the Sandfly Passage of the Florida Islands on 14 November 2010.

In October 2015, an international team of scientists, led by Salvatore Cerchio of the New England Aquarium and Woods Hole Oceanographic Institution, released the first images and field observations of the species from a population off northwestern Madagascar. Forty-four sightings of Omura's whale were made between 2011 and 2014, with the majority in 2013 (thirteen) and 2014 (twenty-five). Forty-two were made off Nosy Iranja and the Ampasindava Peninsula, while only two occurred off Nosy Be. They were observed in open shelf waters that averaged 31 m (102 ft) deep (range: 4 to 202 m, or 13.1 to 662 ft) and were never seen in deep waters off the shelf break or in shallower coastal waters or embayments.

In 2018, Pierre Laboute and Philippe Borsa published a paper on sightings of Omura's whale made off Nosy Be in 1991–1995, 1998, and 2000, including photographs of an aggregation of a dozen whales seen skim and lunge feeding in 40 to 80 m (130 to 260 ft) of water in November 1994 at 13° 26' S, 48° 05' E.

In 2017, the first confirmed live sightings of Omura's whale were made off Taiwan and Sri Lanka.

On December 31, 2023, tourists on a charter boat off Phuket's coast in the Andaman Sea captured a pair of Omura's whales with a drone, one of which was an exceptionally rare all-white Omura whale.

== Hunting and other mortality ==
=== Artisanal whaling ===
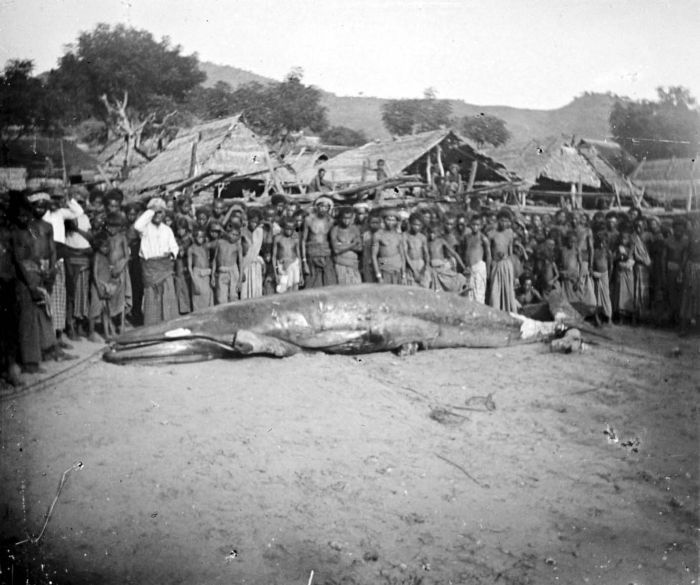
Photograph showing a small rorqual taken by villagers of Lamakera between 1915 and 1944. This is thought to likely be an Omura's whale (see text).

As early as the late 19th century, the natives of Lila, Bohol, began hunting whales in the Bohol Sea. By the turn of the century, this had spread to nearby Pamilacan Island and later to Sagay, Camiguin. At Pamilacan, whales were caught as early as January and as late as June, but most were taken in April and May. When a whale was spotted from shore, between 10 and 20 pump boats (boats with motors originally used for pumps) were launched in chase. When within range, a "hookman" jumped onto the whale's head and stabbed it with a 35-cm-long, 22.5-cm-wide stainless steel hook attached to a heavy line of 30 m (98 ft) with a 2 m (6.6 ft) bamboo spar buoy at the end of it. At Camiguin, they harpooned it with a toggle-headed grommet harpoon with a 2.5 m (8.2 ft) wooden shaft similar to the "dolphin irons" used by American whalemen in the mid-19th century, which in turn was either attached to a 140 m (460 ft) rope with a plastic fishing float or a 400 m (1,300 ft) rope with a plastic float or oil drum at the end. After an hour or more, the whale tired, and men took turns cutting it until it died. The boats usually towed the carcass to Lila for butchering, where it was sold and the meat eaten raw or cooked. Pamilacan hunters alone caught 10 to 20 per year, whereas at Camiguin, they caught them only sporadically.

When Maria Louella L. Dolar and colleagues (1994) examined photographs or baleen of the whales caught in the Bohol Sea between 1991 and 1993, they identified them as Bryde's whales; this was supported by osteological examinations of skulls collected from the same sites by Dolar, William F. Perrin, and others (1996), who suggested they were a "small form" of Bryde's whale. The specimens were deposited in the collections of the Marine Research Laboratory of Silliman University in Dumaguete, Negros Oriental, Philippines, where they were examined by T. K. Yamada and co-workers (2008). They discovered that 24 of the skulls were actually from Omura's whales, whereas only four were from the Indo-Pacific Bryde's whale (B. brydei). This was supported by genetic studies, which found that, based on comparison of published phylogenies, the small "Bryde's whales" from the Philippines correspond to Omura's whale.

A monograph from 1923 describes three skulls of balaenopterids taken by native whalers in Indonesia. Later examination of photographs of those skulls by one of the scientists (Tadasu K. Yamada) that had formally described Omura's whale showed that two of them, one from Bangsri, Java, and another from Lamakera, Solor, belonged to B. omurai. There is also a photograph (taken between 1915 and 1944) of a whale caught by the villagers of Lamakera that "strongly resembles a young Omura's whale in size and shape".

Remains of Omura's whales have been found in whale temples along the coast of Vietnam.

=== Scientific whaling ===
Of the eight individuals taken by Japanese scientific whaling in the 1970s, six were processed aboard the factory ship Tonan Maru No. 2 in the Solomon Sea (9°49'-10°17'S, 157°29'-157°56'E) on 24 October 1976, and two were processed aboard the factory ship Nisshin Maru No. 3 near the Cocos Islands (10°51′S 97°02′E and 10°53′S 94°29′E, respectively) on 15 and 17 November 1978.

=== Bycatch ===
Three of the seven records from Japan involve bycaught individuals, including a 9.2 m (30 ft) male in Sagami Bay in October 2003, a 10.05 m (33.0 ft) female in Tokyo Bay in May 2004, and a 6.3 m (21 ft) female near Ise Bay in March 2012. Both records from South Korea were individuals taken as bycatch, including a 6.3 m (21 ft) female off Geoje in January 2004 and a 6.4 m (21 ft) male off Goheung in December 2006. A 4.4 m (14 ft) male calf was also caught in small-mesh herring seine nets in the Gulf of Thailand, Songkhla Province, in May 2011, while a 7.5 m (25 ft) whale (thought to likely be an Omura's whale) was caught in fishing gear off Negombo, Sri Lanka, in August 1985. A live whale seen off Sri Lanka in 2017 also had a scar on its rostrum suggestive of an entanglement with fishing gear.

=== Ship strikes ===
Two individuals of Omura's whale were victims of ship strike, including the holotype of the species, an 11 m (36 ft) female found off Tsunoshima in the Sea of Japan in September 1998, and a whale brought into Manila Bay on the bow of a ship.

== Conservation ==
Omura's whale is listed on Appendix II of the Convention on the Conservation of Migratory Species of Wild Animals. It is listed on Appendix II as it has an unfavourable conservation status or would benefit significantly from international co-operation organised by tailored agreements.

In addition, Omura's whale is covered by the Memorandum of Understanding for the Conservation of Cetaceans and Their Habitats in the Pacific Islands Region (Pacific Cetaceans MOU).

== See also ==
- List of cetaceans
