= Nematobrachion =

Scientific classification
- Domain: Eukaryota
- Kingdom: Animalia
- Phylum: Arthropoda
- Class: Malacostraca
- Order: Euphausiacea
- Family: Euphausiidae
- Genus: Nematobrachion; Calman, 1905

Species
- See text

Genus of krill

Nematobrachion is a genus of krill, containing the following three species:

- Nematobrachion boopis (Calman, 1896)
- Nematobrachion flexipes (Ortmann, 1893)
- Nematobrachion sexspinosum Hansen, 1911
