= Cryptocheiridium elegans =

Scientific classification
- Kingdom: Animalia
- Phylum: Arthropoda
- Subphylum: Chelicerata
- Class: Arachnida
- Order: Pseudoscorpiones
- Family: Cheiridiidae
- Genus: Cryptocheiridium
- Species: C. elegans

Binomial name
- Cryptocheiridium elegans (Dumitresco & Orghidan, 1981)

Synonyms
- Cryptocheiridium (Cubanocheiridium) elegans Dumitresco and Orghidon, 1981; Cubanocheiridium elegans Dumitresco and Orghidon, 1981

Species of pseudoscorpion

Cryptocheiridium elegans is a species of pseudoscorpions in the family Cheiridiidae. It is found in Cuba.
