= Tessarabrachion =

Scientific classification
- Domain: Eukaryota
- Kingdom: Animalia
- Phylum: Arthropoda
- Class: Malacostraca
- Order: Euphausiacea
- Family: Euphausiidae
- Genus: Tessarabrachion; Hansen, 1911
- Species: T. oculatum

Binomial name
- Tessarabrachion oculatum Hansen, 1911

Genus of krill

Tessarabrachion is a monotypic genus of species of krill, containing only the species Tessarabrachion oculatum.
