= Cryptocheiridium australicum =

Scientific classification
- Kingdom: Animalia
- Phylum: Arthropoda
- Subphylum: Chelicerata
- Class: Arachnida
- Order: Pseudoscorpiones
- Family: Cheiridiidae
- Genus: Cryptocheiridium
- Species: C. australicum

Binomial name
- Cryptocheiridium australicum Beier, 1969

Species of pseudoscorpion

Cryptocheiridium australicum is a species of pseudoscorpion in the Cheiridiidae family. It was described in 1969 by Austrian arachnologist Max Beier.

== Distribution and habitat ==
The species occurs in south-east Western Australia. The type locality is Murra El Elevyn Cave, near Cocklebiddy on the Nullarbor Plain.

== Behaviour ==
The pseudoscorpions are cave-dwelling, terrestrial predators.
