= Hypocyphtini =

Scientific classification
- Kingdom: Animalia
- Phylum: Arthropoda
- Clade: Pancrustacea
- Class: Insecta
- Order: Coleoptera
- Suborder: Polyphaga
- Infraorder: Staphyliniformia
- Family: Staphylinidae
- Subfamily: Aleocharinae
- Tribe: Hypocyphtini; Laporte de Castelnau, 1835

Tribe of beetles

Hypocyphtini is a tribe of rove beetles in the subfamily Aleocharinae. It was first described by Laporte de Castelnau in 1835. It contains 11 genera with 291 accepted species. The majority of recorded observations of members of Hypocyphtini have been made in Sweden, the United Kingdom, Portugal, France, and Norway. Observations are made year-round, and peak during June.

== Genera ==
- Akanthoystera
- Baltioligota
- Cypha
- Holobus
- Liophaena
- Microtachyporus
- Nematoscelis
- Neodecusa
- Oligota
- Paracyptus
- Typhlocyptus
