= Bellinge =

Bellinge may refer to:

- Bellinge, an area in Billing, Northamptonshire, England
- Bellinge, Denmark, a village in Odense, Denmark
