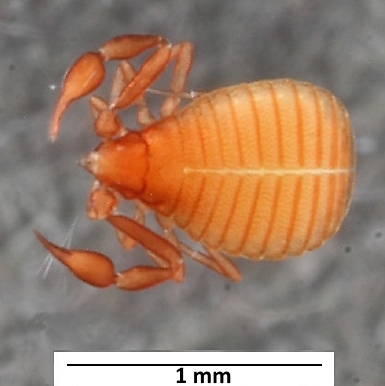
- Cheiridium museorum

Scientific classification
- Kingdom: Animalia
- Phylum: Arthropoda
- Subphylum: Chelicerata
- Class: Arachnida
- Order: Pseudoscorpiones
- Family: Cheiridiidae
- Genus: Cheiridium; Menge, 1855

= Cheiridium =

Genus of arachnids

Cheiridium is a genus of pseudoscorpions belonging to the family Cheiridiidae.

The genus was first described by Menge in 1855.

The species of this genus are found in Europe and North America.

Species:

- Cheiridium museorum (Leach, 1817)
- Cheiridium piracanjubae Bedoya-Roqueme, Silva dos Reis, de Freitas Barroso & Tizo-Pedroso, 2023
