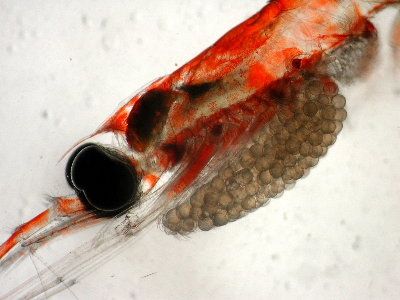
- The head of a female Hansarsia difficilis with her brood sac

Scientific classification
- Kingdom: Animalia
- Phylum: Arthropoda
- Class: Malacostraca
- Order: Euphausiacea
- Family: Euphausiidae
- Genus: Hansarsia; Shaw, 2023

Species
- See text

Synonyms
- Nematoscelis G. O. Sars, 1883 (Preoccupied)

= Hansarsia =

Genus of krill

Hansarsia is a genus of krill, formerly known by the name Nematoscelis (e.g.), a junior homonym.

== Species ==
- Hansarsia atlantica (Hansen, 1910)
- Hansarsia difficilis (Hansen, 1911)
- Hansarsia einarssoni Kulagin, Simakova, Lunina & Vereshchaka, 2024
- Hansarsia gracilis (Hansen, 1910)
- Hansarsia lobata (Hansen, 1916)
- Hansarsia megalops (G.O. Sars, 1883)
- Hansarsia microps (G.O. Sars, 1883)
- Hansarsia tenella (G.O. Sars, 1883)
