= Pseudeuphausia =

Scientific classification
- Domain: Eukaryota
- Kingdom: Animalia
- Phylum: Arthropoda
- Class: Malacostraca
- Order: Euphausiacea
- Family: Euphausiidae
- Genus: Pseudeuphausia; Hansen, 1910

Genus of krill

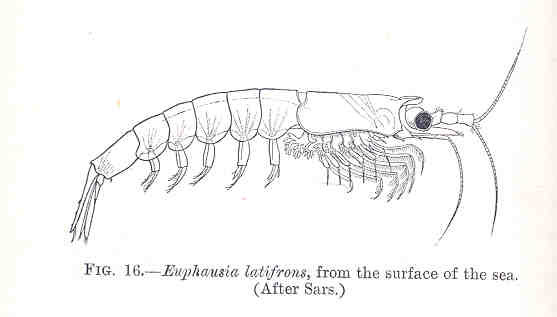
Euphausia latifrons, from the surface of the sea. (After Sars.)

Pseudeuphausia is a genus of krill (small marine crustaceans) comprising two species:

- Pseudeuphausia latifrons (G. O. Sars, 1883)
- Pseudeuphausia sinica Wang & Chen, 1963
