= Stylocheiron =

Scientific classification
- Domain: Eukaryota
- Kingdom: Animalia
- Phylum: Arthropoda
- Class: Malacostraca
- Order: Euphausiacea
- Family: Euphausiidae
- Genus: Stylocheiron; G. O. Sars, 1883

Species
- See text

Genus of krill

Stylocheiron is a genus of krill, containing the following species:

- Stylocheiron abbreviatum G. O. Sars, 1883
- Stylocheiron affine Hansen, 1910
- Stylocheiron armatum Colosi, 1917
- Stylocheiron carinatum G. O. Sars, 1883
- Stylocheiron elongatum G. O. Sars, 1883
- Stylocheiron indicum Silas & Mathew, 1967
- Stylocheiron insulare Hansen, 1910
- Stylocheiron longicorne G. O. Sars, 1883
- Stylocheiron maximum Hansen, 1908
- Stylocheiron microphthalma Hansen, 1910
- Stylocheiron robustum Brinton, 1962
- Stylocheiron suhmi G. O. Sars, 1883
