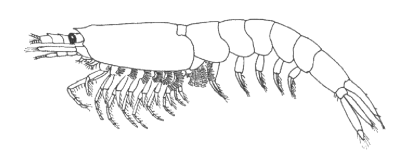
- after Mauchline, 1971; after Sars, 1885

Scientific classification
- Kingdom: Animalia
- Phylum: Arthropoda
- Class: Malacostraca
- Order: Euphausiacea
- Family: Bentheuphausiidae; Colosi, 1917
- Genus: Bentheuphausia; G. O. Sars, 1885
- Species: B. amblyops

Binomial name
- Bentheuphausia amblyops (G. O. Sars, 1883)

Synonyms
- Thysanopoda amblyops G. O. Sars, 1883

= Bentheuphausia =

Genus of krill

Bentheuphausia amblyops, the deep sea krill is a species of krill. B. amblyops is the only species within its genus, which in turn is the only genus within the family Bentheuphausiidae. All the 85 other species of krill known are classified in the family Euphausiidae.

== Distribution ==
B. amblyops occurs in the northern Atlantic Ocean in latitudes south of 40° N, and also in the southern seas of the Atlantic, in the Indian Ocean and in the Pacific. It is a bathypelagic krill that lives in deep waters below 1,000 metres (3,300 ft).

== Description ==
It is distinguished from the Euphausiidae by several morphological features, the most apparent being that they are not bioluminescent and that their first pair of pleopods is not modified as copulatory tool organs. Also, their eyes are smaller than those of the Euphausiidae. Adults reach a length of 4 to 5 centimetres (1.6 to 2.0 in).
