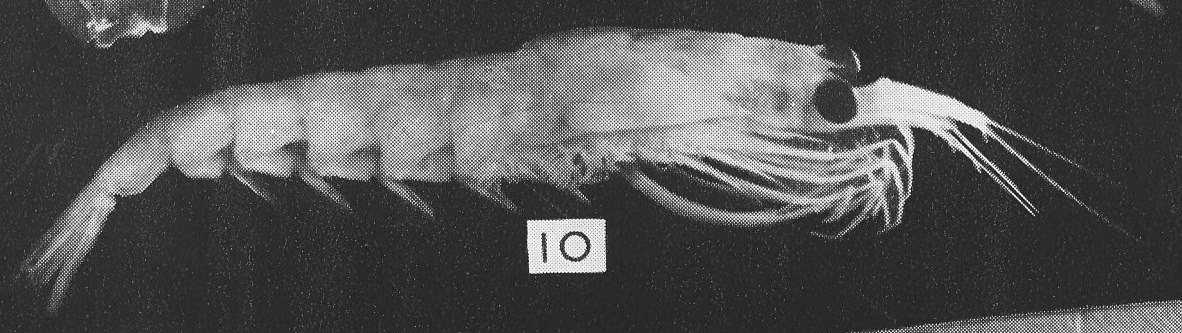
- Nyctiphanes australis

Scientific classification
- Domain: Eukaryota
- Kingdom: Animalia
- Phylum: Arthropoda
- Class: Malacostraca
- Order: Euphausiacea
- Family: Euphausiidae
- Genus: Nyctiphanes; G. O. Sars, 1883

Species
- Nyctiphanes australis G. O. Sars, 1883; Nyctiphanes capensis Hansen, 1911; Nyctiphanes couchii (Bell, 1853); Nyctiphanes simplex Hansen, 1911

= Nyctiphanes =

Genus of krill

Nyctiphanes is a genus of krill, comprising four species with an anti-tropical distribution. Based on molecular phylogenetic analyses of the cytochrome oxidase gene and 16S ribosomal DNA, Nyctiphanes is believed to have evolved during the Miocene.
