= Cryptocheiridium =

Scientific classification
- Kingdom: Animalia
- Phylum: Arthropoda
- Subphylum: Chelicerata
- Class: Arachnida
- Order: Pseudoscorpiones
- Family: Cheiridiidae
- Genus: Cryptocheiridium; Chamberlin, 1931

Type species
- Cheiridium subtropicum Tullgren, 1907

Genus of pseudoscorpions

Cryptocheiridium is a genus of pseudoscorpions in the Cheiridiidae family. It was described in 1931 by American arachnologist Joseph Conrad Chamberlin.

== Species ==
The genus contains the following species:

- Cryptocheiridium australicum Beier, 1969
- Cryptocheiridium confundens Mahnert, 2014
- Cryptocheiridium elegans Dumitresco & Orghidan, 1981
- Cryptocheiridium elgonense Beier, 1955
- Cryptocheiridium formosanum (Ellingsen, 1912)
- Cryptocheiridium insulare (Vitali-di Castri, 1984)
- Cryptocheiridium kivuense Beier, 1959
- Cryptocheiridium lucifugum Beier, 1963
- Cryptocheiridium mairae Bedoya, Bedoya & Quiros, 2015
- Cryptocheiridium philippinum Beier, 1977
- Cryptocheiridium salomonense Beier, 1970
- Cryptocheiridium somalicum Callaini, 1985
- Cryptocheiridium subtropicum (Tullgren, 1907)

=== Fossil species ===
- †Cryptocheiridium antiquum Schawaller, 1981
