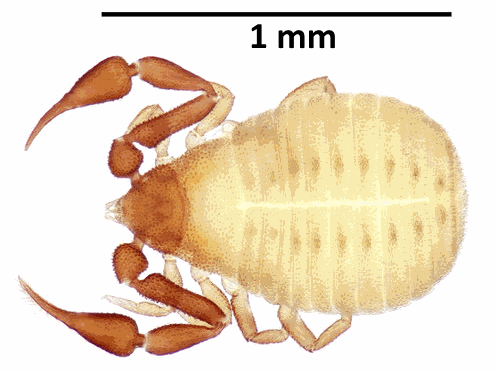
- Apocheiridium ferum

Scientific classification
- Kingdom: Animalia
- Phylum: Arthropoda
- Subphylum: Chelicerata
- Class: Arachnida
- Order: Pseudoscorpiones
- Family: Cheiridiidae
- Genus: Apocheiridium; Chamberlin, 1924

= Apocheiridium =

Genus of pseudoscorpions

Apocheiridium is a genus of pseudoscorpions belonging to the family Cheiridiidae.

The species of this genus are found in Europe and Australia.

Species:

- Apocheiridium asperum Beier, 1964
- Apocheiridium bulbifemorum Benedict, 1978
