= Thysanopoda =

Scientific classification
- Kingdom: Animalia
- Phylum: Arthropoda
- Clade: Pancrustacea
- Class: Malacostraca
- Order: Euphausiacea
- Family: Euphausiidae
- Genus: Thysanopoda; Latreille, 1831

Species
- Several, see text

Genus of krill

Thysanopoda is a genus of krill, containing the following species:

- Thysanopoda acutifrons Holt & Tattersall, 1905
- Thysanopoda aequalis Hansen, 1905
- Thysanopoda astylata Brinton, 1975
- Thysanopoda cornuta Illig, 1905
- Thysanopoda cristata G. O. Sars, 1883
- Thysanopoda egregia Hansen, 1905
- Thysanopoda elongata Guérin-Méneville, 1844
- Thysanopoda microphthalma G. O. Sars, 1885
- Thysanopoda minyops Brinton, 1987
- Thysanopoda monacantha Ortmann, 1893
- Thysanopoda obtusifrons G. O. Sars, 1883
- Thysanopoda orientalis Hansen, 1910
- Thysanopoda pectinata Ortmann, 1893
- Thysanopoda spinicaudata Brinton, 1953
- Thysanopoda tricuspidata Milne-Edwards, 1837
