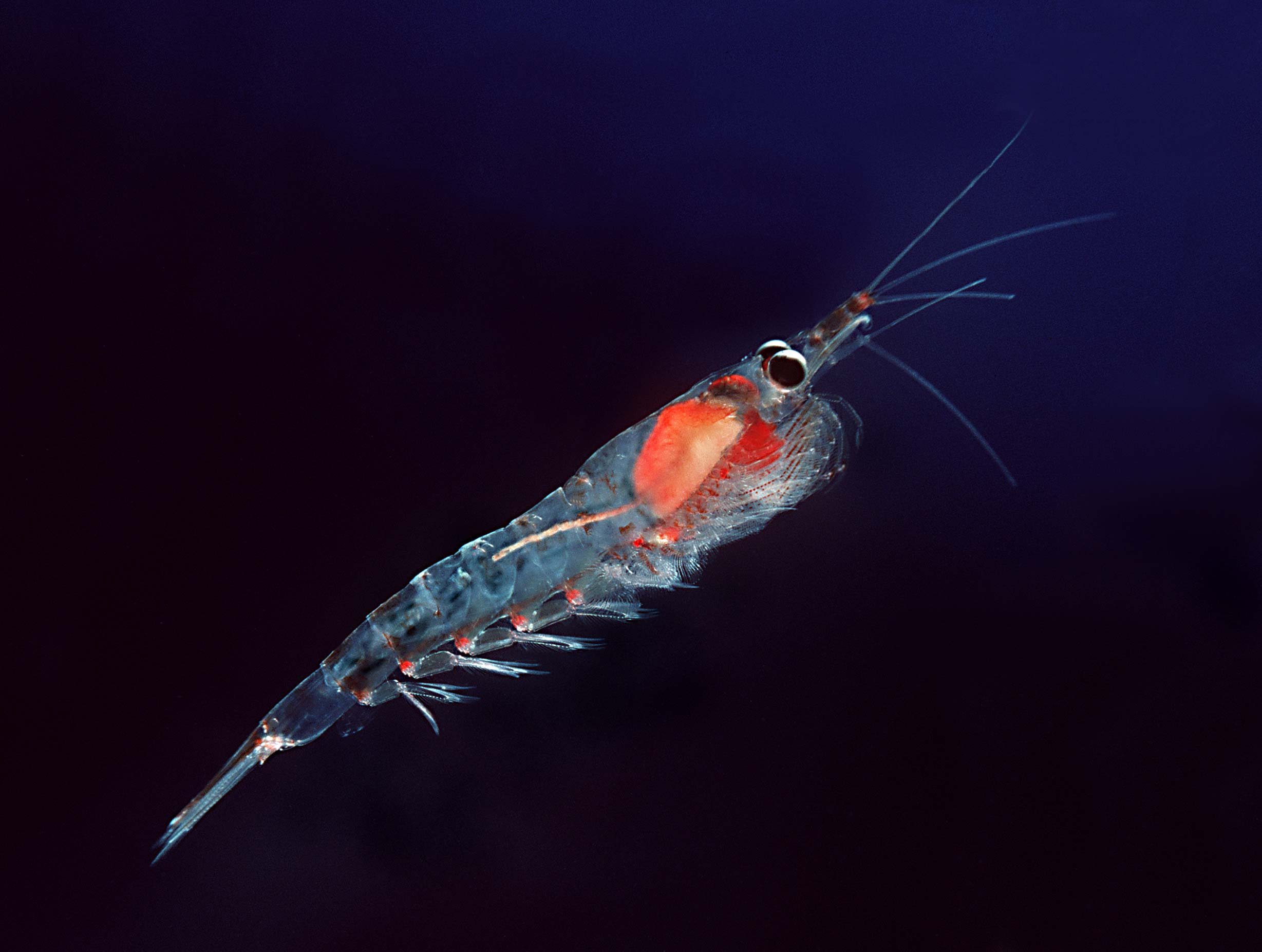

Scientific classification
- Kingdom: Animalia
- Phylum: Arthropoda
- Clade: Pancrustacea
- Class: Malacostraca
- Order: Euphausiacea
- Family: Euphausiidae
- Genus: Meganyctiphanes; Holt & Tattersall, 1905
- Species: M. norvegica

Binomial name
- Meganyctiphanes norvegica (M. Sars, 1857)

Synonyms
- Euphausia intermedia; Euphausia lanei Holt & Tattersall, 1905; Meganyctiphanes calmani; Nyctiphanes norvegicus G. O. Sars, 1883; Thysanopoda norvegica

= Northern krill =

Species of krill

The northern krill (Meganyctiphanes norvegica) is a species of krill that lives in the North Atlantic Ocean including the Norwegian Sea, North Sea, and parts of the Mediterranean. The thermal tolerance in this specie ranges from 2 - 15 °C which stands out compared to other krill species. For example, the Antarctic krill (Euphausia superba), by contrast, tolerates temperatures between -2 and +4 °C. The northern krill is an important component of the zooplankton, providing food for whales, seals, fish, and birds. In the Southern Ocean, Antarctic krill fills a similar role. M. norvegica is the only species recognized in the genus Meganyctiphanes.

Northern krill supply a crucial link in the North Atlantic Ocean food web, transmitting energy from primary producers to high-level predators. Krill in the North Atlantic Oceans feed on phytoplankton, copepods, and other zooplankton.

== Anatomy and morphology ==
=== External morphology ===
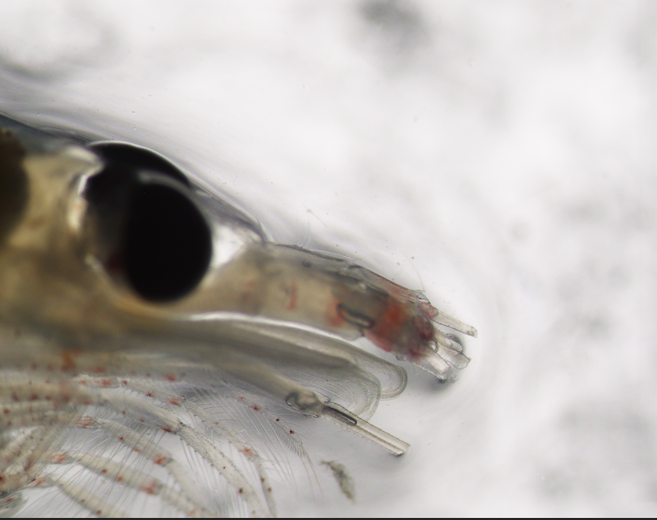
Cephalothorax of a northern krill showing its compound eyes and two antenna

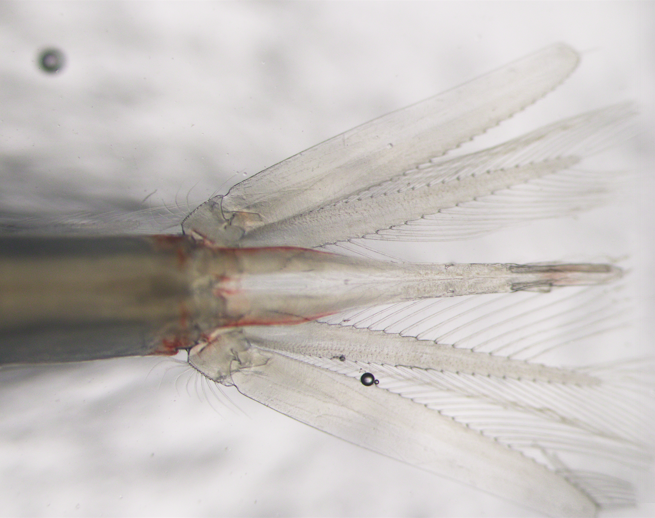
Small but powerful tail fin and transparent chitinous exoskeleton.

Similar to all krill species, northern krill are crustaceans that possess a transparent chitinous exoskeleton. Northern krill can grow up to 4-6 centimeters long in adult hood, although on average they are 1.5–2 centimeters. Their anatomy is a decapod consisting of three main sections: the cephalothorax, the abdomen, and the tail fan. The cephalothorax is the krill's head which houses two antenna and compound eyes. Northern krill utilize their antenna to sense their surroundings and aiding in eating feed. In addition to the northern krill's antenna they also have maxillipeds which aid them in handling food to their mandible. Found in insects, krill also operate through compound eyes which allows them to see a large array of area, detect rapid movement, and see in deep sea light conditions. Krill’s compound eyes contain opsins. The number and types of opsins vary between species. This feature may help them to distinguish subtle differences within the blue-green spectrum of light and to adapt better to local lighting conditions. Northern krill also possess mandibles and maxillipeds which aid them in eating.

Attached to the cephalothorax is the abdomen which contains ten appendages to aid with swimming. These appendages are five pairs of forked non walking legs referred to as pleopods or "swimmerets". Unique to a standard decapod krill use their pleopods for more than just swimming incorporating them into how they groom and eat. Their tail fan assists the northern krill to propel forward when swimming.

=== Internal Anatomy ===
Northern krill are adapted for survival in the pelagic zone of the ocean, enabling them to feed, escape predators, and reproduce.

==== Digestive System ====
The northern krill's digestive system starts at their maxillipeds which files food into their mouths which leads to the esophagus. The esophagus is connected to their stomach which consists of a cardiac stomach and a pyloric stomach. Their cardiac stomach is the initial part of the stomach which helps grind the krill's food. The pyloric stomach is located in the lower stomach region which directs movement of their food into the small intestine. The northern krill's pyloric stomach allows any bacteria to be passed right through the stomach due to the fast turnover rate. The food moves through the intestines located through the abdomen, leading to the anus to discrete the food particles.

==== Circulatory System ====
The northern krill's circulatory system is open. An open circulatory system is where the krill's form of blood hemolymph soaks the organs directly. The tissue fluid is mixed with the hemolymph. Northern krill have a small heart located on the back or dorsal side. This dorsal heart pumps the blood through the krill's arteries.

==== Respiratory System ====
Northern krill do not breathe oxygen from the atmosphere, instead breathing oxygen present in water. Krill use their gills located on their pleopod appendages attached to their abdomen to exhale and respire. Once krill breathe in the oxygen can be seen circulating throughout their body via respiratory pigment. Respiratory pigment is the term used when referring to a protein that transports oxygen into the blood and tissues. In northern krill, the respiratory pigment is called hemocyanin. Unlike hemoglobin, hemocyanin is susceptible to change due to temperature and has a weak affinity for oxygen. Due to their low affinity for oxygen, krill's respiration rate changes in response to temperature changes. This makes northern krill more susceptible to death with fluctuations in temperature and oxygenation levels.

==== Photophores ====
Not only do northern krill possess a transparent chitinous exoskeleton, but they also have bioluminescent organs. Found in many fish these bioluminescent organs otherwise known as photophores are hypothesized to help the krill camouflage and communicate. Photophores are organs that emit light. On krill, they are located on the eyestalks, ventral thorax, and abdomen. They are often attributed to aiding in luring prey and male intrasexual competition. Their transparent body and bioluminescent organs help northern krill evade predators. These light-emitting organs work by being catalyzed by an enzyme luciferase. Krill can adjust and control the photophore to a certain extent.

==== Nervous System ====
The northern krill's nervous system controls its photophore organs and their compound eyes. The photophore organs are controlled by hormonal and neuron pathways. Hormones such as serotonin and nitric oxide manage the bioluminescence in their organs. Photophore operation is controlled by the northern krill's compound eyes by the eyes ommatidia. Ommatidia are the cells that make up their compound eyes. Part of the ommatidia's job is to send nerve signals to the photophore located on the eyestalks. These axon sending nerve signals allow the krill to control the light from the photophore.

Another essential part of the northern krill's nervous system is the brain. While small it is still majorly important in processing sensory information and coordinating behavior. To control the northern krill's swimming and food behaviors their appendages such as their swimmerets are controlled by a chain of ganglia which make up a ventral nerve cord. This nerve cord controls the motor functions of the krill and their appendages.

== Reproduction ==
Northern krill reproduce seasonally, their eggs hatching during the spring and summer months. Reproduction tends to mirror the krill's access to food. During spring and summer months their food source phytoplankton bloom and provide nutrition for their hatched larvae. Northern krill have sexual dimorphism, meaning that males and females have different reproductive structures. Females are usually smaller and have a chamber where fertilized eggs are stored and released, while males have modified pleopods specialized to transfer sperm to the female. With these appendages, males transfer packets of sperm (spermatophores). Up to 10,000 eggs can be oviparous at once. Females latch onto their eggs externally before releasing them near the surface. The eggs sink before hatching into swimming nauplius larvae.

== Genome ==
The genome of the northern krill (Meganyctiphanes norvegica) was assembled in 2024 with a total length of approximately 19.2 gigabases. This represents one of the largest genomes assembled for any animal. A significant portion of the genome is composed of repeated sequences (74%) and retrotransposons make up the majority of these repeats. Approximately 25,000 protein-coding genes have been annotated within the M. norvegica genome. Several gene families appear to have undergone expansion within the M. norvegica lineage. These include families associated with cuticle formation and moulting processes and opsins, which represent light-sensing receptor proteins in the eye. Specifically, 19 opsin genes have been identified as part of the expanded gene family set. Synonymous divergence suggests that M. norvegica and the Antarctic krill share a common ancestor approximately 130 million years ago.

The genome of the Northern krill (Meganyctiphanes norvegica) is highly repetitive, with transposable elements (TEs) accounting for a large proportion of its sequence. Retrotransposons, particularly long interspersed nuclear elements (LINEs) and long terminal repeat (LTR) retrotransposons, are more abundant than DNA transposons. The distribution of TE sequence divergence shows a unimodal pattern. DNA methylation appears to target young retrotransposons, suggesting a role in the epigenetic silencing of recent TE activity.

Resequencing of 74 individuals from eight different regions across the North Atlantic and the Mediterranean Sea uncovered around 760 million single-nucleotide polymorphisms (SNPs). Limited population structure with mean fixation index around 0.06 indicates extensive gene flow and shows Mediterranean and Atlantic stocks are not reproductively isolated. However, several hundred genes show signatures of adaptive divergence with functions in photoreception, circadian regulation, reproduction and thermal tolerance. The most diverging gene between Atlantic and Mediterranean samples was a homolog of nrf-6. This particular gene is responsible for encoding a lipid transport protein and may relate to the earlier spring spawning of Mediterranean krill.
