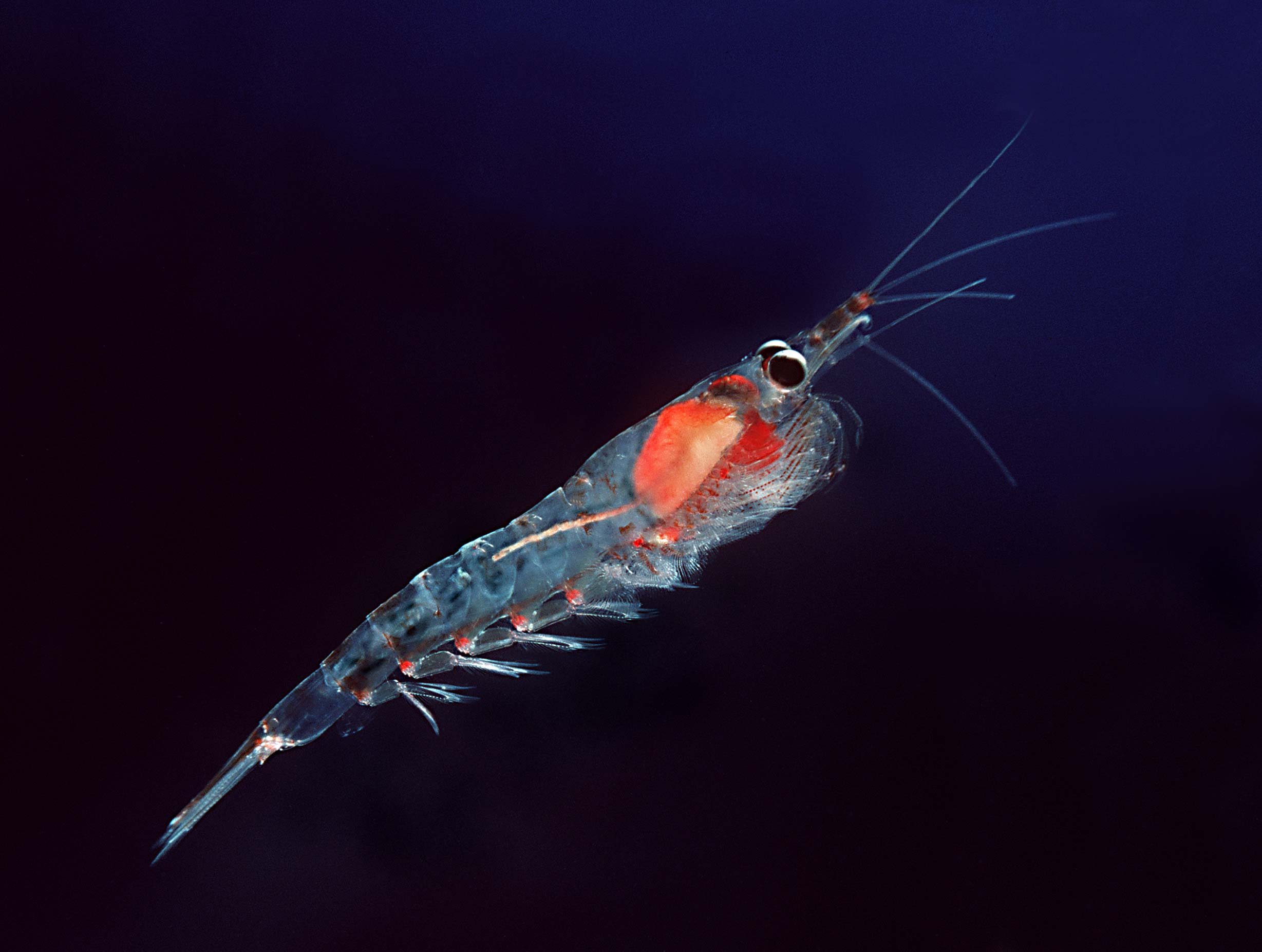
- Northern krill (Meganyctiphanes norvegica)
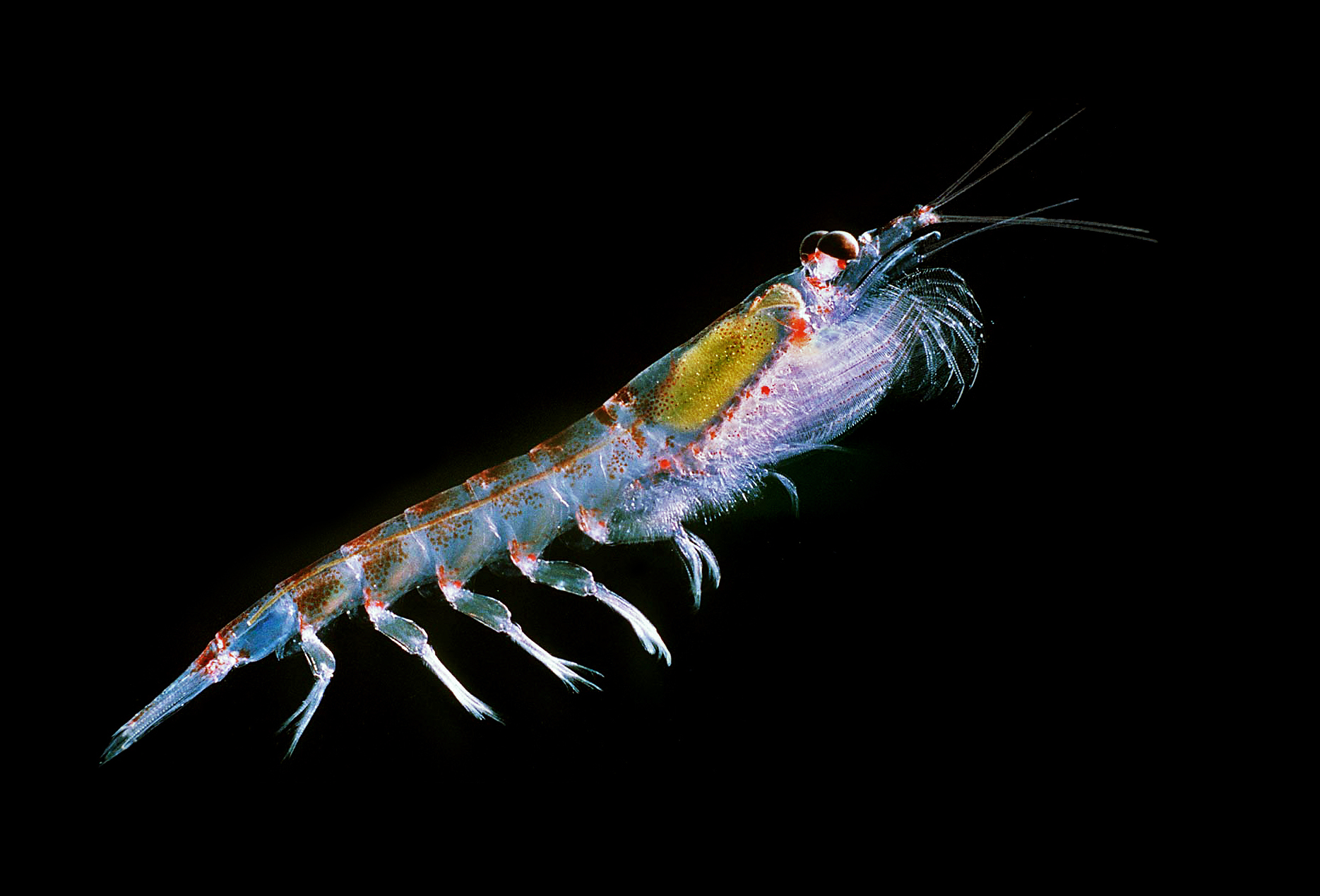
- Antarctic krill (Euphausia superba)

Scientific classification
- Kingdom: Animalia
- Phylum: Arthropoda
- Clade: Pancrustacea
- Class: Malacostraca
- Superorder: Eucarida
- Order: Euphausiacea; Dana, 1852

Families and genera
- Euphausiidae: Euphausia Dana, 1852; Hansarsia Shaw, 2023; Meganyctiphanes Holt and W. M. Tattersall, 1905; Nematobrachion Calman, 1905; Nyctiphanes G. O. Sars, 1883; Pseudeuphausia Hansen, 1910; Stylocheiron G. O. Sars, 1883; Tessarabrachion Hansen, 1911; Thysanoessa Brandt, 1851; Thysanopoda Latreille, 1831; Bentheuphausiidae: Bentheuphausia G. O. Sars, 1885

= Krill =

Small, shrimp-like crustaceans; order of crustaceans

Krill (Euphausiids) (sing.: krill) are small and exclusively marine crustaceans of the order Euphausiacea, found in all of the world's oceans. The name "krill" comes from the Norwegian word krill, meaning "small fry of fish", which is also often attributed to species of fish.

Krill are considered an important trophic level connection near the bottom of the food chain. They feed on phytoplankton and, to a lesser extent, zooplankton, and are also the main source of food for many larger animals. In the Southern Ocean, one species, the Antarctic krill, makes up an estimated biomass of around 379 million tonnes (418 million tons), making it among the species with the largest total biomass. Over half of this biomass is eaten by whales, seals, penguins, seabirds, squid, and fish each year. Most krill species display large daily vertical migrations, providing food for predators near the surface at night and in deeper waters during the day.

Krill are fished commercially in the Southern Ocean and in the waters around Japan. The total global harvest amounts to 150,000 to 200,000 tonnes (170,000 to 220,000 tons) annually, mostly from the Scotia Sea. Most krill catch is used for aquaculture and aquarium feeds, as bait in sport fishing, or in the pharmaceutical industry. Krill are also used for human consumption in several countries. They are known as okiami (オキアミ) in Japan, while in the Philippines they are called alamang and are used to make a salty paste called bagoong.

Krill are also the main food for baleen whales, including the blue whale.

== Taxonomy ==
Krill belong to the large arthropod subphylum, the Crustacea. The most familiar and largest group of crustaceans, the class Malacostraca, includes the superorder Eucarida comprising the three orders, Euphausiacea (krill), Decapoda (shrimp, prawns, lobsters, crabs), and the planktonic Amphionidacea.

The order Euphausiacea comprises two families. The more abundant Euphausiidae contains 10 different genera with a total of 85 species. Of these, the genus Euphausia is the largest, with 31 species. The lesser-known family, the Bentheuphausiidae, has only one species, Bentheuphausia amblyops, a bathypelagic krill living in deep waters below 1,000 m (3,300 ft). It is considered the most primitive extant krill species.

Well-known species of the Euphausiidae of commercial krill fisheries include Antarctic krill (Euphausia superba), Pacific krill (E. pacifica) and Northern krill (Meganyctiphanes norvegica).

=== Phylogeny ===
Proposed phylogeny of Euphausiacea

- Euphausiacea
  - Bentheuphausiidae
    Bentheuphausia
  - Euphausiidae
    - Thysanopoda (♣)
    - Nematobrachion (♦)
    - Euphausiinae
      - Meganyctiphanes
      - Euphausiini (♠)(♦)
        - Pseudeuphausia
        - Euphausia
      - Nematoscelini (♠)
        - Nyctiphanes
        - Nematoscelina (♠)
          - Nematoscelis
          - Thysanoessa
          - Tessarabrachion
          - Stylocheiron

Phylogeny obtained from morphological data, (♠) names coined in, (♣) possibly paraphyletic taxon due to Nematobrachion in. (♦) clades differs from Casanova (1984), where Pseudoeuphausia is sister to Nyctiphanes, Euphausia is sister to Thysanopoda and Nematobrachion is sister to Stylocheiron.

As of 2013, the order Euphausiacea is believed to be monophyletic due to several unique conserved morphological characteristics (autapomorphy) such as its naked filamentous gills and thin thoracopods and by molecular studies.

There have been many theories of the location of the order Euphausiacea. Since the first description of Thysanopode tricuspide by Henri Milne-Edwards in 1830, the similarity of their biramous thoracopods had led zoologists to group euphausiids and Mysidacea in the order Schizopoda, which was split by Johan Erik Vesti Boas in 1883 into two separate orders. Later, William Thomas Calman (1904) ranked the Mysidacea in the superorder Peracarida and euphausiids in the superorder Eucarida, although even up to the 1930s the order Schizopoda was advocated. It was later also proposed that order Euphausiacea should be grouped with the Penaeidae (family of prawns) in the Decapoda based on developmental similarities, as noted by Robert Gurney and Isabella Gordon. The reason for this debate is that krill share some morphological features of decapods and others of mysids.

Molecular studies have not unambiguously grouped them, possibly due to the paucity of key rare species such as Bentheuphausia amblyops in krill and Amphionides reynaudii in Eucarida. One study supports the monophyly of Eucarida (with basal Mysida), another groups Euphausiacea with Mysida (the Schizopoda), while yet another groups Euphausiacea with Hoplocarida.

=== Timeline ===
No extant fossil can be unequivocally assigned to Euphausiacea. Some extinct eumalacostracan taxa have been thought to be euphausiaceans such as Anthracophausia, Crangopsis—now assigned to the Aeschronectida (Hoplocarida)—and Palaeomysis. All dating of speciation events were estimated by molecular clock methods, which placed the last common ancestor of the krill family Euphausiidae (order Euphausiacea minus Bentheuphausia amblyops) to have lived in the Lower Cretaceous about 130 million years ago.

== Distribution ==
Krill occur worldwide in all oceans, although many individual species have endemic or neritic (i.e., coastal) distributions. Bentheuphausia amblyops, a bathypelagic species, has a cosmopolitan distribution within its deep-sea habitat.

Species of the genus Thysanoessa occur in both Atlantic and Pacific oceans. The Pacific is home to Euphausia pacifica. Northern krill occur across the Atlantic from the Mediterranean Sea northward.

Species with neritic distributions include the four species of the genus Nyctiphanes. They are highly abundant along the upwelling regions of the California, Humboldt, Benguela, and Canarias current systems. Another species having only neritic distribution is E. crystallorophias, which is endemic to the Antarctic coastline.

Species with endemic distributions include Nyctiphanes capensis, which occurs only in the Benguela Current, E. mucronata in the Humboldt Current, and the six Euphausia species native to the Southern Ocean.

In the Antarctic, seven species are known, one in genus Thysanoessa (T. macrura) and six in Euphausia. The Antarctic krill (Euphausia superba) commonly lives at depths reaching 100 m (330 ft), whereas ice krill (Euphausia crystallorophias) reach depth of 4,000 m (13,100 ft), though they commonly inhabit depths of at most 300–600 m (1,000–2,000 ft). Krill perform Diel Vertical Migrations (DVM) in large swarms, and acoustic data has shown these migrations to go up to 400 metres in depth. Both are found at latitudes south of 55° S, with E. crystallorophias dominating south of 74° S and in regions of pack ice. Other species known in the Southern Ocean are E. frigida, E. longirostris, E. triacantha and E. vallentini.

== Anatomy and morphology ==
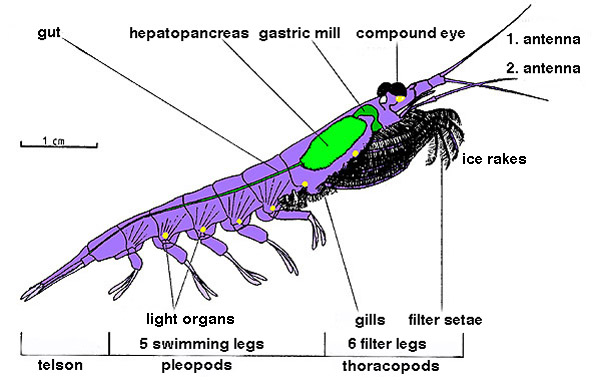
Krill anatomy explained, using Euphausia superba as a model

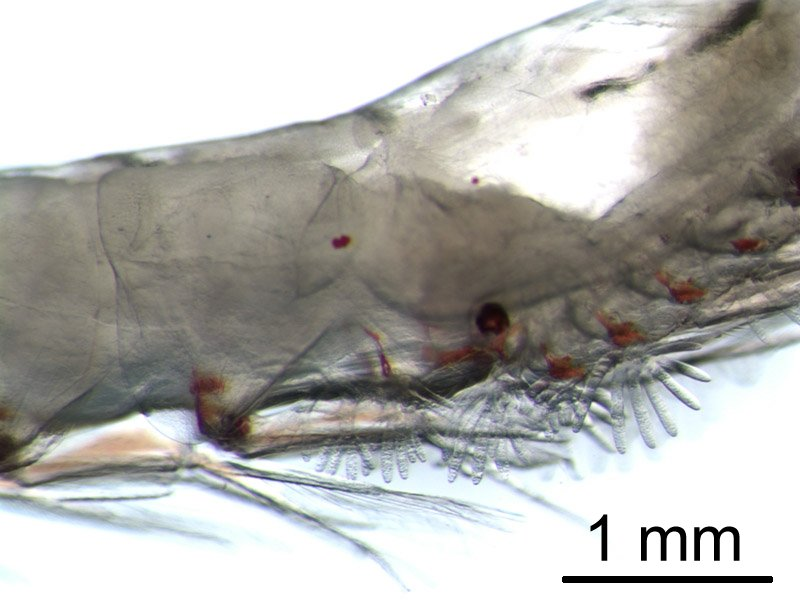
The gills of krill are externally visible

Krill are crustaceans and, like all crustaceans, they have a chitinous exoskeleton. They have anatomy similar to a standard decapod with their bodies made up of three parts: the cephalothorax is composed of the head and the thorax, which are fused, and the abdomen, which bears the ten swimming appendages, and the tail fan. This outer shell of krill is transparent in most species.

The compound eyes of krill contain opsins — a group of proteins responsible for detecting light. The number and variety of opsin genes vary amongst different species inhabiting various climatic zones and latitudes. Species with multiple copies of opsins may be better able to distinguish subtle differences in the blue-green spectrum of light, which may enhance their visual capabilities under varying oceanic lighting conditions.

They have two antennae and several pairs of thoracic legs called pereiopods or thoracopods, so named because they are attached to the thorax. Their number varies among genera and species. These thoracic legs include feeding legs and grooming legs.

Krill are probably the sister clade of decapods because all species have five pairs of swimming legs called "swimmerets" in common with the latter, very similar to those of a lobster or freshwater crayfish.

In spite of having ten swimmerets, otherwise known as pleopods, krill cannot be considered decapods. They lack any true ground-based legs due to all their pereiopods having been converted into grooming and auxiliary feeding legs. In Decapoda, there are ten functioning pereiopods, giving them their name; whereas here there are no remaining locomotive pereiopods. Nor are there consistently ten pereiopods at all.

Most krill are about 1–2 centimetres (0.4–0.8 in) long as adults. A few species grow to sizes on the order of 6–15 centimetres (2.4–5.9 in). The largest krill species, Thysanopoda cornuta, lives deep in the open ocean. Krill can be easily distinguished from other crustaceans such as true shrimp by their externally visible gills.

Except for Bentheuphausia amblyops, krill are bioluminescent animals having organs called photophores that can emit light. The light is generated by an enzyme-catalysed chemiluminescence reaction, wherein a luciferin (a kind of pigment) is activated by a luciferase enzyme. Studies indicate that the luciferin of many krill species is a fluorescent tetrapyrrole similar but not identical to dinoflagellate luciferin and that the krill probably do not produce this substance themselves but acquire it as part of their diet, which contains dinoflagellates. Krill photophores are complex organs with lenses and focusing abilities, and can be rotated by muscles. The precise function of these organs is as yet unknown; possibilities include mating, social interaction or orientation and as a form of counter-illumination camouflage to compensate their shadow against overhead ambient light.

== Ecology ==
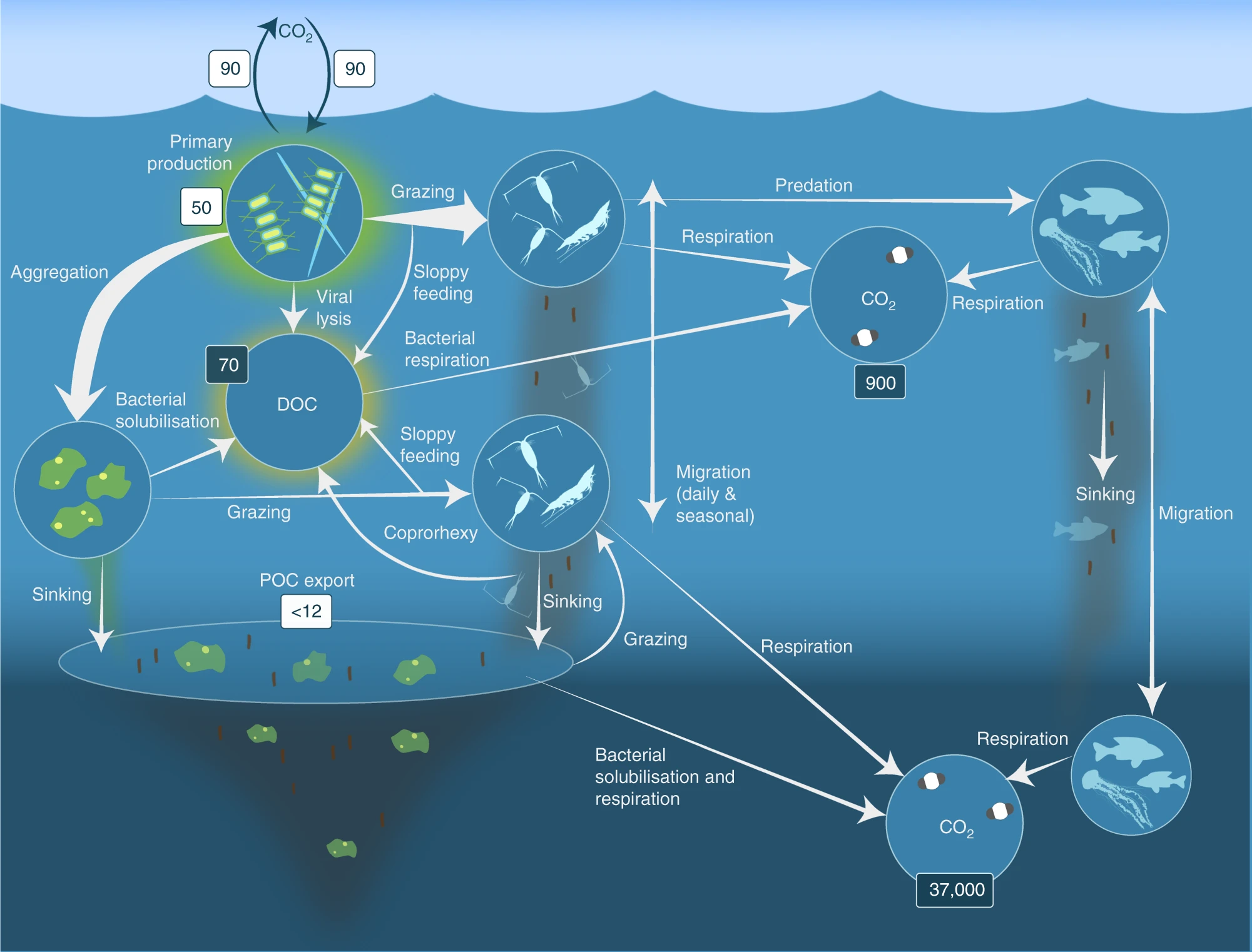
Processes in the biological pump Phytoplankton convert CO_{2}, which has dissolved from the atmosphere into the surface oceans (90 Gt yr^{−1}) into particulate organic carbon (POC) during primary production (~ 50 Gt C yr^{−1}). Phytoplankton are then consumed by krill and small zooplankton grazers, which in turn are preyed upon by higher trophic levels. Any unconsumed phytoplankton form aggregates, and along with zooplankton faecal pellets, sink rapidly and are exported out of the mixed layer (< 12 Gt C yr^{−1}). Krill, zooplankton and microbes intercept phytoplankton in the surface ocean and sinking detrital particles at depth, consuming and respiring this POC to CO_{2} (dissolved inorganic carbon, DIC), such that only a small proportion of surface-produced carbon sinks to the deep ocean (i.e., depths > 1000 m). As krill and smaller zooplankton feed, they also physically fragment particles into small, slower- or non-sinking pieces (via sloppy feeding, coprorhexy if fragmenting faeces), retarding POC export. This releases dissolved organic carbon (DOC) either directly from cells or indirectly via bacterial solubilisation (yellow circle around DOC). Bacteria can then remineralise the DOC to DIC (CO_{2}, microbial gardening). Diel vertically migrating krill, smaller zooplankton and fish can actively transport carbon to depth by consuming POC in the surface layer at night, and metabolising it at their daytime, mesopelagic residence depths. Depending on species's life history, active transport may occur on a seasonal basis as well. Numbers given are carbon fluxes (Gt C yr^{−1}) in white boxes and carbon masses (Gt C) in dark boxes.

=== Feeding ===
Many krill are filter feeders: their frontmost appendages, the thoracopods, form very fine combs with which they can filter out their food from the water. These filters can be very fine in species (such as Euphausia spp.) that feed primarily on phytoplankton, in particular on diatoms, which are unicellular algae. Krill are mostly omnivorous, although a few species are carnivorous, preying on small zooplankton and fish larvae.

Krill are an important element of the aquatic food chain. Krill convert the primary production of their prey into a form suitable for consumption by larger animals that cannot feed directly on the minuscule algae. Northern krill and some other species have a relatively small filtering basket and actively hunt copepods and larger zooplankton.

=== Predation ===
Many animals feed on krill, ranging from smaller animals like fish or penguins to larger ones like seals and baleen whales.

Disturbances of an ecosystem resulting in a decline in the krill population can have far-reaching effects. During a coccolithophore bloom in the Bering Sea in 1998, for instance, the diatom concentration dropped in the affected area. Krill cannot feed on the smaller coccolithophores, and consequently the krill population (mainly E. pacifica) in that region declined sharply. This in turn affected other species: the shearwater population dropped. The incident was thought to have been one reason salmon did not spawn that season.

Several single-celled endoparasitoidic ciliates of the genus Collinia can infect species of krill and devastate affected populations. Such diseases were reported for Thysanoessa inermis in the Bering Sea and also for E. pacifica, Thysanoessa spinifera, and T. gregaria off the North American Pacific coast. Some ectoparasites of the family Dajidae (epicaridean isopods) afflict krill (and also shrimp and mysids); one such parasite is Oculophryxus bicaulis, which was found on the krill Stylocheiron affine and S. longicorne. It attaches itself to the animal's eyestalk and sucks blood from its head; it apparently inhibits the host's reproduction, as none of the afflicted animals reached maturity.

Climate change poses another threat to krill populations.

=== Plastics ===
Preliminary research indicates krill can digest microplastics under 5 mm (0.20 in) in diameter, breaking them down and excreting them back into the environment in smaller form.

== Life history and behavior ==
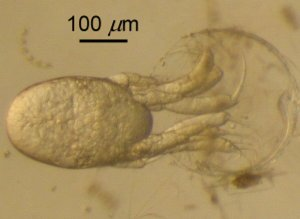
A nauplius of Euphausia pacifica hatching, emerging backwards from the egg

The life cycle of krill is relatively well understood, despite minor variations in detail from species to species. After krill hatch, they experience several larval stages—nauplius, pseudometanauplius, metanauplius, calyptopsis, and furcilia, each of which divides into sub-stages. The pseudometanauplius stage is exclusive to species that lay their eggs within an ovigerous sac: so-called "sac-spawners". The larvae grow and moult repeatedly as they develop, replacing their rigid exoskeleton when it becomes too small. Smaller animals moult more frequently than larger ones. Yolk reserves within their body nourish the larvae through metanauplius stage.

By the calyptopsis stages differentiation has progressed far enough for them to develop a mouth and a digestive tract, and they begin to eat phytoplankton. By that time their yolk reserves are exhausted and the larvae must have reached the photic zone, the upper layers of the ocean where algae flourish. During the furcilia stages, segments with pairs of swimmerets are added, beginning at the frontmost segments. Each new pair becomes functional only at the next moult. The number of segments added during any one of the furcilia stages may vary even within one species depending on environmental conditions. After the final furcilia stage, an immature juvenile emerges in a shape similar to an adult, and subsequently develops gonads and matures sexually.

=== Reproduction ===
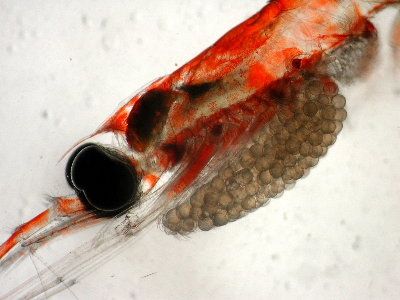
The head of a female krill of the sac-spawning species Nematoscelis difficilis with her brood sac. The eggs have a diameter of 0.3–0.4 millimetres (0.012–0.016 in)

During the mating season, which varies by species and climate, the male deposits a sperm sack at the female's genital opening (named thelycum). The females can carry several thousand eggs in their ovary, which may then account for as much as one third of the animal's body mass. Krill can have multiple broods in one season, with interbrood intervals lasting on the order of days.

Krill employ two types of spawning mechanism. The 57 species of the genera Bentheuphausia, Euphausia, Meganyctiphanes, Thysanoessa, and Thysanopoda are "broadcast spawners": the female releases the fertilised eggs into the water, where they usually sink, disperse, and are on their own. These species generally hatch in the nauplius 1 stage, but have recently been discovered to hatch sometimes as metanauplius or even as calyptopis stages. The remaining 29 species of the other genera are "sac spawners", where the female carries the eggs with her, attached to the rearmost pairs of thoracopods until they hatch as metanauplii, although some species like Nematoscelis difficilis may hatch as nauplius or pseudometanauplius.

=== Moulting ===
Moulting occurs whenever a specimen outgrows its rigid exoskeleton. Young animals, growing faster, moult more often than older and larger ones. The frequency of moulting varies widely by species and is, even within one species, subject to many external factors such as latitude, water temperature, and food availability. The subtropical species Nyctiphanes simplex, for instance, has an overall inter-moult period of two to seven days: larvae moult on the average every four days, while juveniles and adults do so, on average, every six days. For E. superba in the Antarctic sea, inter-moult periods ranging between 9 and 28 days depending on the temperature between −1 and 4 °C (30 and 39 °F) have been observed, and for Meganyctiphanes norvegica in the North Sea the inter-moult periods range also from 9 and 28 days but at temperatures between 2.5 and 15 °C (36.5 and 59.0 °F). E. superba is able to reduce its body size when there is not enough food available, moulting also when its exoskeleton becomes too large. Similar shrinkage has also been observed for E. pacifica, a species occurring in the Pacific Ocean from polar to temperate zones, as an adaptation to abnormally high water temperatures. Shrinkage has been postulated for other temperate-zone species of krill as well.

=== Lifespan ===
Some high-latitude species of krill can live for more than six years (e.g., Euphausia superba); others, such as the mid-latitude species Euphausia pacifica, live for only two years. Subtropical or tropical species' longevity is still shorter, e.g., Nyctiphanes simplex, which usually lives for only six to eight months.

=== Swarming ===
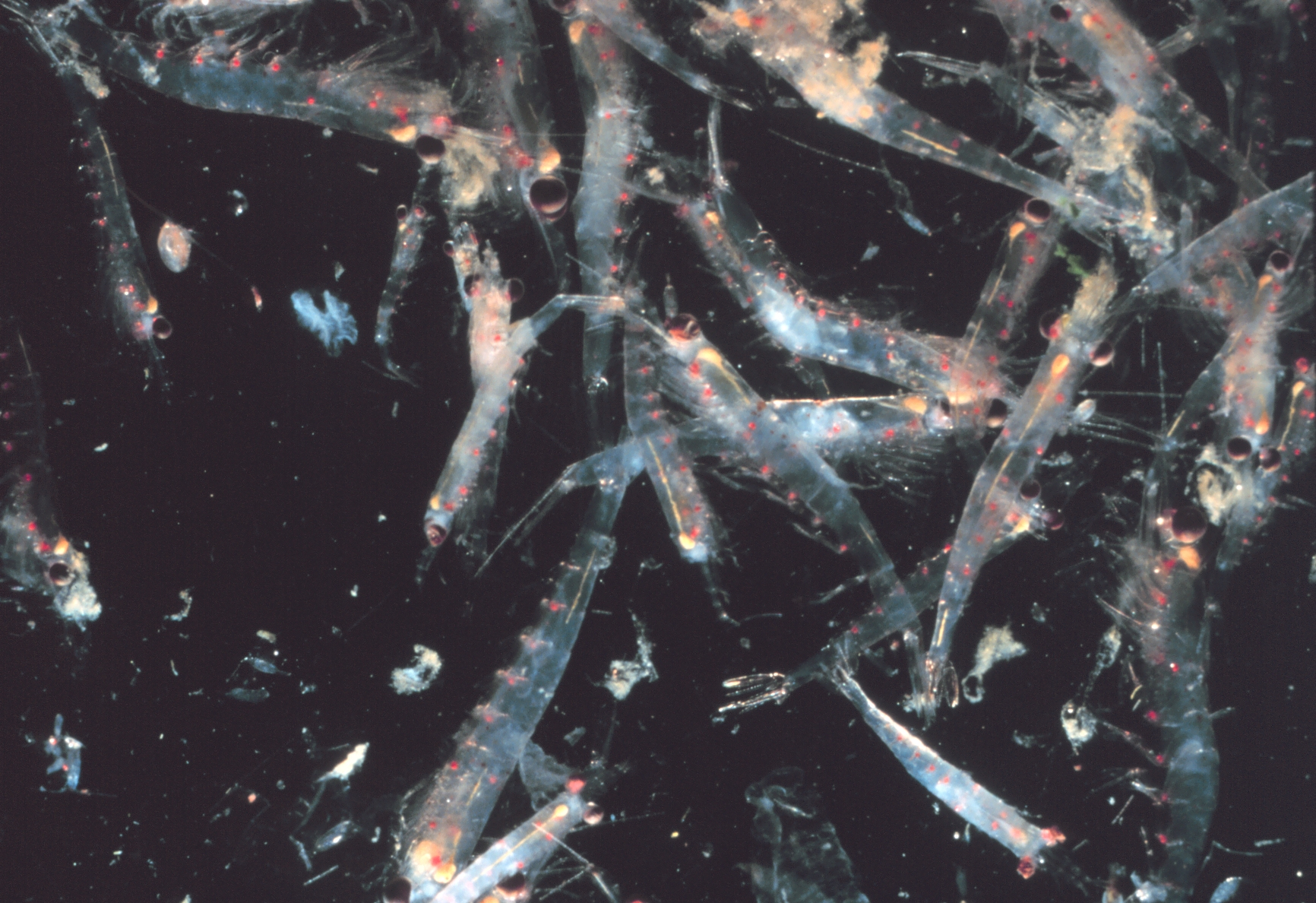
A krill swarm

Most krill are swarming animals; the sizes and densities of such swarms vary by species and region. For Euphausia superba, swarms reach 10,000 to 60,000 individuals per cubic metre. Swarming is a defensive mechanism, confusing smaller predators that would like to pick out individuals. In 2012, Gandomi and Alavi presented what appears to be a successful stochastic algorithm for modelling the behaviour of krill swarms. The algorithm is based on three main factors: " (i) movement induced by the presence of other individuals (ii) foraging activity, and (iii) random diffusion."

=== Vertical migration ===
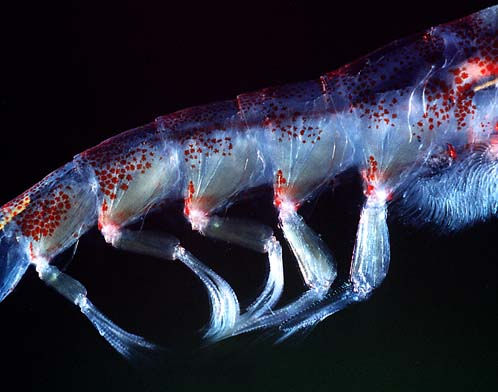
Beating pleopods of a swimming Antarctic krill

Krill typically follow a diurnal vertical migration. It has been assumed that they spend the day at greater depths and rise during the night toward the surface. The deeper they go, the more they reduce their activity, apparently to reduce encounters with predators and to conserve energy. Swimming activity in krill varies with stomach fullness. Sated animals that had been feeding at the surface swim less actively and therefore sink below the mixed layer. As they sink they produce feces which employs a role in the Antarctic carbon cycle. Krill with empty stomachs swim more actively and thus head towards the surface.

Vertical migration may be a 2–3 times daily occurrence. Some species (e.g., Euphausia superba, E. pacifica, E. hanseni, Pseudeuphausia latifrons, and Thysanoessa spinifera) form surface swarms during the day for feeding and reproductive purposes even though such behaviour is dangerous because it makes them extremely vulnerable to predators.

Experimental studies using Artemia salina as a model suggest that the vertical migrations of krill several hundreds of metres, in groups tens of metres deep, could collectively create enough downward jets of water to have a significant effect on ocean mixing.

Dense swarms can elicit a feeding frenzy among fish, birds and mammal predators, especially near the surface. When disturbed, a swarm scatters, and some individuals have even been observed to moult instantly, leaving the exuvia behind as a decoy.

Krill normally swim at a pace of 5–10 cm/s (2–3 body lengths per second), using their swimmerets for propulsion. Their larger migrations are subject to ocean currents. When in danger, they show an escape reaction called lobstering—flicking their caudal structures, the telson and the uropods, they move backwards through the water relatively quickly, achieving speeds in the range of 10 to 27 body lengths per second, which for large krill such as E. superba means around 0.8 m/s (3 ft/s). Their swimming performance has led many researchers to classify adult krill as micro-nektonic life-forms, i.e., small animals capable of individual motion against (weak) currents. Larval forms of krill are generally considered zooplankton.

== Biogeochemical cycles ==
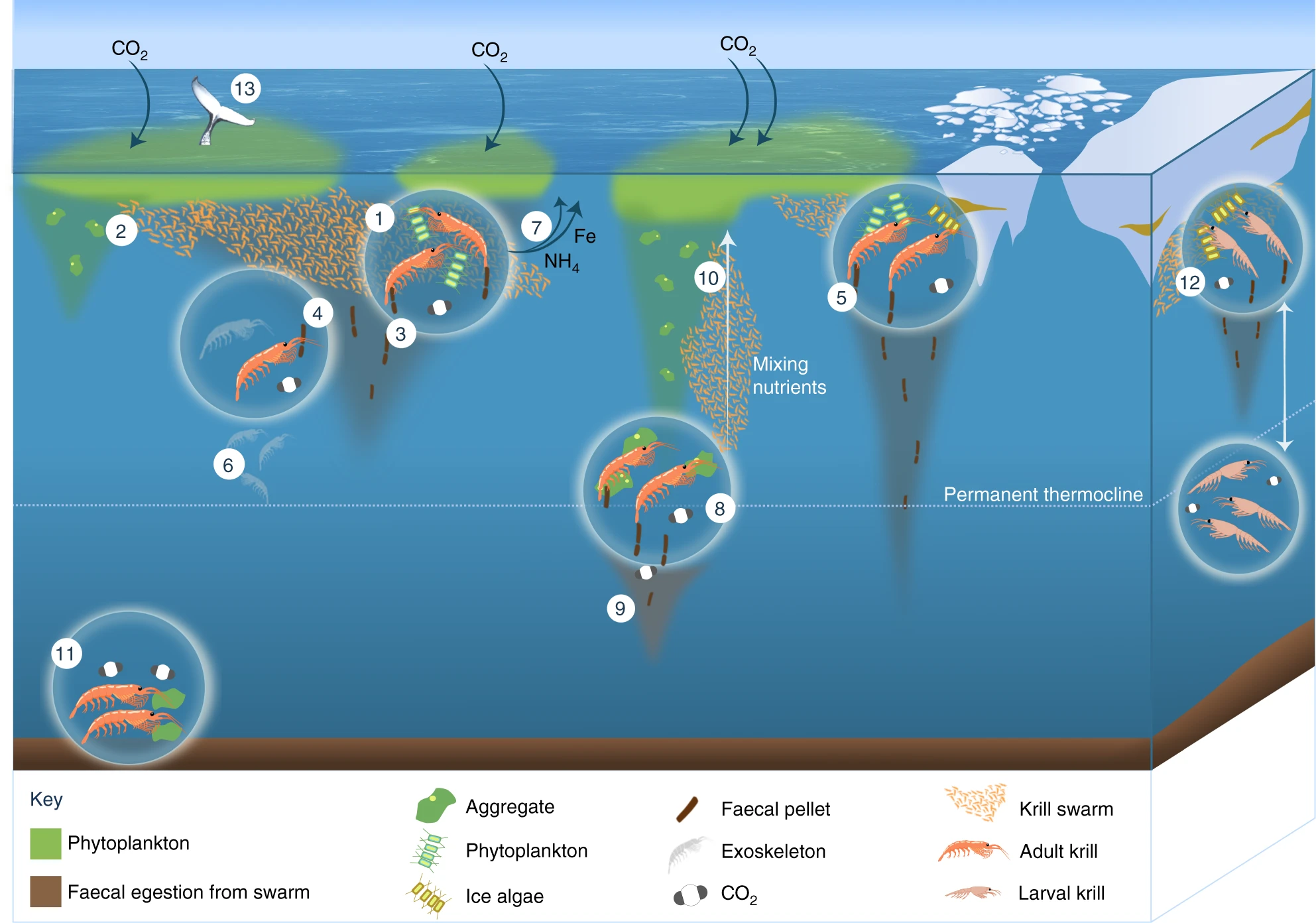
Role of Antarctic krill in biogeochemical cycles Krill (as swarms and individuals) feed on phytoplankton at the surface leaving only a proportion to sink as phytodetrital aggregates, which are broken up easily and may not sink below the permanent thermocline. Krill also release faecal pellets whilst they feed, which can sink to the deep sea but can be consumed (coprophagy) and degraded as they descend by krill, bacteria and zooplankton. In the marginal ice zone, faecal pellet flux can reach greater depths. Krill also release moults, which sink and contribute to the carbon flux. Nutrients are released by krill during sloppy feeding, excretion and egestion, such as iron and ammonium (see Fig. 2 for other nutrients released), and if they are released near the surface can stimulate phytoplankton production and further atmospheric CO_{2} drawdown. Some adult krill permanently reside deeper in the water column, consuming organic material at depth. Any carbon (as organic matter or as CO_{2}) that sinks below the permanent thermocline is removed from subjection to seasonal mixing and will remain stored in the deep ocean for at least a year. The swimming motions of migrating adult krill that migrate can mix nutrient-rich water from the deep, further stimulating primary production. Other adult krill forage on the seafloor, releasing respired CO_{2} at depth and may be consumed by demersal predators. Larval krill, which in the Southern Ocean reside under the sea ice, undergo extensive diurnal vertical migration, potentially transferring CO_{2} below the permanent thermocline. Krill are consumed by many predators including baleen whales, leading to storage of some of the krill carbon as biomass for decades before the whale dies, sinks to the seafloor and is consumed by deep sea organisms.

The Antarctic krill is an important species in the context of biogeochemical cycling and in the Antarctic food web. It plays a prominent role in the Southern Ocean because of its ability to cycle nutrients and to feed penguins and baleen and blue whales.

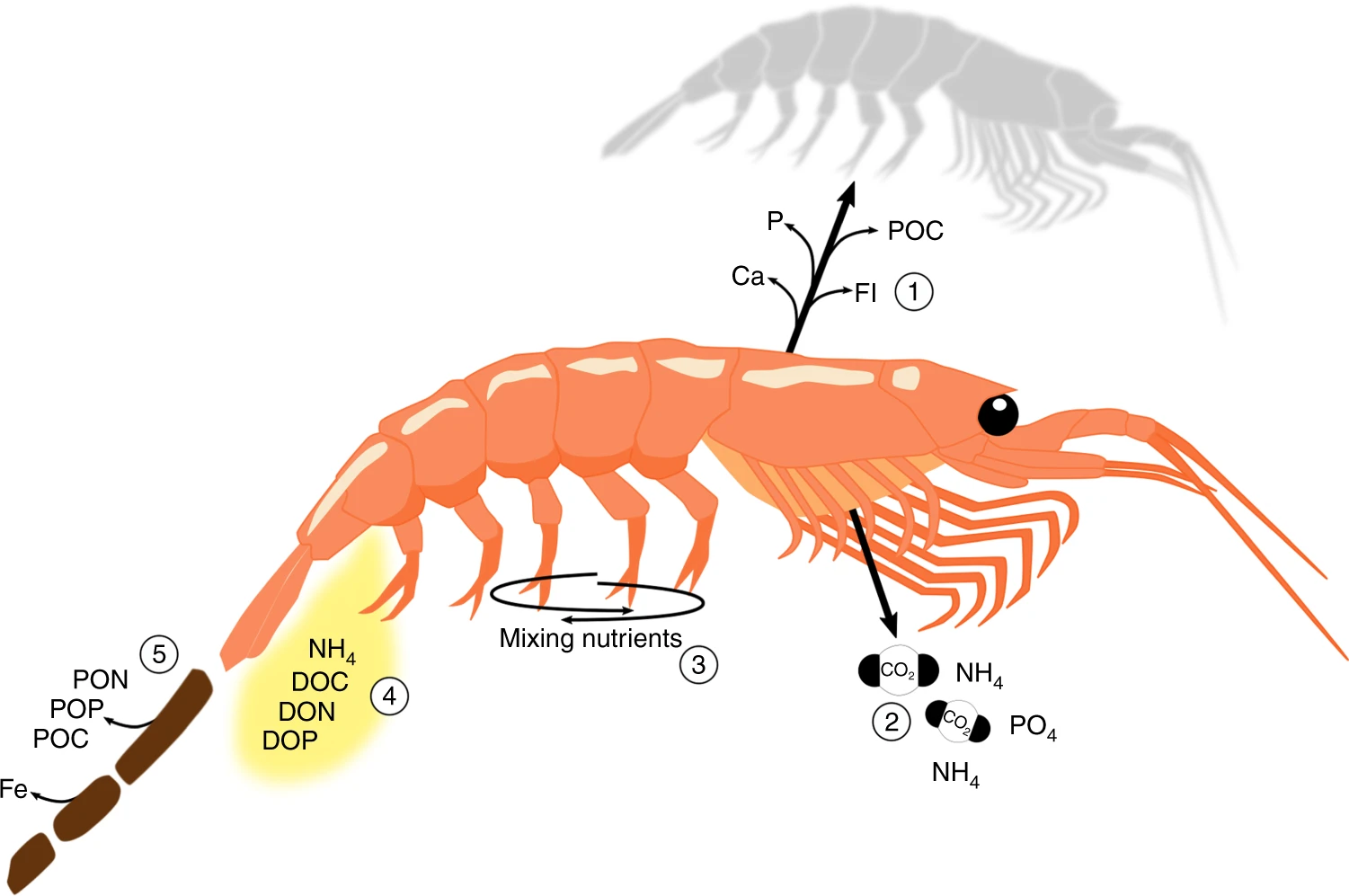
Cycling of nutrients by an individual krill When krill moult they release dissolved calcium, fluoride and phosphorus from the exoskeleton. The chitin (organic material) that forms the exoskeleton contributes to organic particle flux sinking to the deep ocean. Krill respire a portion of the energy derived from consuming phytoplankton or other animals as carbon dioxide, when swimming from mid/deep waters to the surface in large swarms krill mix water, which potentially brings nutrients to nutrient-poor surface waters, ammonium and phosphate is released from the gills and when excreting, along with dissolved organic carbon, nitrogen (e.g., urea) and phosphorus (DOC, DON and DOP). Krill release fast-sinking faecal pellets containing particulate organic carbon, nitrogen and phosphorus (POC, PON and POP) and iron, the latter of which is bioavailable when leached into surrounding waters along with DOC, DON and DOP.

== Human uses ==
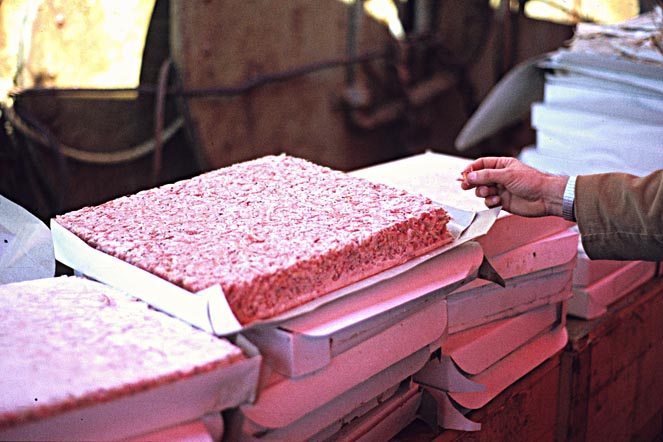
Deep-frozen plates of Antarctic krill for use as animal feed and raw material for cooking

=== Harvesting history ===
Krill have been harvested as a food source for humans and domesticated animals since at least the 19th century, and possibly earlier in Japan, where it was known as okiami. Large-scale fishing developed in the late 1960s and early 1970s, and now occurs only in Antarctic waters and in the seas around Japan. Historically, the largest krill fishery nations were Japan and the Soviet Union, or, after the latter's dissolution, Russia and Ukraine. The harvest peaked, which in 1983 was about 528,000 tonnes (582,000 tons) in the Southern Ocean alone (of which the Soviet Union took in 93%), is now managed as a precaution against overfishing.

In 1993, two events caused a decline in krill fishing: Russia exited the industry; and the Convention for the Conservation of Antarctic Marine Living Resources (CCAMLR) defined maximum catch quotas for a sustainable exploitation of Antarctic krill. After an October 2011 review, the Commission decided not to change the quota.

The annual Antarctic catch stabilised at around 100,000 tonnes (110,000 tons), which is roughly one fiftieth of the CCAMLR catch quota. The main limiting factor was probably high costs along with political and legal issues. The Japanese fishery saturated at some 70,000 tonnes (77,000 tons)

Although krill are found worldwide, fishing in Southern Oceans are preferred because the krill are more "catchable" and abundant in these regions. Particularly in Antarctic seas which are considered as pristine, they are considered a "clean product".

In 2018 it was announced that almost every krill fishing company operating in Antarctica will abandon operations in huge areas around the Antarctic Peninsula from 2020, including "buffer zones" around breeding colonies of penguins.

=== Human consumption ===
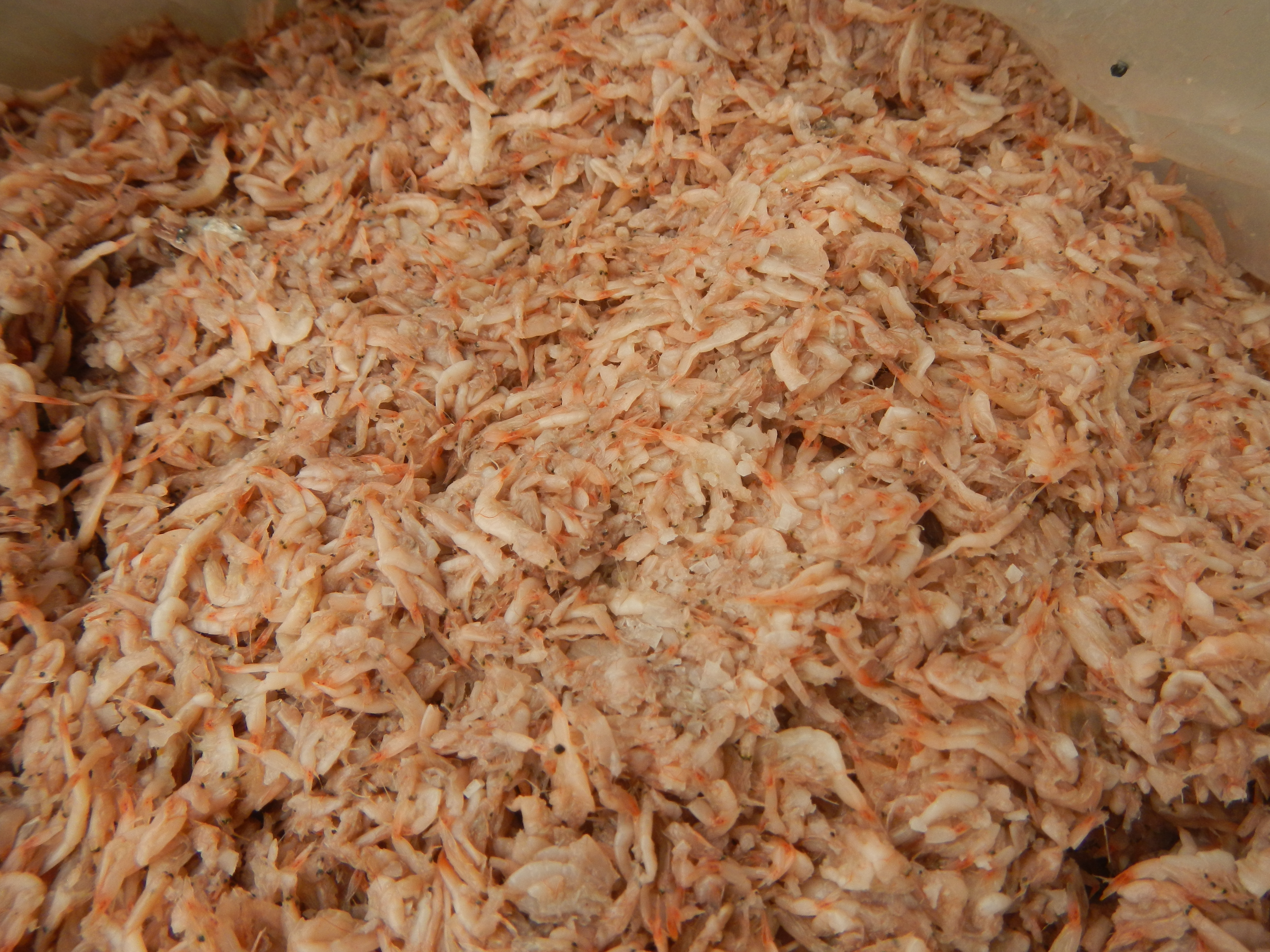
Dried fermented krill, used to make Bagoong alamang, a type of shrimp paste from the Philippines

Although the total biomass of Antarctic krill may be as abundant as 400 million tonnes (400,000,000 tonnes (440,000,000 tons)), the human impact on this keystone species is growing, with a 39% increase in total fishing yield to 294,000 tonnes (324,000 tons) over 2010–2014. Major countries involved in krill harvesting are Norway (56% of total catch in 2014), the Republic of Korea (19%), and China (18%).

Krill is a rich source of protein and omega-3 fatty acids which are under development in the early 21st century as human food, dietary supplements as oil capsules, livestock food, and pet food. Krill tastes salty with a somewhat stronger fish flavor than shrimp. For mass consumption and commercially prepared products, they must be peeled to remove the inedible exoskeleton.

Antarctic krill show seasonal metabolic flexibility, storing high levels of lipids during the summer and then relying on these reserves during winter when phytoplankton is limited, and recent aquaculture research has also identified krill meal as a promising sustainable marine lipid source.

In 2011, the US Food and Drug Administration published a letter of no objection for a manufactured krill oil product to be generally recognized as safe (GRAS) for human consumption.

Krill (and other planktonic shrimp, notably Acetes spp.) are most widely consumed in Southeast Asia, where it is fermented (with the shells intact) and usually ground finely to make shrimp paste. It can be stir-fried and eaten paired with white rice or used to add umami flavors to a wide variety of traditional dishes. The liquid from the fermentation process is also harvested as fish sauce.

== Bio-inspired robotics ==
Krill are agile swimmers in the intermediate Reynolds number regime, in which there are not many solutions for uncrewed underwater robotics, and have inspired robotic platforms to both study their locomotion as well as find design solutions for underwater robots.

== See also ==
- Antarctic krill
- Cold-water shrimp
- Crustacean
- Krill fishery
- Krill oil
- Northern krill
- Krill paradox
