= Metanauplius =

Laval stage of some crustaceans

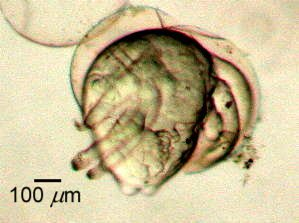
A pseudometanauplius of the krill species Nematoscelis difficilis hatches using the push-off hatching technique

Metanauplius is an early larval stage of some crustaceans such as krill. It follows the nauplius stage.

In sac-spawning krill, (Note: There are two kinds of spawning mechanisms in krill. Females of broadcast spawning species just release the fertilized eggs into the water, where they sink, disperse, and are on their own. In sac-spawning species, the female carries the eggs with her attached to her rearmost pairs of thoracopods until they hatch.) there is an intermediary phase called pseudometanauplius, a newly hatched form distinguished from older metanauplii by its extremely short abdomen. In some species, this form is not considered a separate developmental stage as it develops into a metanauplius without molting; in other species such as Nyctiphanes couchii, it can be separated from the metanauplius stage by the molt of a very thin cuticle soon after hatching.

Broadcast-spawning species of krill do not have a pseudometanauplius stage. They generally hatch in the nauplius 1 stage, but recently have been discovered to hatch sometimes as metanauplius or even as calyptopis stages.

== See also ==
- Crustacean larvae
