= Krill paradox =

Decline of krill biomass

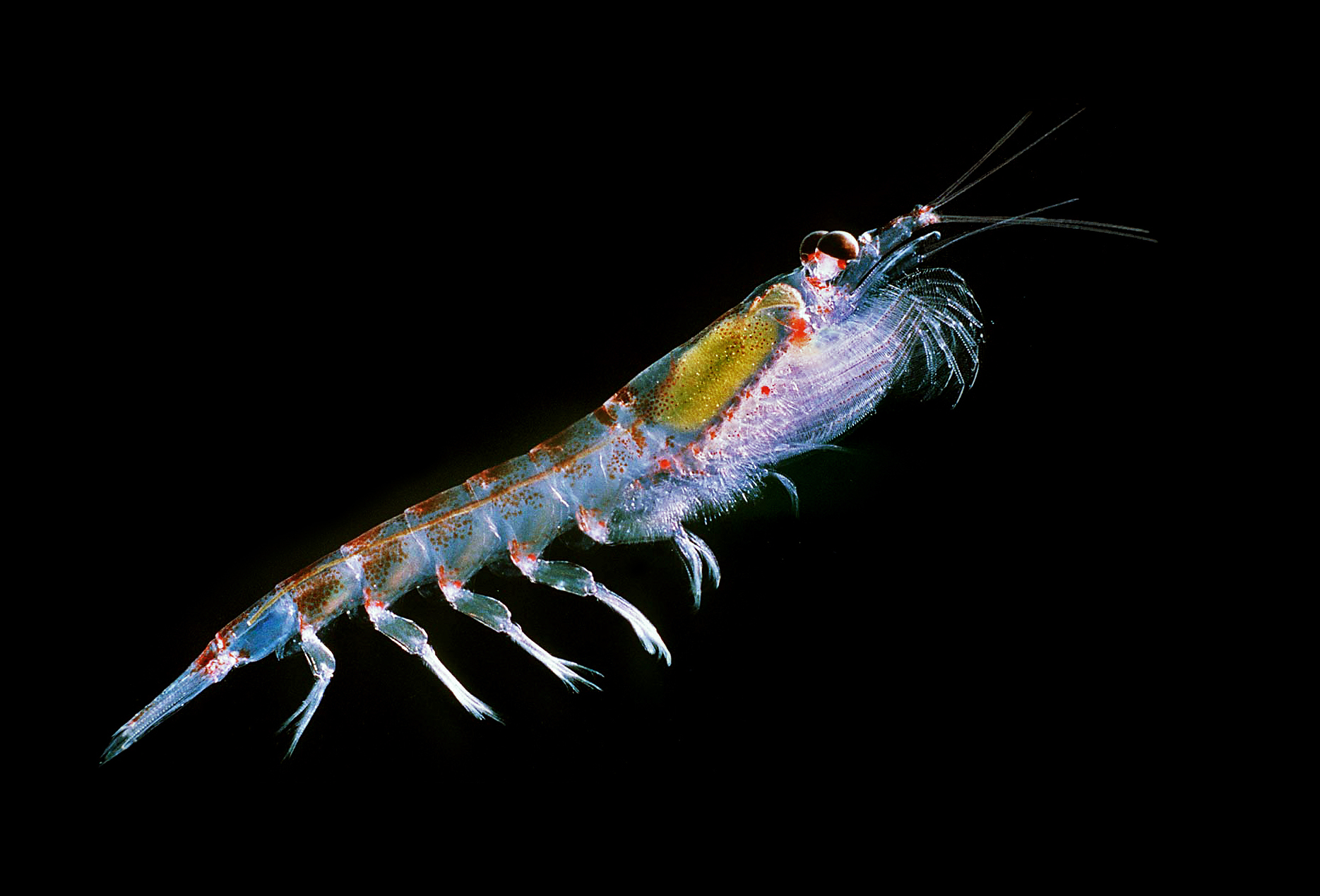
Antarctic krill (Euphausia superba)

The Krill Paradox refers to the decline of krill biomass as a result of the dramatic decline of whale populations in the Antarctic. It was at the turn of the 20th century, when technological advancements enabled the exploration of the Antarctic and its seas, that the krill paradox was first observed. Specifically, a significant drop in krill numbers was noted in the early 1970s when researchers started to report changes in krill density and distribution. One of the key studies published in Geophysical Research Letters in 2016 highlighted that this decline came from the early 1970s when scientists started noticing that krill populations had dropped by 80 to 90 percent since that time. Particularly in certain areas of the Southern Ocean, specifically around the Antarctic Peninsula.

This observation was made in conjunction with the at the time declining whale populations. During the era of great explorers like Roald Amundsen, the population of both Blue Whales and Fin whales were in the millions. However, in only about 70 years, the Whaling industry had increased so dramatically that it reduced these populations by around 90 percent. In the wake of this, the krill population decreased by around 80 percent.

A possible outcome in Lotka-Volterra competition model

This discovery was initially shocking because it defied what we knew at the time about predator and prey relationships. Most early ecological assumptions defined these predator-prey relationships on the idea that as the number of predators decreases, the number of prey should increase as a result. Early models like the Lotka-Volterra model reasserted this claim, as this was the most widely used and understood way of comprehending these animal relationships. Because the relationship between antarctic whales and plankton was so much more complex, it took much longer for scientists to get to the root of what the paradox was.

At the height of the whaling industry, the population of krill was at an all time low. The study of the paradox continued for more than 30 years before a theory by notable professors Victor Smetacek and Stephen Nicole showed that whales may act as farmers for the krill population, cultivating phytoplankton with their dung.

Further studies went on to prove that whale excretions contain high amounts of nitrogen, phosphorus, manganese, and iron. Notably, the iron in whale dung proved to be approximately 10 million times higher than the ocean water around it, making it an excellent natural fertilizer for plankton. This is due to phytoplanktons much higher iron requirements built into their photosynthetic apparatus.

The importance of whale dung as fertilizer is extremely significant, as the Southern Ocean is an environment with a very low iron limit. Meaning that the overall phytoplankton population near the Antarctic in turn is just as limited without the iron excretions made by the whales. Also known as whale pump, these mineral rich excretions are one of the most critical ways in which oceans are able to maintain healthy levels of iron and nitrogen. This critical act of iron recycling is key to maintaining both species, as the krill population depends on these nutrients just as much as the whales depend on them, creating a delicate relationship upholding much of the antarctic ecosystem.

== Changing climates and its effects on krill/other species ==
The krill's habitat in the Southern Ocean are heavily impacted not only by human fishing, but by the rapid advance of climate change. With warming temperatures and the reduction of sea ice, these changes heavily affect krill population size, physiology and behavior which has a massive impact in turn on their surrounding environment.

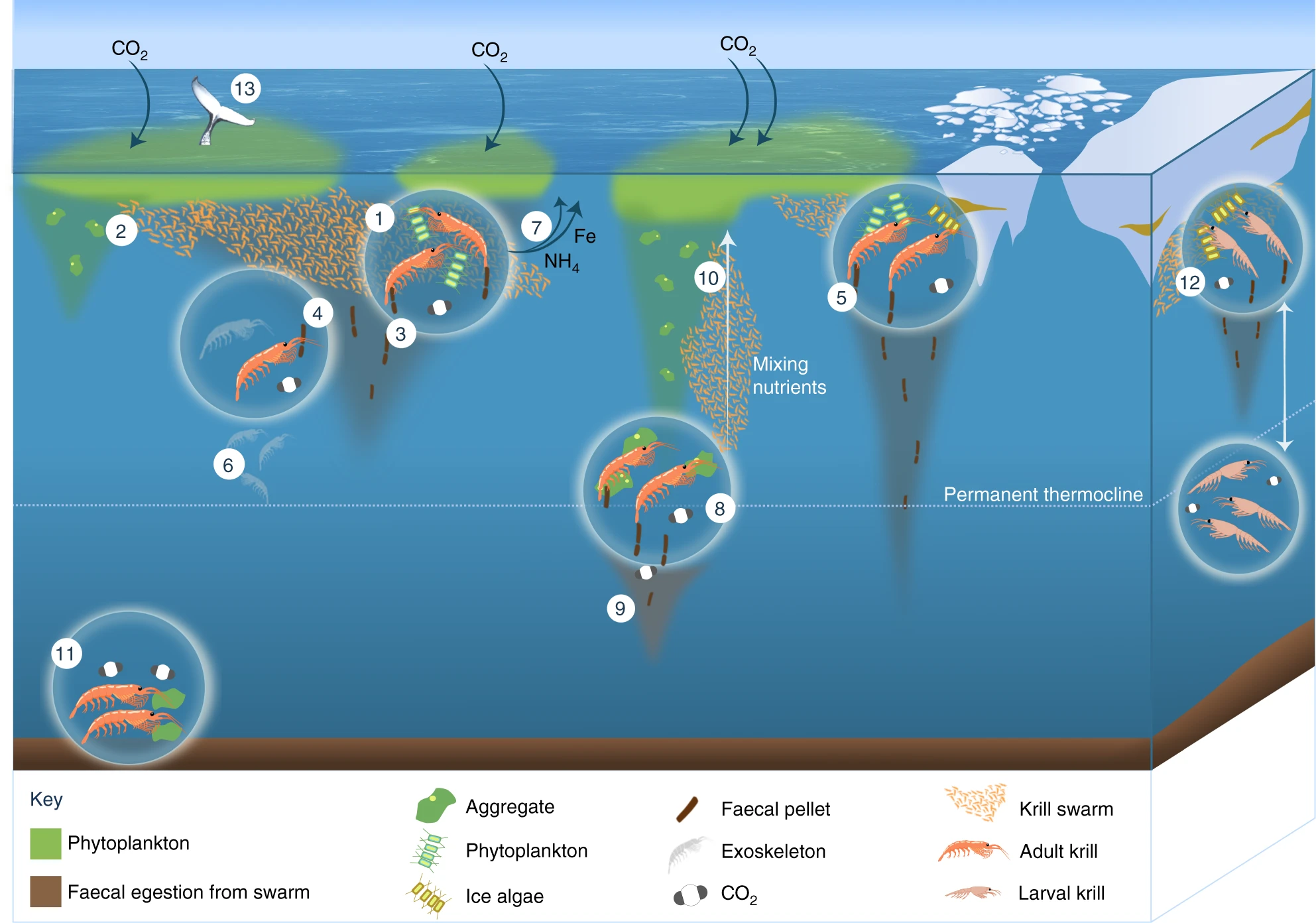
Role of Antarctic krill in biogeochemical cycles

If our current population of krill in the Southern Ocean were to completely collapse, it could destroy the Antarctic ecosystem. Krill and phytoplankton are an crucial keystone species, as they not only form the basis for their environment's food web but also play a critical role in carbon sequestration. A vast majority of marine life including seabirds, penguins, seals and fish rely on the krill population for support. A bottom-up cascade of that level could have dire consequences including malnutrition in many marine species, a lower reproduction rate of marine life as well as a potential shift in sea bird migration. Not only this but they are important mediators of biogeochemical cycling in the Southern Ocean, specifically on their ability to enhance the process of carbon sequestration.

Changes in their current habitat can affect the krill's physiology, which can also affect their behavior, such as changes in swarm size and distribution. These changes could potentially have very serious consequences, a reduction in swarm size and biomass could decrease the amount of biological carbon pump in the Antarctic, reducing the amount of fecal pellets and carcasses sinking to the ocean floor, the flow of carbon sequestration could be significantly diminished.

The current rate of krill harvesting is still a prevalent issue today, threatening to undo most of the work that has already been done, harming many critically endangered species of whales. As krill are the basis for a majority of the Southern Ocean's food web, the current demand for krill-based products in relation to our own form of farming fish has put new stress on the already teetering population of blue and fin whales.

Antarctic krill, capture production, thousand tonnes, 1970-2022

Norwegian and Chinese fisheries like Bio Marine and The CNFC bring in approximately 450,000 tons of krill each year from the Southern Ocean. Norwegian ships take up about 60 percent of the total of caught krill for the purpose of aquaculture feed and to extract krill oil for Omega 3 supplements. The current catch limit instated by the CCAMLR is around 620,000 tons, making up 10 percent of the sustainable yield. However, this current catch limit is extremely outdated, and requires revision in order to meet the needs of our current changing ecosystem. At the current rate krill is being fished, many species of marine life will not have enough food to maintain population size.

== Controversy ==
In recent years there has been some debate on the source of krill decline in conjunction with the krill paradox. In an article written by Martin James Cox in 2018, he debated how involved krill fisheries and global warming is with current krill populations. In the article he attested that there has been no long term decline of krill populations from the 1980s to the 2000s. He instead concluded that the long-term decline in the krill population is due to the failure to consider how krill density interacts with uneven sampling over time and space, as well as the use of different types of fishing nets. In response to this article, Simeon L Hill wrote a cumulative article on current krill statistics revealing Cox's original piece to be biased.

== Current programs ==
Current IPCC projections show that it is likely that with our current shift in rising temperatures that the krill population will continue to have reductions. With melting polar ice caps, the current environment has become less conducive for the krill species to thrive. CCAMLR however, plans to implement new strategies to change this by establishing MPAs (Marine Protected Areas) in the Southern Ocean in order to preserve much of the current krill population in order to stabilize their species.

Current efforts are being made by NOAA Fisheries and its partners in order to create and manage further recovery plans for the blue whale. Other organizations include the Pacific Whale Foundation and the NMMF. In terms of current ongoing efforts in krill conservation, efforts are being made by the CCAMLR and a multitude of protected sanctuaries like The South Orkney Islands southern shelf MPA and the Ross Sea region MPA.
