= Bellinge, Denmark =

Bellinge
- Town
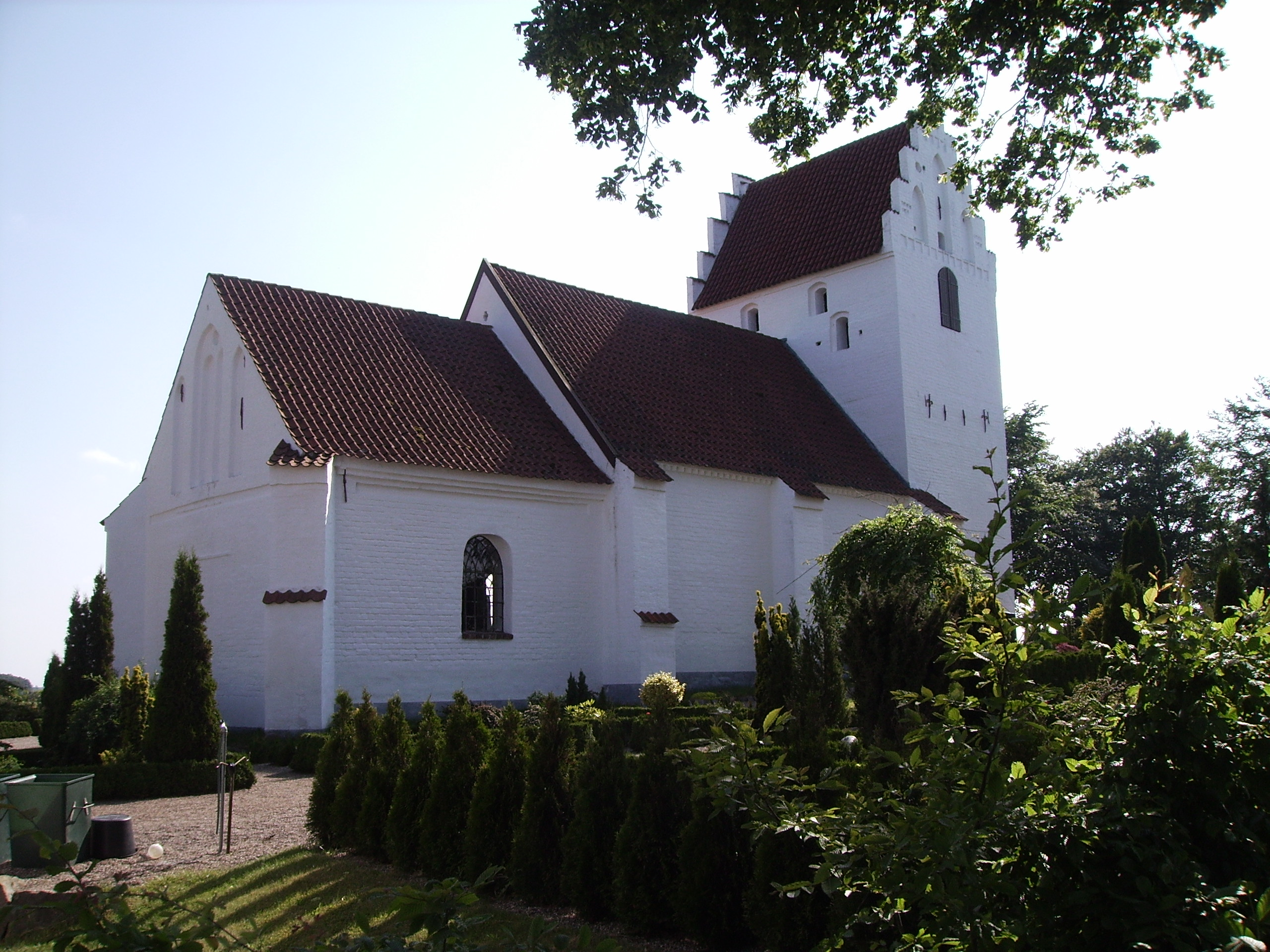
- Bellinge Church

- Location in Denmark Bellinge (Region of Southern Denmark)
- Coordinates: 55°20′6″N 10°18′48″E
- Country: Denmark
- Region: Southern Denmark
- Municipality: Odense Municipality

Area
  - Urban: 3.1 km^{2} (1.2 sq mi)

Population (2026)
  - Urban: 5,881
  - Urban density: 1,900/km^{2} (4,900/sq mi)
  - Gender: 2,869 males and 3,012 females
- Time zone: UTC+1 (CET)
  - Summer (DST): UTC+2 (CEST)
- Postal code: DK-5250 Odense SV

Bellinge is a village and parish in Denmark. It is situated southwest of Odense, and is a suburb of the city. As of 1 January 2026 the village has a population of 5,881.

It is known for its church, Bellinge Kirke, with murals dating from 1496.

== Notable people ==
- Hans Jacob Hansen (1855 in Bellinge – 1936 in Gentofte) a Danish zoologist
