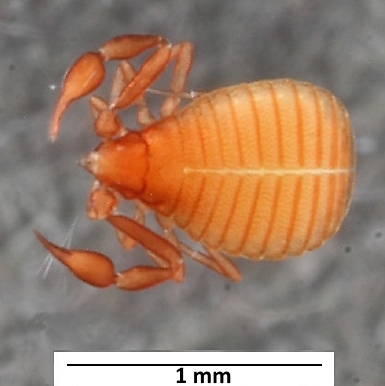
- Cheiridium museorum

Scientific classification
- Domain: Eukaryota
- Kingdom: Animalia
- Phylum: Arthropoda
- Subphylum: Chelicerata
- Class: Arachnida
- Order: Pseudoscorpiones
- Superfamily: Cheiridioidea
- Family: Cheiridiidae; Hansen, 1894

= Cheiridiidae =

Family of arachnids

Cheiridiidae is a family of pseudoscorpions belonging to the order Pseudoscorpiones. It was described in 1894 by Danish zoologist Hans Jacob Hansen.

Genera:

- Apocheiridium Chamberlin, 1924
- Cheiridium Menge, 1855
- Cryptocheiridium Chamberlin, 1931
- Electrobisium Cockerell, 1917
- Leptocheiridium Mahnert & Schmidl, 2011
- Neocheiridium Beier, 1932
- Nesocheiridium Beier, 1957
- Pycnocheiridium Beier, 1964
