= Hans Jacob Hansen =

Danish zoologist

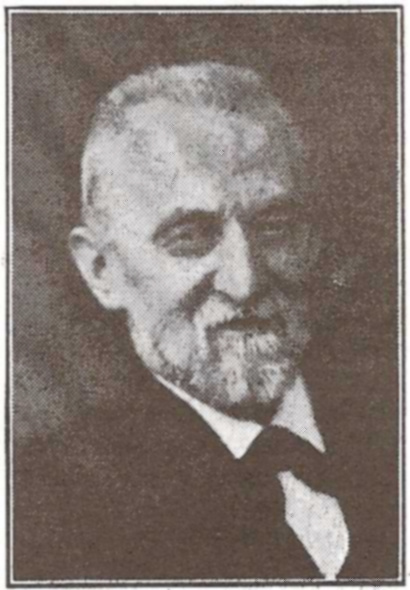
- Born: 10 August 1855; Bellinge, Denmark
- Died: 26 June 1936 (aged 80); Gentofte, Denmark
- Education: University of Copenhagen
- Occupation: Zoologist

Hans Jacob Hansen (10 August 1855 – 26 June 1936) was a Danish zoologist, known for his contributions to carcinology (the study of crustacea). He was born in Bellinge and died in Gentofte.

Hansen graduated from the University of Copenhagen in 1883 with a doctorate.

He participated on the first year of the Ingolf expedition to Iceland and Greenland in 1895.
