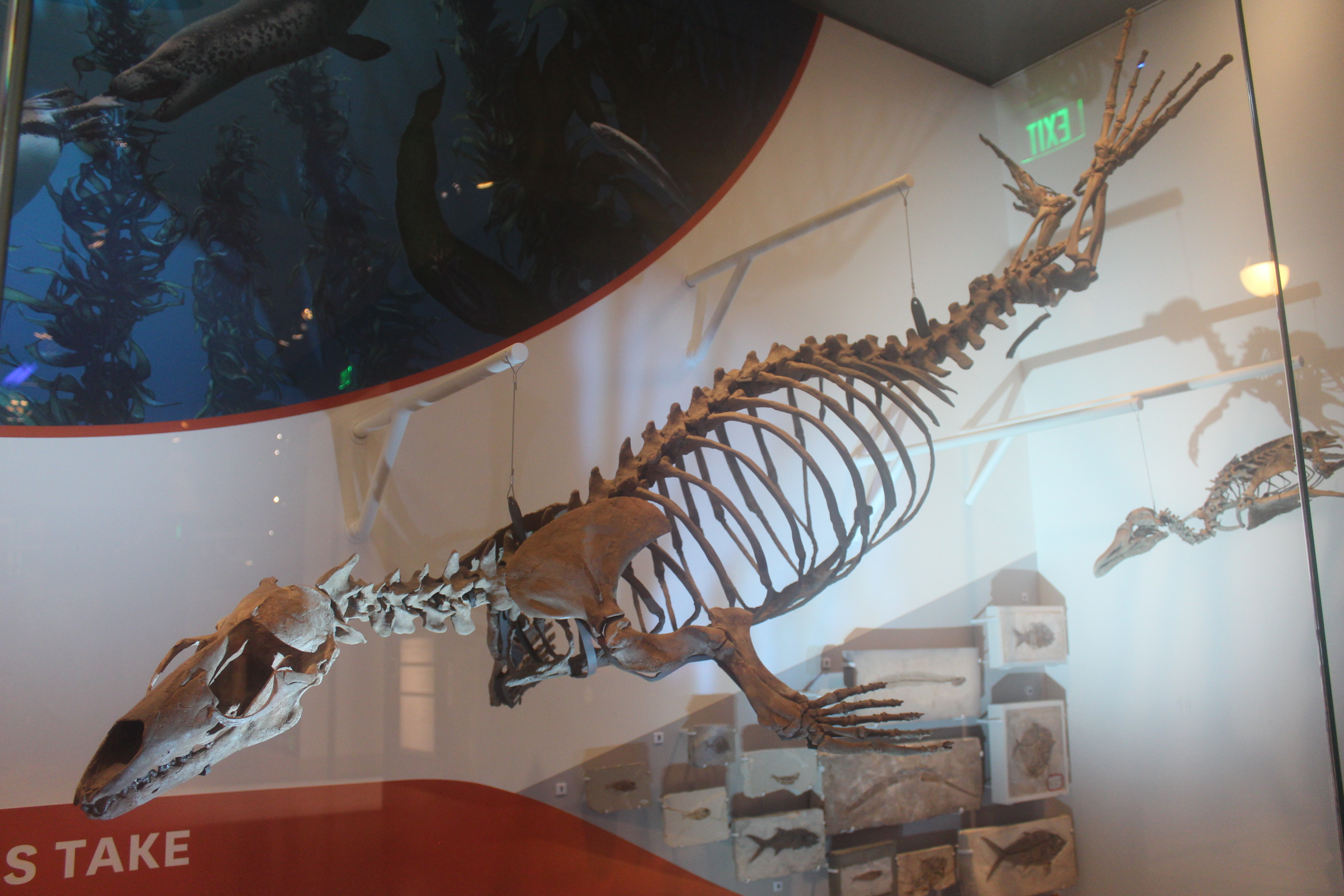
- Display at the Smithsonian National Museum of Natural History

Scientific classification
- Kingdom: Animalia
- Phylum: Chordata
- Class: Mammalia
- Infraclass: Placentalia
- Order: Carnivora
- Parvorder: Pinnipedia
- Family: Phocidae
- Subfamily: Monachinae
- Tribe: Lobodontini
- Genus: †Acrophoca; Muizon, 1981
- Species: †A. longirostris

Binomial name
- †Acrophoca longirostris Muizon, 1981

= Acrophoca =

Acrophoca Temporal range: Late Miocene ~7.246–5.332 Ma

Extinct genus of carnivores

Acrophoca longirostris, also known as the swan-necked seal, is an extinct genus of Late Miocene pinniped. It was thought to have been the ancestor of the modern leopard seal; however, it is now thought to be a species of monk seal.

== Taxonomy ==
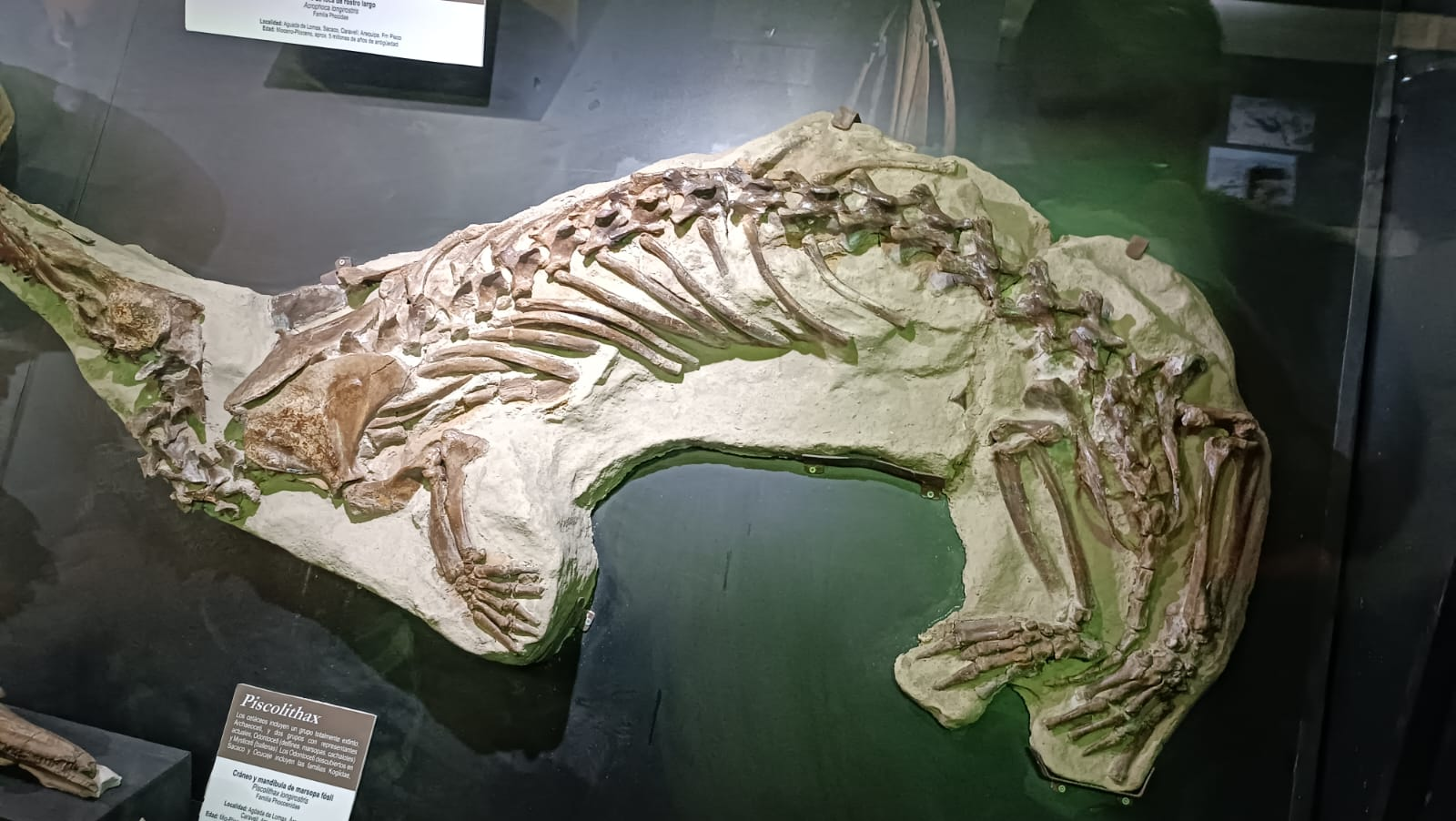
Fossil in Peru

The fossils of A. longirostris have been discovered in the Pisco Formation of Peru and the Bahía Inglesa Formation of Chile. When it was first described in 1981, it was thought to have been closely related to the lobodontine seals which includes the modern-day leopard seal (Hydrurga leptonyx), the crabeater seal (Lobodon carcinophaga), the Weddell seal (Leptonychotes weddelli) and the Ross seal (Ommatophoca rossii). However, it is now thought to be a basal species of monk seal of the subfamily Monachinae, closely related to the extinct seal Piscophoca.

== Description ==
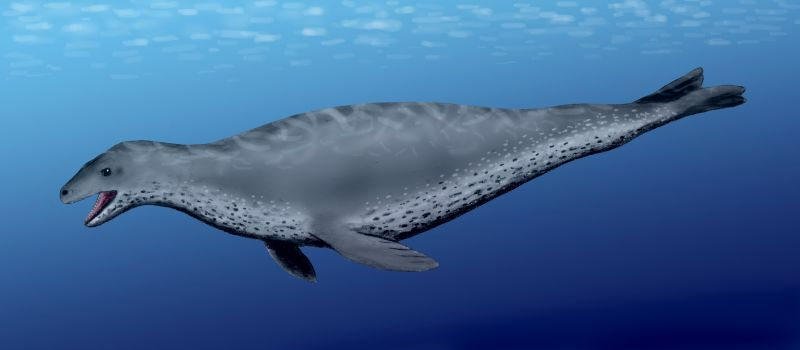
Restoration

Acrophoca was around 1.5 metres (5 ft) long, and was not as well adapted to swimming as its descendants, possessing less developed flippers and a less streamlined neck. This may indicate that it spent a lot of time near the coast. Its teeth were built for piercing, implying a diet consisted primarily of fish. However, it also had interdigitated tooth cusps causing the teeth on the upper jaw to fit with the teeth of the lower jaw, which is consistent with filter feeders. Unlike other earless seals, Acrophoca had a long and flexible neck, with an elongated body. The orientation of the pelvis, which in comparison to modern earless seals is everted, as well as adaptations to the hind limbs suggest that swimming was mainly powered by the back flippers. It was less adapted for the sea than the lobodontine seals, suggesting it inhabited nearshore waters.

== Paleoecology ==
Its fossils have been found alongside those of the marine sloth Thalassocnus and tusked cetacean Odobenocetops, as well as modern animals such as bottlenose dolphins, gannets and cormorants. Macroraptorial sperm whales capable of preying on Acrophoca, such as Acrophyseter and Livyatan melvillei, have also been discovered. And Predatory sharks such as Parotodus, Carcharodon hubbelli are also found. Acrophoca is thought to have been an important food source and formed a massive biological community in the Miocene marine ecosystem of Chile.
