= Icaphoca =

Icaphoca Temporal range: Tortonian

Scientific classification
- Kingdom: Animalia
- Phylum: Chordata
- Class: Mammalia
- Order: Carnivora
- Parvorder: Pinnipedia
- Family: Phocidae
- Genus: †Icaphoca
- Species: †I. choristodon

Binomial name
- †Icaphoca choristodon Dewaele and de Muizon, 2025

Extinct genus of lobodontin monachine

Icaphoca is an extinct monotypic genus of lobodontin seal that lived in South America during the Tortonian stage of the Late Miocene subepoch.

== Etymology ==
The generic name Icaphoca derives from the name of the city of Ica in Peru and the Greek word phoca, meaning seal. The specific epithet of the type species, Icaphoca choristodon, derives from the Greek words choristos and odontos, respectively meaning separate and tooth. The specific epithet references the substantial separation of the maxillary and mandibular postcanine teeth.
