= Magophoca =

Magophoca Temporal range: Miocene

Scientific classification
- Kingdom: Animalia
- Phylum: Chordata
- Class: Mammalia
- Order: Carnivora
- Parvorder: Pinnipedia
- Family: Phocidae
- Subfamily: Monachinae
- Genus: †Magophoca
- Species: †M. brevirostris

Binomial name
- †Magophoca brevirostris Dewaele and De Muizon, 2024

Extinct genus of mammals

Magophoca is an extinct genus of monachine carnivoran that lived in Peru during the Miocene epoch. It is a monotypic genus that contains the species M. brevirostris.
