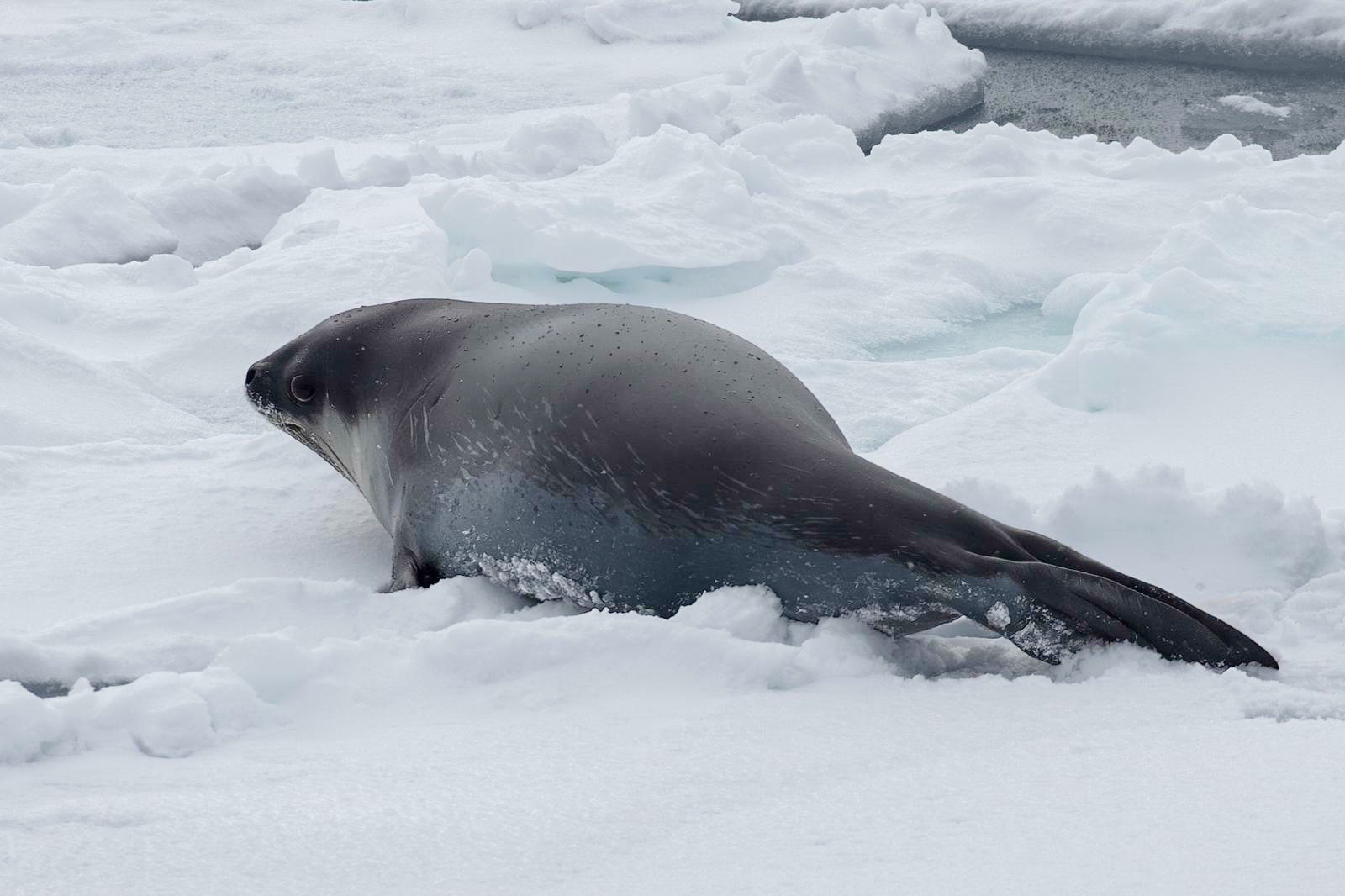
- Ross seal off Wilkes Land, Antarctica

Conservation status
- Least Concern (IUCN 3.1)

Scientific classification
- Kingdom: Animalia
- Phylum: Chordata
- Class: Mammalia
- Order: Carnivora
- Parvorder: Pinnipedia
- Family: Phocidae
- Tribe: Lobodontini
- Genus: Ommatophoca; Gray, 1844
- Species: O. rossii

Binomial name
- Ommatophoca rossii (Gray, 1844)
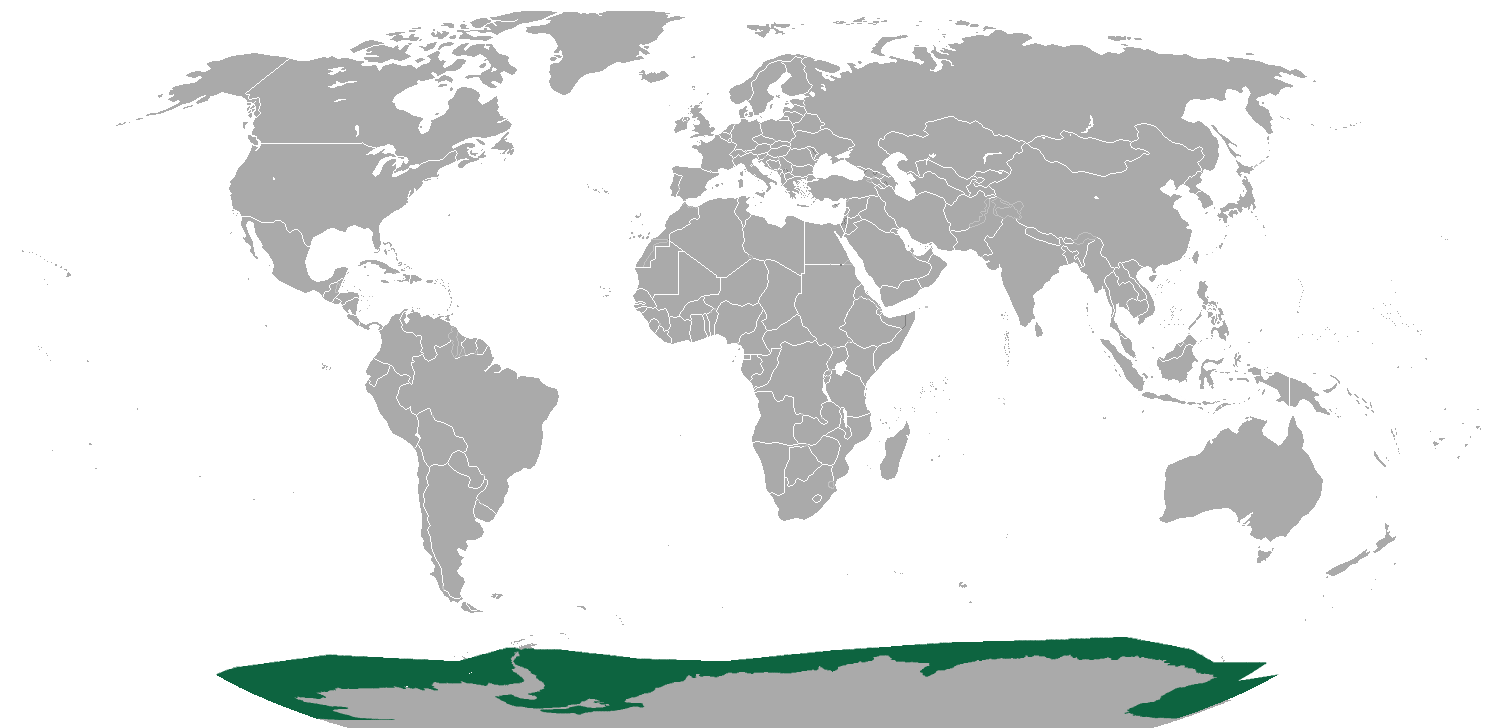
- Ross seal range

= Ross seal =

Species of mammal

The Ross seal (Ommatophoca rossii) is a true seal (family Phocidae) with a range confined entirely to the pack ice of Antarctica. It is the only species of the genus Ommatophoca. First described during the Ross expedition in 1841, it is the smallest, least abundant and least well known of the Antarctic pinnipeds. Its distinctive features include disproportionately large eyes, whence its scientific name (Ommato- meaning "eye", and phoca meaning "seal"), and complex, trilling and siren-like vocalizations. Ross seals are brachycephalic as they have a short broad muzzle, and also have shorter fur than any other seal.

== Taxonomy and evolution ==
The Ross seal shares a recent common ancestor with three other extant Antarctic seals, which are together known as the lobodontine seals. The other species are the crabeater seal (Lobodon carcinophaga), leopard seal (Hydrurga leptonyx) and Weddell seal (Leptonychotes weddelli). These species, collectively belonging to the seal tribe Lobodontini, share teeth adaptations, including lobes and cusps useful for straining smaller prey items out of the water column. The ancestral Lobodontini likely diverged from its sister clade, Mirounga (elephant seals) in the late Miocene to early Pliocene, when they migrated southward and diversified rapidly in relative isolation around Antarctica. However, the only fossils of Ross seals so far known date from much later, during the early Pleistocene of New Zealand.

== Etymology ==
The seal was named for James Clark Ross.

== Description ==
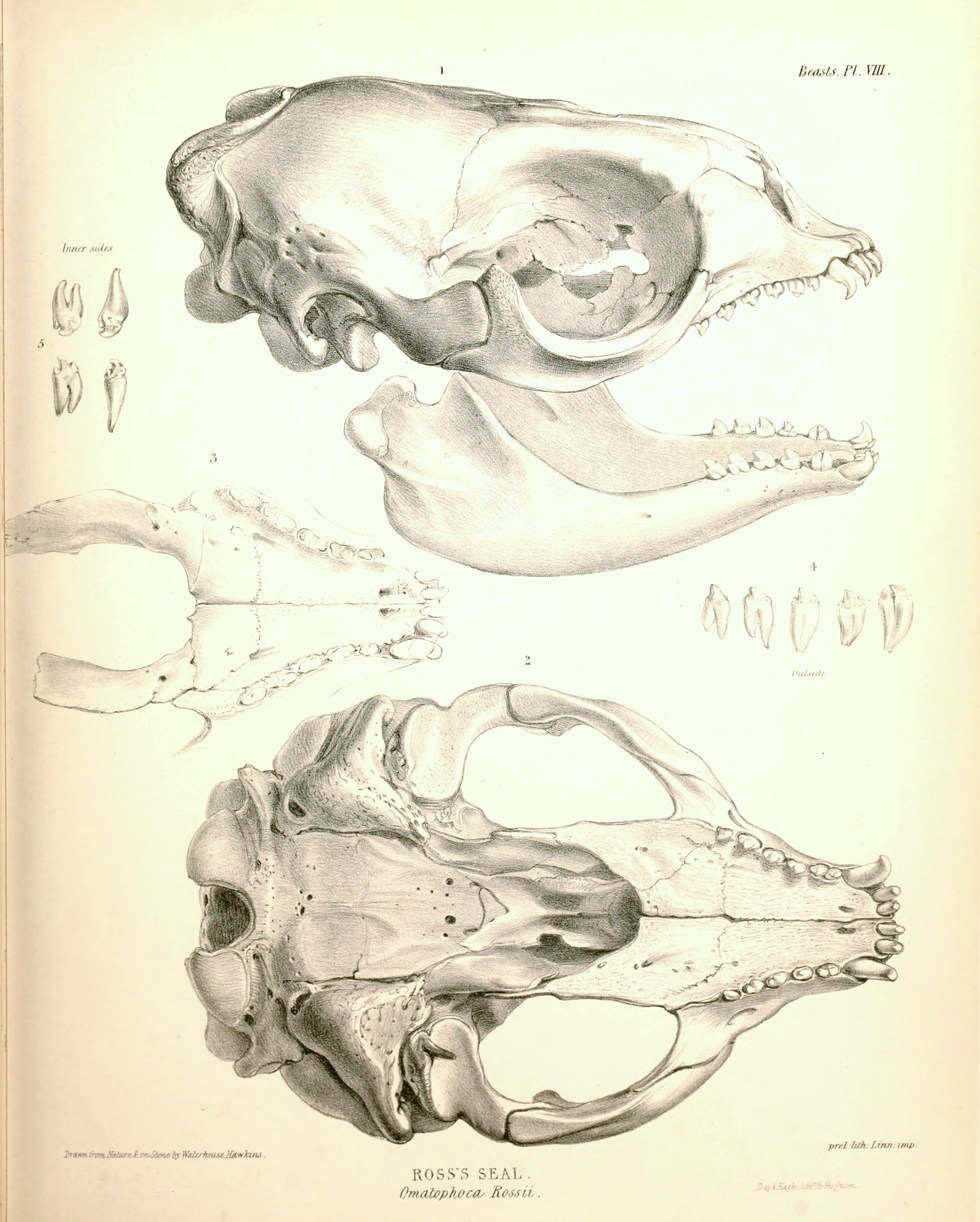
Sketch of the Ross seal skull

Ross seal males reach a length of about 1.68–2.09 m (5.5–6.9 ft) and weight of 129–216 kg (284–476 lb); females are slightly larger at 1.96–2.5 m (6.4–8.2 ft). A molecular genetic based technique has been established to confirm the sex of individuals in the laboratory. Pups are about 1 m (3.3 ft) and 16 kg (35 lb) at birth. The coat is colored dark-brown in the dorsal area and silvery-white beneath. At the onset of the Antarctic winter, the coat fades gradually to become light brown. At close range, the Ross seal can be easily identified by its large eyes, which are up to 7 cm (2.8 in) in diameter. In comparison to other Monachinae, Ross seals have a short muzzle.

The Ross seal is able to produce a variety of complex twittering and siren-like sounds that are performed on ice and underwater, where they carry for long distances. The underwater siren sound can be composed of two harmonically unrelated superimposed tones that are pulsed with the same rhythm. Uniquely, the vocalizations, whether on ice or in water, are made with a closed mouth—emitting no air. The purpose of these sounds is unknown, though their distinctive nature and long range are likely to facilitate either encounters or avoidance of individuals.

Compared to other earless seals, the Ross seal has reduced semicircular canals and parafollicular volume. These traits are adapted because of their preferred aquatic lifestyle.

== Range and population status ==
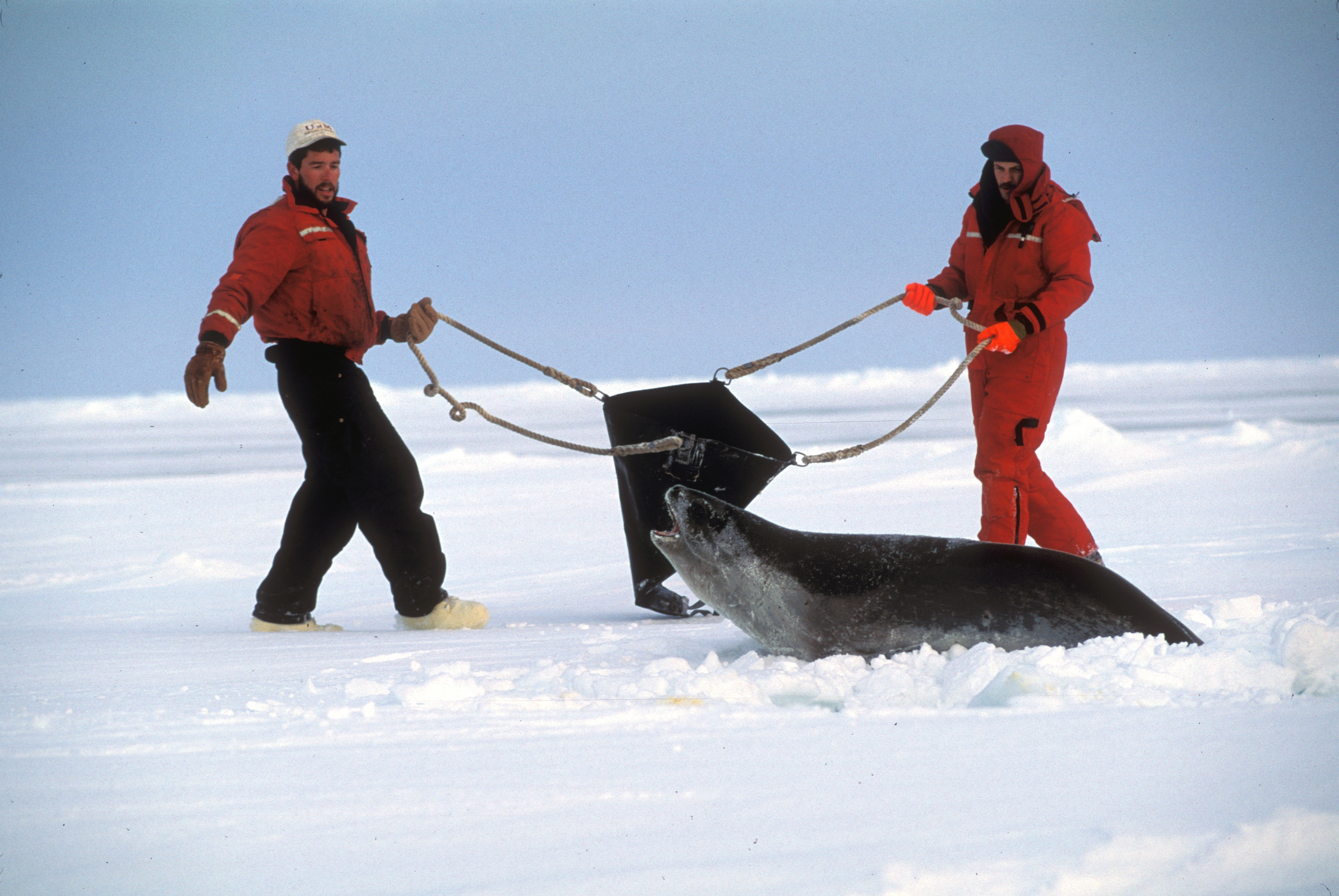
Researchers attempting to capture a Ross seal in the Ross Sea

Although its close relatives Weddell seals, crabeater seals and leopard seals are ubiquitous in Antarctic waters, the Ross seal is an uncommon and relatively unknown animal, considered to be the least common pack ice seal. It almost never leaves the Antarctic Ocean, with the very rare exception of stray animals found around subantarctic islands, and uniquely, off the south coast of Australia. Evidence suggests the seal inhabit the pack ice in the Weddell Sea as well, though only in the Spring during breeding seasons. Nonetheless, its distribution is circumpolar, with individuals found in low densities—usually singly—in very thick pack ice in all regions of the continent.

The total Ross seal population is estimated at around 130,000 individuals, but there is great uncertainty in this estimate (reported 95% confidence intervals range from 20,000 to 227,000). Thus, very little is known about trends in the population. A genetic survey did not detect evidence of a recent, sustained genetic bottleneck in this species, which suggests that populations do not appear to have suffered a detectable and sustained decline in the recent past.

Interactions with humans have been limited. They have been collected historically by Antarctic expeditions and for scientific collections. Their range does not generally overlap with commercial fishing.

== Feeding and reproductive behavior ==
Ross seal feeds primarily on 19% invertebrates, 47% squid and 34% fish, primarily Antarctic silverfish, in the pelagic zone. Competition with whales or other arctic seals reduces their highly specialized diet. Ross seals are presumed to be preyed upon by killer whales (Orcinus orca) and leopard seals, large predators that share their Antarctic habitat, though there are no documented observations of predation. Haul-out behavior among Ross seals varies seasonally, with a preference for midday haul-outs observed in certain months (September, October, February, and December). The Ross seal is a solitary species, therefore they do not gather in large breeding season. Additionally, during the breeding season, female seals entering the pack ice engage in continuous haul-outs lasting 5 to 7 days. These periods are occasionally interrupted by brief water entries lasting 1 to 3 hours, indicating a potential alternation between capital and facultative income breeding strategies.

Females give birth to their young on the ice in November. Ross seal pups are taken care of on the ice rather than water where they are less likely to be attacked. Pups are nursed for only four weeks before weaning. Mating is thought to occur underwater shortly after the pup is weaned, but has never been observed. The species is more resilient towards ice loss because of their extensive use of water over ice for the majority of their life. Ross seals mature sexually at approximately three years of age, and are thought to live around 20 years in the wild.
