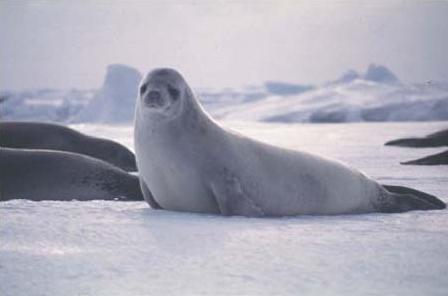
- Crabeater seal, Lobodon carcinophaga

Scientific classification
- Kingdom: Animalia
- Phylum: Chordata
- Class: Mammalia
- Order: Carnivora
- Parvorder: Pinnipedia
- Family: Phocidae
- Subfamily: Monachinae
- Tribe: Lobodontini; J. E. Gray, 1869

Genera
- Hydrurga; Leptonychotes; Lobodon; Ommatophoca; †Icaphoca; †Magophoca

= Lobodontini =

Lobodontine seals Temporal range: Late Miocene to recent

Tribe of carnivores

The true seal tribe Lobodontini, collectively known as the Antarctic seals or lobodontin seals, consist of four species of seals in four genera: the crabeater seal (Lobodon carcinophaga), the leopard seal (Hydrurga leptonyx), the Weddell seal (Leptonychotes weddelli), and the Ross seal (Ommatophoca rossii). All lobodontine seals have circumpolar distributions surrounding Antarctica. They include both the world's most abundant seal (the crabeater seal) and the only predominantly mammal-eating seal (the leopard seal). While the Weddell seal prefers the shore-fast ice, the other species live primarily on and around the off-shore pack ice. Thus, though they are collectively the most abundant group of seals in the world, the combination of remote range and inaccessible habitat make them among the least well-studied of the world's seals.

== Adaptations ==
Schematic of crabeater seal skull teeth, illustrating the unique krill-filtering lobes and cusps

The Lobodontini are thought to have diverged from the elephant seals (Mirounga) during the late Miocene in the Southern Ocean. The leopard and crabeater seals possess lobes and cusps on their teeth useful for straining smaller prey items out of the water (the name "Lobodontini", meaning "lobe-toothed"). Nonetheless, they have diversified into specialized prey ecological niches, thereby illustrating the radiating sympatric speciation associated with colonization of a novel environment with multiple available niches. Thus, the crabeater seal, with the most specialized sieve-like dental features, is the only seal that feeds predominantly on Antarctic krill, while the leopard seal is the only seal which actively preys on other seals and penguins, while still retaining the ability to filter-feed on krill.

== Abundance ==
The lobodontin seals in aggregate are among the most successful of all marine mammal groups, collectively accounting for at least 50% of all seals on Earth and about 80% of the global biomass of pinnipeds. The extremely high abundance of crabeater seals in particular, with possibly over 30,000,000 individuals, is a testament to the high productivity of the Southern Ocean, especially with respect to krill. High numbers of seals may also be the indirect result of the wide-scale extermination of large baleen whales in the Antarctic due to commercial whaling in the 19th and 20th centuries, and the subsequent increase in krill densities. Genetic evidence suggests that Weddell and crabeater seal populations may have increased in size during the Pleistocene. None of the four species are currently thought to be declining in numbers.

Skulls

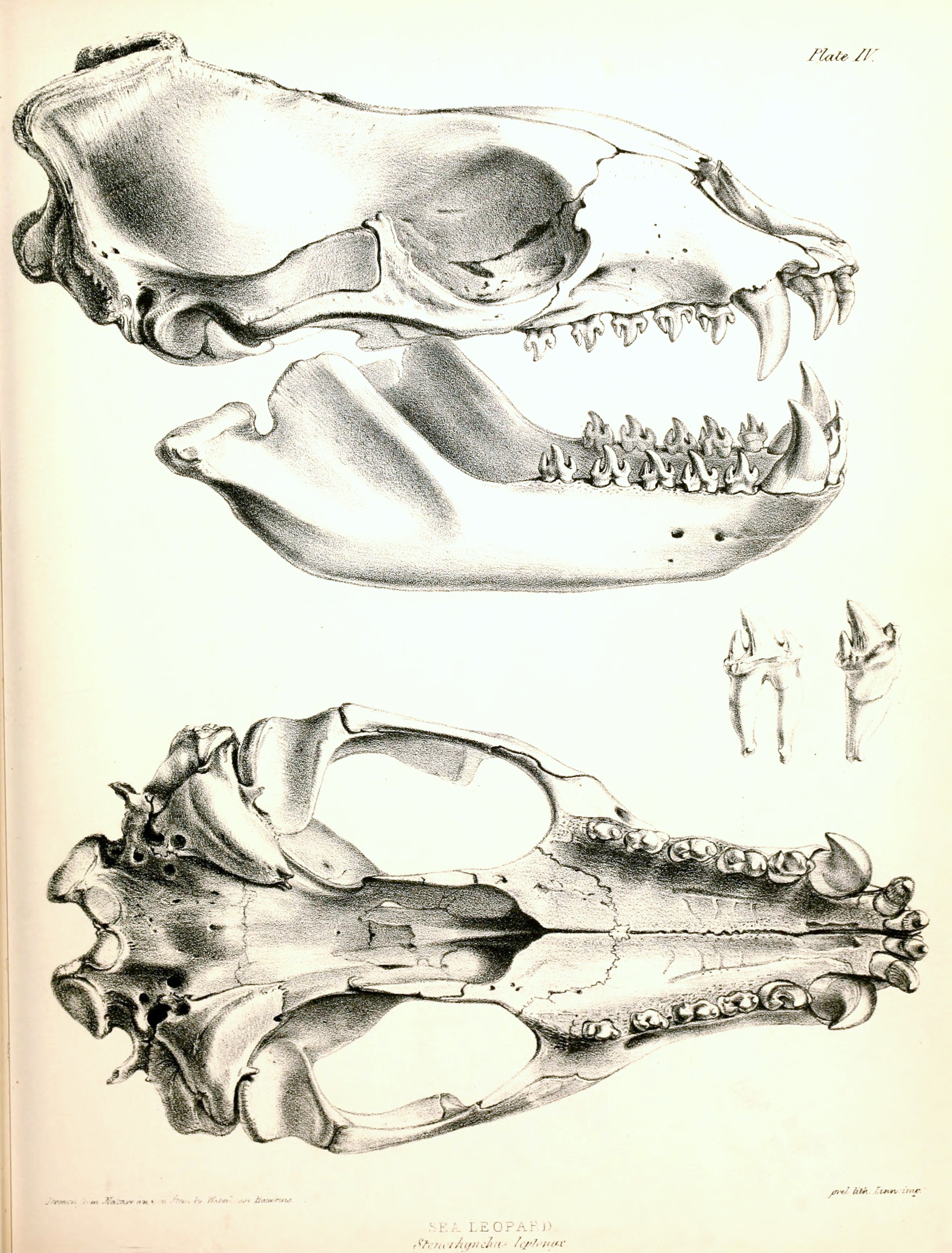
Leopard seal
(Hydrurga leptonyx)

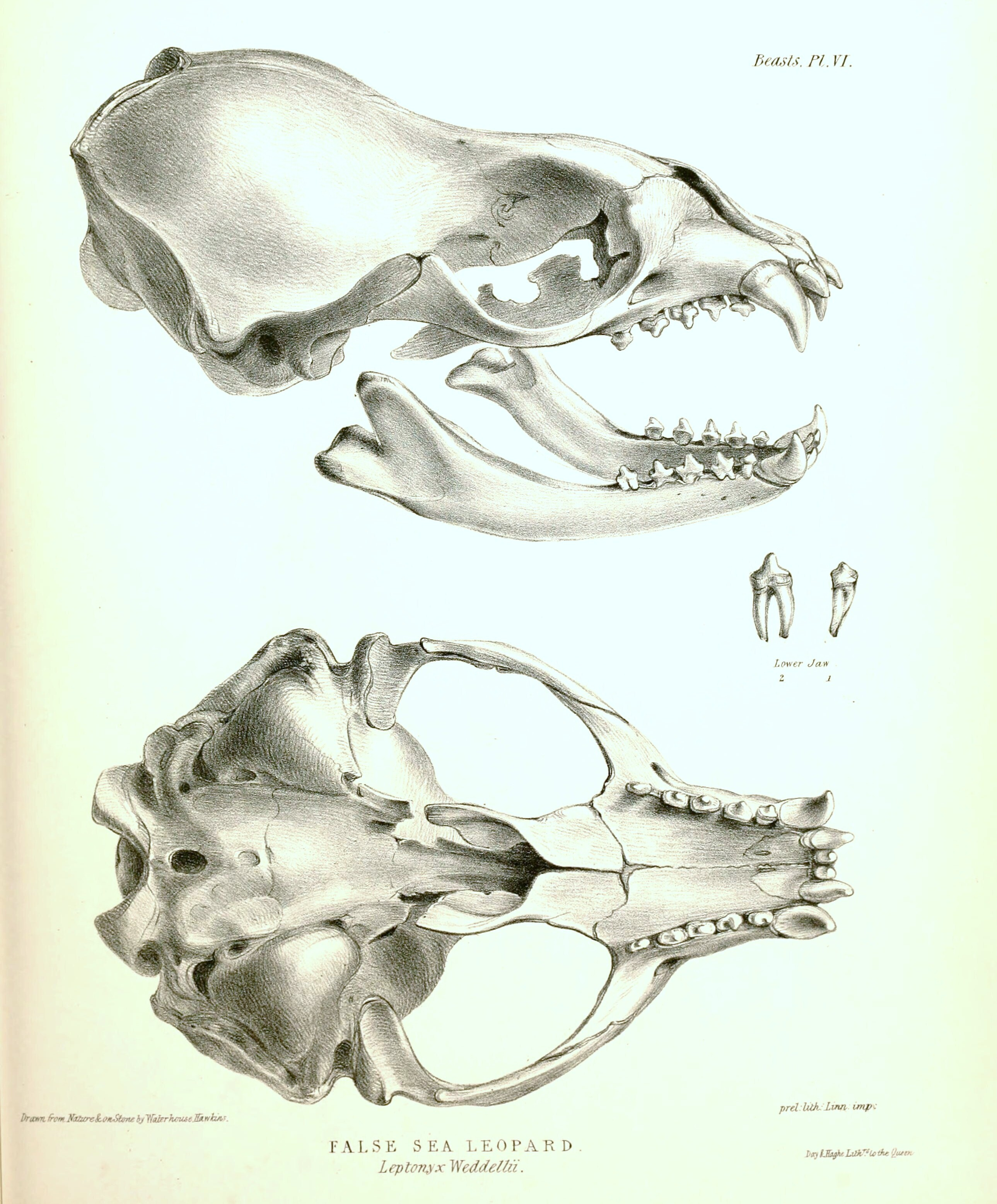
Weddell seal
(Leptonychotes weddellii)

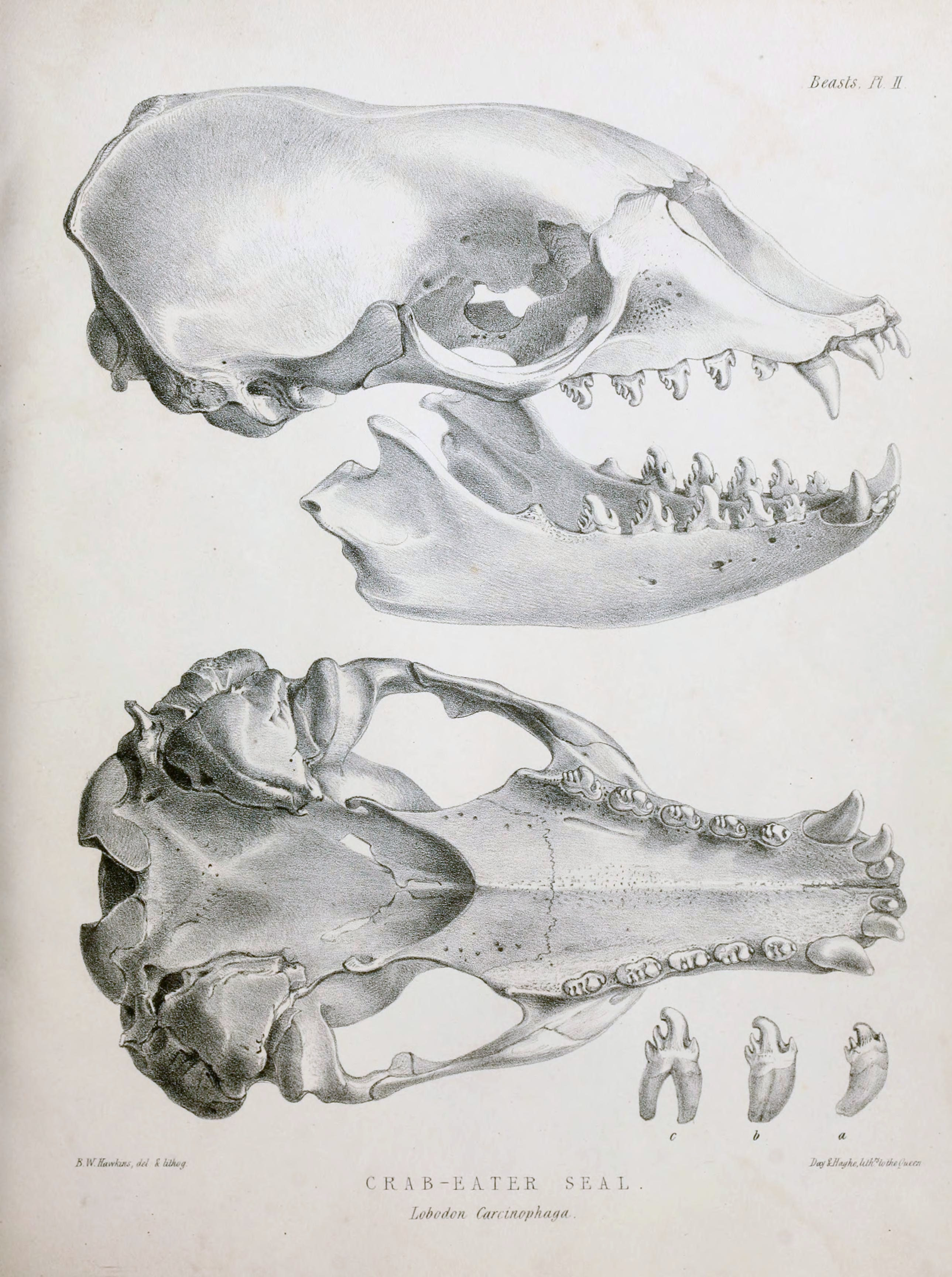
Crabeater seal
(Lobodon carcinophaga)

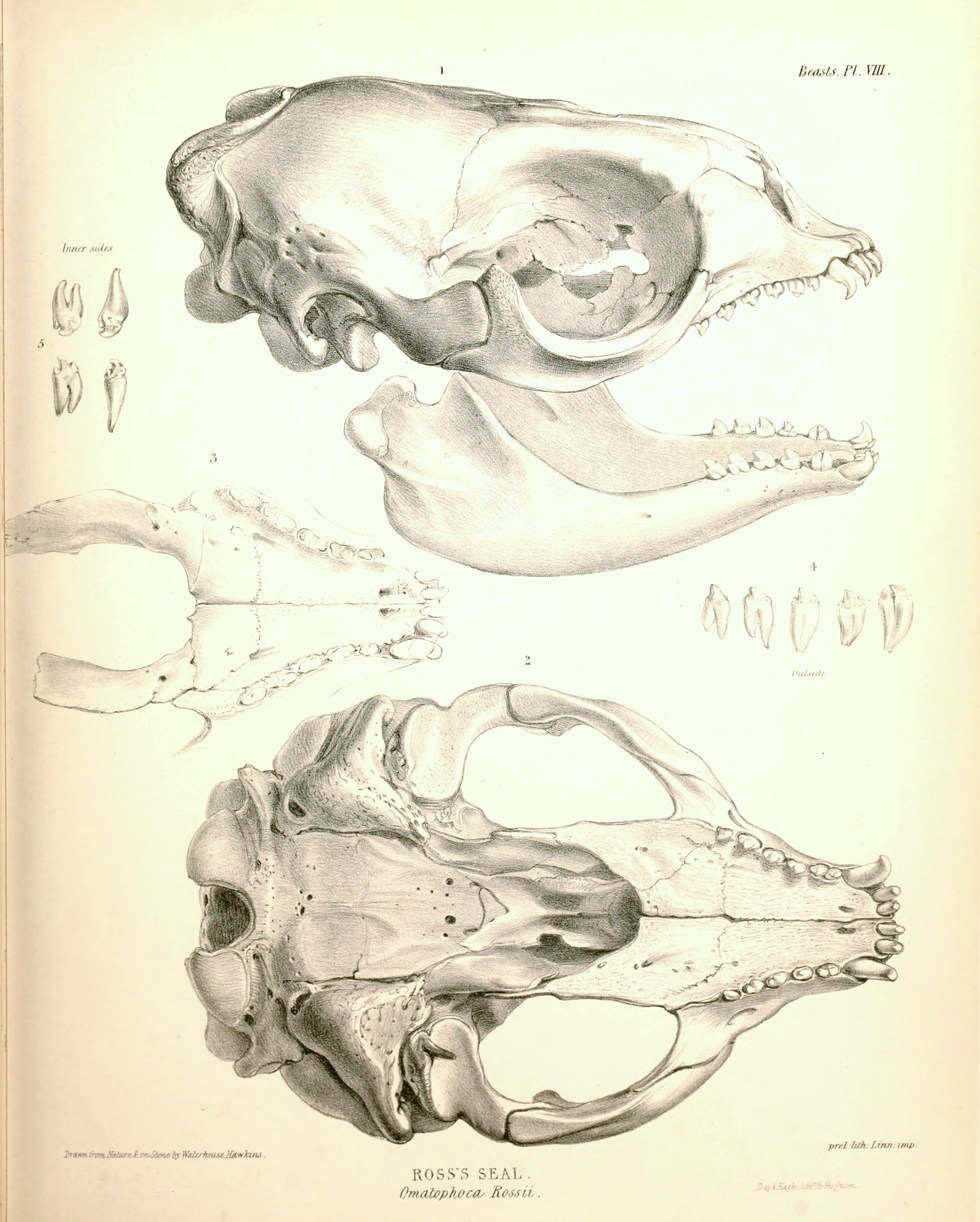
Ross seal
(Ommatophoca rossii)

== Genera ==
Image	Genus	Species
	Lobodon Gray, 1844	Crabeater seal (Lobodon carcinophaga)
	Hydrurga Gistel, 1848	Leopard seal (Hydrurga leptonyx)
	Ommatophoca Gray, 1844	Ross seal (Ommatophoca rossii)
	Leptonychotes Gill, 1872	Weddell seal (Leptonychotes weddellii)
