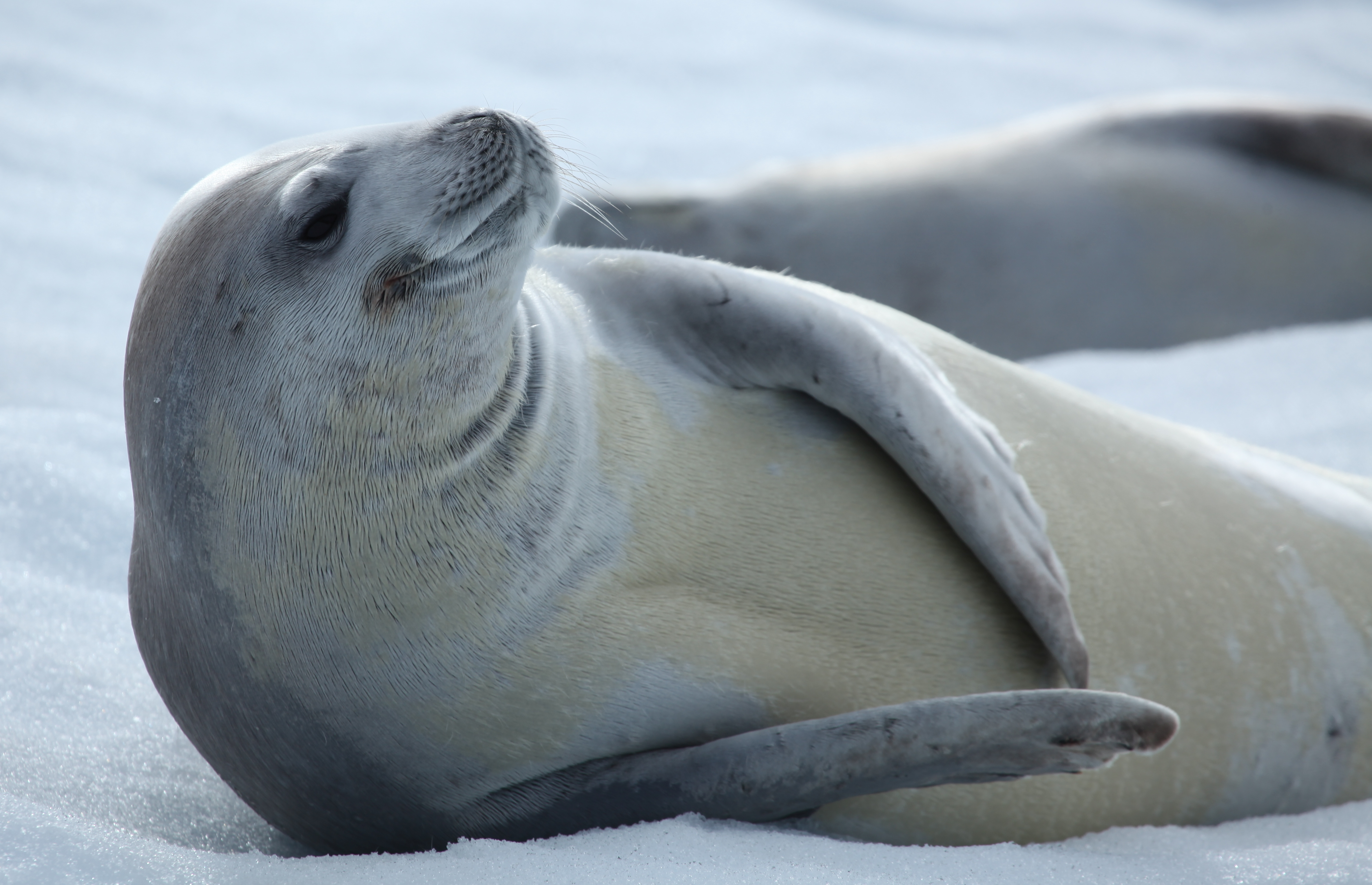
- Crabeater seal, Lobodon carcinophaga
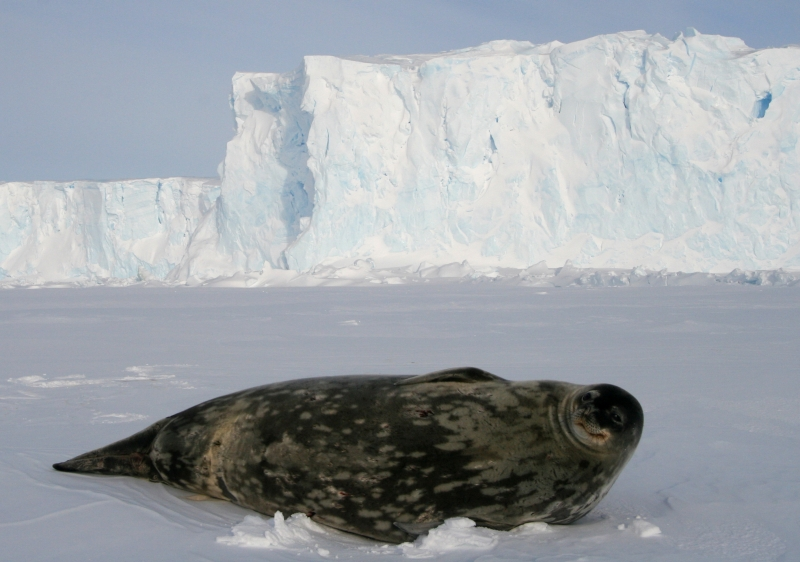
- Weddell seal, Leptonychotes weddellii

Scientific classification
- Kingdom: Animalia
- Phylum: Chordata
- Class: Mammalia
- Infraclass: Placentalia
- Order: Carnivora
- Parvorder: Pinnipedia
- Family: Phocidae
- Subfamily: Monachinae; E. L. Trouessart, 1897

Tribes
- Monachini E. L. Trouessart, 1897; Miroungini Muizon, 1981; Lobodontini J. E. Gray, 1869

= Monachinae =

Southern seals Temporal range: Aquitanian–present Early Miocene – Holocene, possible late Oligocene record

Subfamily of carnivores

Monachinae (known colloquially as southern seals) is a subfamily of Phocidae whose distribution is found in the tropical, temperate and polar regions of the Southern Hemisphere, though in the distant past fossil representatives have been found on both sides of the North Atlantic Ocean. The difference between members of this group and members of Phocinae is in monachines the hindclaws are greatly reduced in size. Furthermore, all species have 34 chromosomes. There are three tribes recognized here: Monachini (monk seals), Miroungini (elephant seals), and Lobodontini (Antarctic seals and a handful of Afroamerican fossil genera). While today represented by eight extant and one recently extinct species, Monachinae had an incredibly enriched fossil diversity that went into decline soon to be replaced by southern species of sea lions and fur seals.
