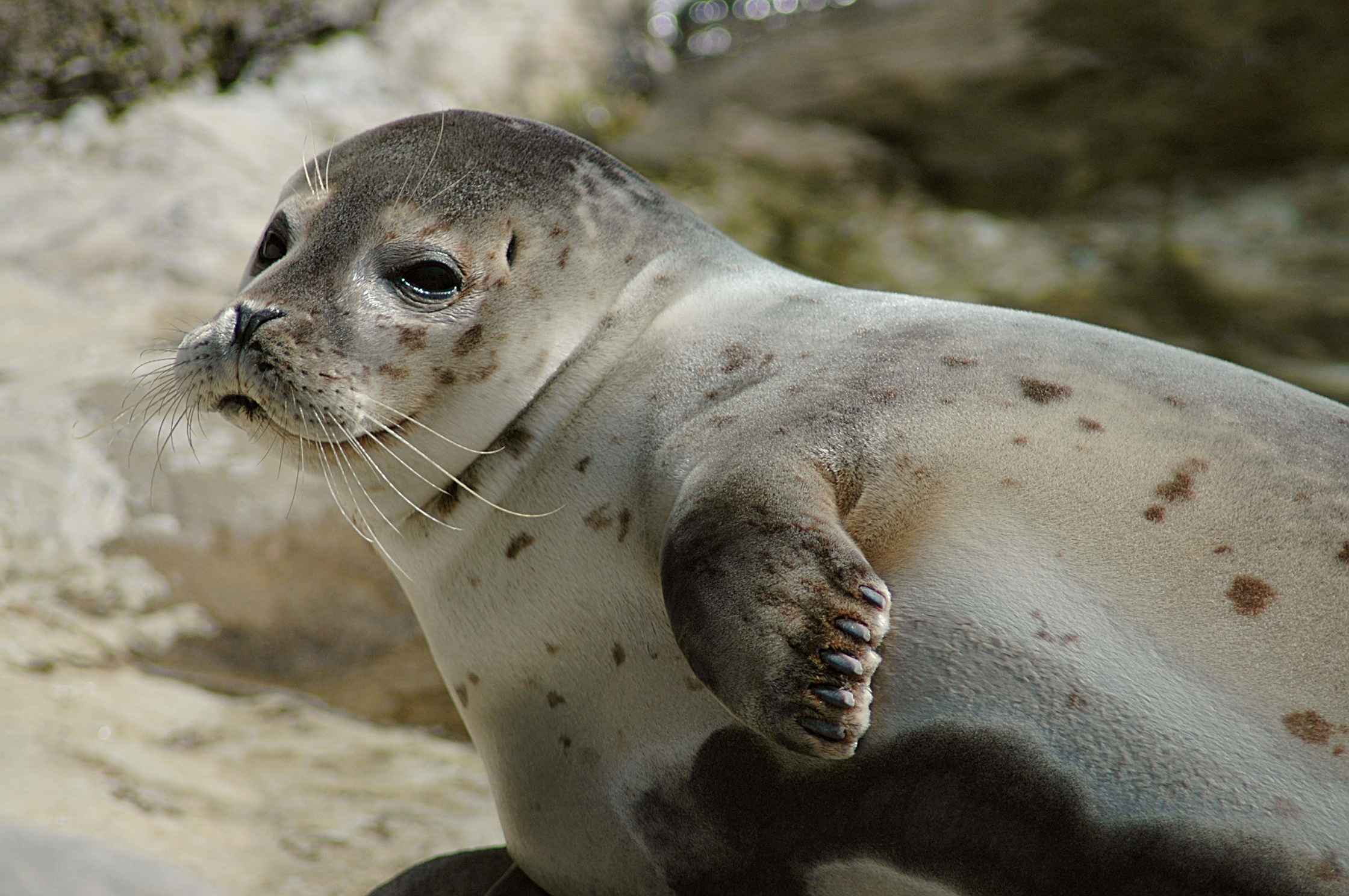
- Harbor seal, Phoca vitulina

Scientific classification
- Kingdom: Animalia
- Phylum: Chordata
- Class: Mammalia
- Order: Carnivora
- Parvorder: Pinnipedia
- Superfamily: Phocoidea
- Family: Phocidae; Gray, 1821

Type genus
- Phoca Linnaeus, 1758

Subfamilies
- †Devinophocinae; Monachinae; Phocinae
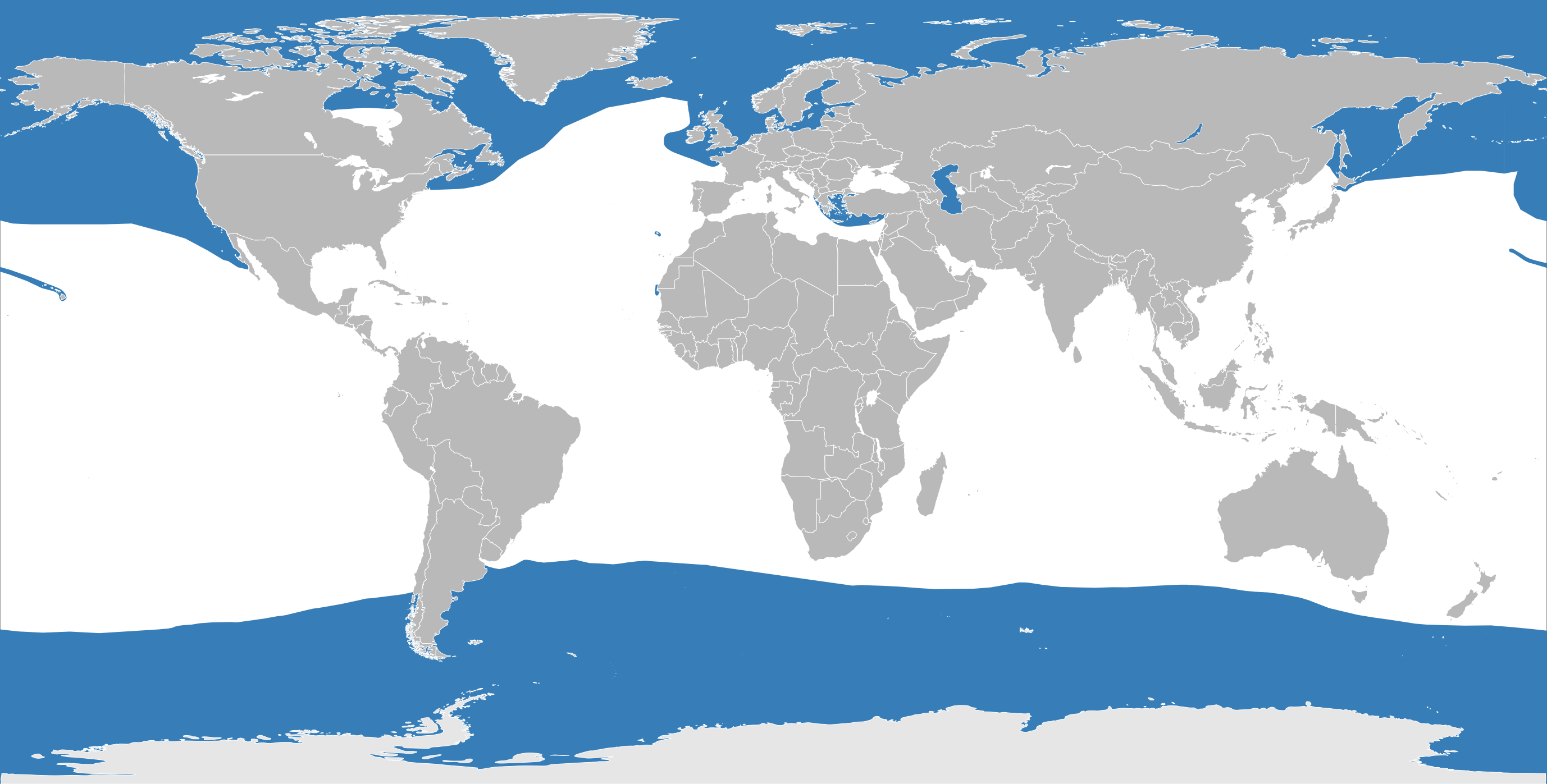
- Phocidae distribution

= Earless seal =

Earless seals Temporal range: Aquitanian–present Early Miocene – Holocene, possible late Oligocene record

Family of mammals

The earless seals, also known as phocids or true seals, are one of the three main groups of mammals within the seal lineage, Pinnipedia. All true seals are members of the family Phocidae (/ˈfoʊsɪdiː/). They are sometimes called crawling seals to distinguish them from the fur seals and sea lions of the family Otariidae. Seals live in the oceans of both hemispheres and, with the exception of the more tropical monk seals, are mostly confined to polar, subpolar, and temperate climates. The Baikal seal is the only species of exclusively freshwater seal.

== Taxonomy and evolution ==
=== Evolution ===
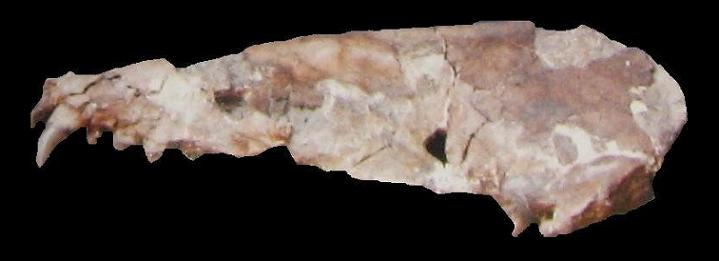
Fossil Pliophoca skull

The earliest known fossil earless seal is Noriphoca gaudini from the late Oligocene or earliest Miocene (Aquitanian) of Italy. Other early fossil phocids date from the mid-Miocene, 15 million years ago in the north Atlantic. Until recently, many researchers believed that phocids evolved separately from otariids and odobenids; and that they evolved from otter-like animals, such as Potamotherium, which inhabited European freshwater lakes. Recent evidence strongly suggests a monophyletic origin for all pinnipeds from a single ancestor, possibly Enaliarctos, most closely related to the mustelids and bears.

Monk seals and elephant seals were previously believed to have first entered the Pacific through the open straits between North and South America, with the Antarctic true seals either using the same route or travelled down the west coast of Africa. It is now thought that the monk seals, elephant seals, and Antarctic seals all evolved in the southern hemisphere, and likely dispersed to their current distributions from more southern latitudes.

=== Taxonomy ===
- Pinnipedia
  - Phocidae
    - Phocinae
      - Bearded seal
      - - Hooded seal
        - Phocini
          - - - - - Ringed seal
                  - Baikal seal
                - Caspian seal
              - - Spotted seal
                - Harbor seal
            - Grey seal
          - - Ribbon seal
            - Harp seal
    - Monachinae
      - - Lobodontini
          - - - Weddell seal
              - Leopard seal
            - Crabeater seal
          - Ross seal
        - Miroungini (elephant seals)
          - Southern elephant seal
          - Northern elephant seal
      - Monachini
        - Mediterranean monk seal
        - - Hawaiian monk seal
          - Caribbean monk seal
  - - Otariidae (eared seals)
    - Odobenidae (Walrus)

Cladogram showing relationships among the phocids, combining several phylogenetic analyses.

In the 1980s and 1990s, morphological phylogenetic analysis of the phocids led to new conclusions about the interrelatedness of the various genera. More recent molecular phylogenetic analyses have confirmed the monophyly of the two phocid subfamilies (Phocinae and Monachinae). The Monachinae (known as the "southern" seals), is composed of three tribes; the Lobodontini, Miroungini, and Monachini. The four Antarctic genera Hydrurga, Leptonychotes, Lobodon, and Ommatophoca are part of the tribe Lobodontini. Tribe Miroungini is composed of the elephant seals. The monk seals (Monachus and Neomonachus) are all part of the tribe Monachini. Likewise, subfamily Phocinae (the "northern" seals) also includes three tribes; Erignathini (Erignathus), Cystophorini (Cystophora), and Phocini (all other phocines). More recently, five species have been split off from Phoca, forming three additional genera.

Alternatively the three monachine tribes have been evaluated to familiar status, which elephant seals and the Antarctic seals are more closely related to the phocines.

=== Extant genera ===
Subfamily	Tribe	Image	Genus	species
Subfamily Monachinae	Tribe Monachini		Monachus Fleming, 1822	Mediterranean monk seal, Monachus monachus
Subfamily Monachinae	Tribe Monachini		Neomonachus Slater & Helgen, 2014	Hawaiian monk seal, Neomonachus schauinslandi
Subfamily Monachinae	Tribe Miroungini		Mirounga Gray, 1827	Northern elephant seal, Mirounga angustirostris; Southern elephant seal, Mirounga leonina
Subfamily Monachinae	Tribe Lobodontini		Ommatophoca Gray, 1844	Ross seal, Ommatophoca rossi
Subfamily Monachinae	Tribe Lobodontini		Lobodon Gray, 1844	Crabeater seal, Lobodon carcinophaga
Subfamily Monachinae	Tribe Lobodontini		Hydrurga Gistel, 1848	Leopard seal, Hydrurga leptonyx
Subfamily Monachinae	Tribe Lobodontini		Leptonychotes Gill, 1872	Weddell seal, Leptonychotes weddellii
Subfamily Phocinae	Tribe Cystophorini		Cystophora Nilsson, 1820	Hooded seal, Cystophora cristata
Subfamily Phocinae	Tribe Erignathini		Erignathus Gill, 1866	Bearded seal, Erignathus barbatus
Subfamily Phocinae	Tribe Phocini		Phoca Linnaeus, 1758	Harbor seal or common seal, Phoca vitulina; Spotted seal, Phoca largha
Subfamily Phocinae	Tribe Phocini		Pusa Scopoli, 1771	Ringed seal, Pusa hispida (formerly Phoca hispida); Baikal seal, Pusa sibirica (formerly Phoca sibirica); Caspian seal, Pusa caspica (formerly Phoca caspica); Saimaa ringed seal, Pusa saimensis (formerly Pusa hispida saimensis)
Subfamily Phocinae	Tribe Phocini		Pagophilus Gray, 1844	Harp seal, Pagophilus groenlandicus (formerly Phoca groenlandica)
Subfamily Phocinae	Tribe Phocini		Histriophoca Gill, 1873	Ribbon seal, Histriophoca fasciata (formerly Phoca fasciata)
Subfamily Phocinae	Tribe Phocini		Halichoerus Nilsson, 1820	Grey seal, Halichoerus grypus

== Biology ==
=== External anatomy ===
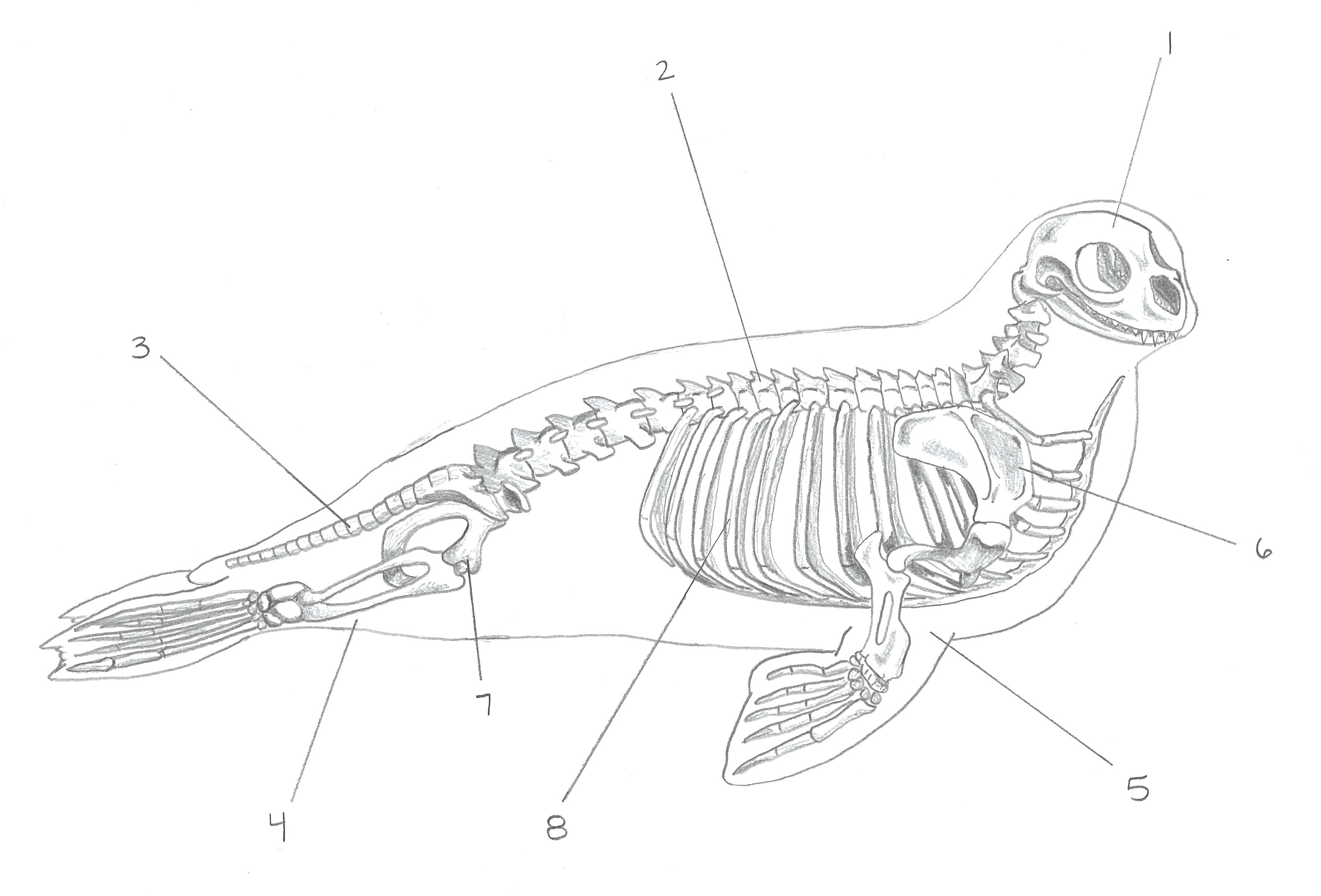
Skeletal anatomy of a harbor seal. 1. Skull. 2. Spine. 3. Tail. 4. Hindlimb. 5. Forelimb. 6. Shoulder. 7. Pelvis. 8. Rib cage.

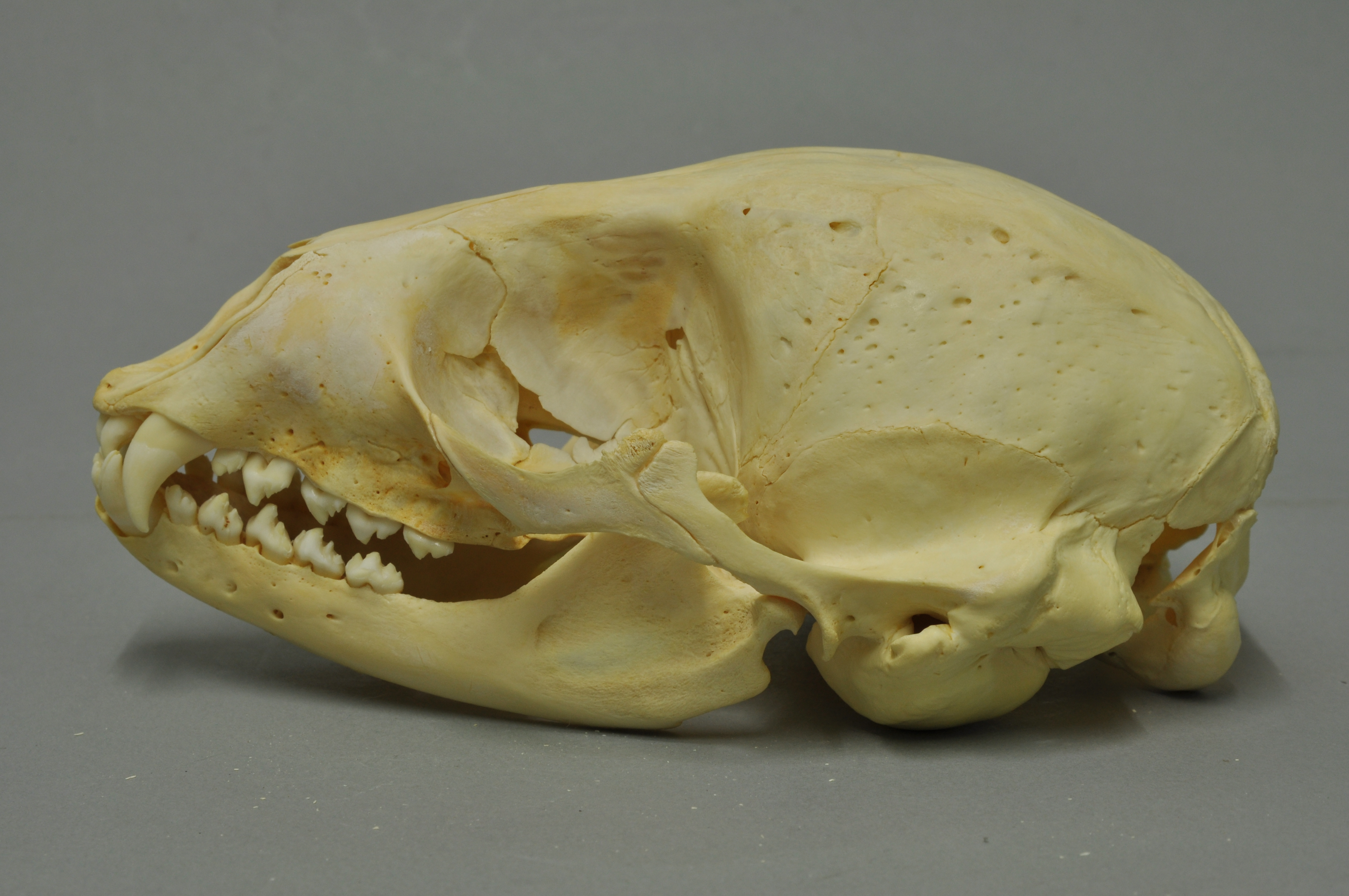
Harbor seal skull (Phoca vitulina)

Adult phocids vary from 1.17 m (3.8 ft) in length and 45 kg (99 lb) in weight in the ringed seal to 5.8 m (19 ft) and 4,000 kg (8,800 lb) in the southern elephant seal, the largest member of the order Carnivora. Phocids have fewer teeth than land-based members of the Carnivora, although they retain powerful canines. Some species lack molars altogether. The dental formula is: 2–3.1.4.0–21–2.1.4.0–2

While otariids are known for speed and maneuverability, phocids are known for efficient, economical movement. This allows most phocids to forage far from land to exploit prey resources, while otariids are tied to rich upwelling zones close to breeding sites. Phocids swim in a sideways motion with their bodies; their fore flippers are primarily used for steering, whereas their hind flippers are used for underwater propulsion. While phocids' streamlined bodies make them better long-distance swimmers than otariids, unlike fur seals, their hind flippers are bound to the pelvis and unable to be rotated forward for walking. As a result, they are clumsy on land, having to wriggle with their front flippers and abdominal muscles.

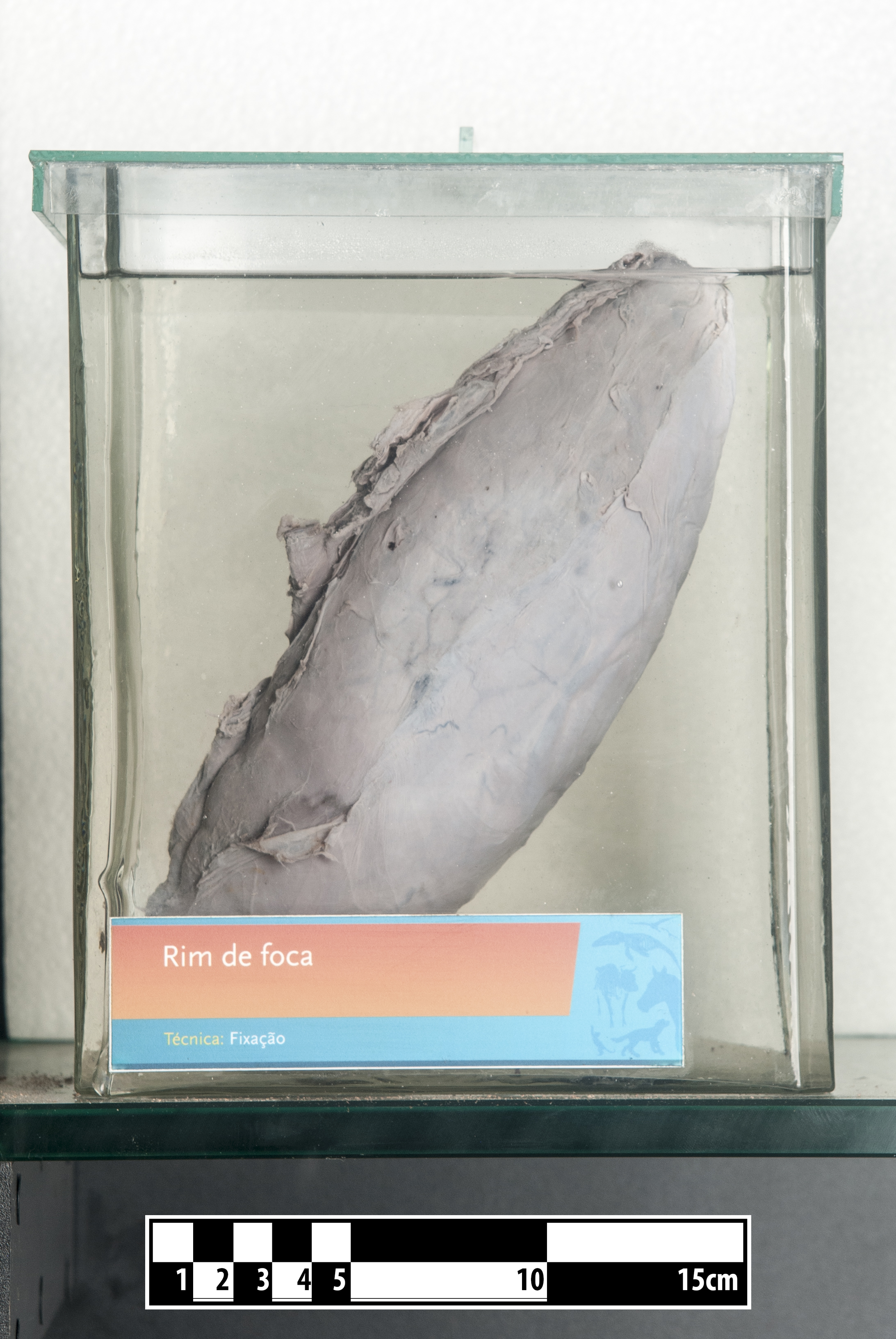
Seal kidney

Phocid respiratory and circulatory systems are adapted to facilitate diving into considerable depths, allowing them to spend long periods of time underwater. When a seal dives, air is forced from the lungs and into the upper respiratory passages, where gases cannot easily be absorbed into the bloodstream, protecting it from the bends. The middle ear is also lined with blood sinuses that inflate during diving, helping to maintain a constant pressure.

Phocid bodies are more specialized for aquatic life than otariids, as supported by the presence of ear holes (as opposed to external ears in fur seals), retractable nipples, internal testicles, and an internal penile sheath. Phocids are able to divert blood flow to a smooth layer of blubber underneath their skin to help regulate body temperature.

=== Communication ===
Unlike otariids, phocine seals do not communicate by "barking". Instead, they communicate by slapping the water and grunting, with a few species having been documented to clap at each other underwater. One study published in Animal Behaviour found that seals use rhythmic percussive signalling (clapping) in both "agonistic interactions" and display behavior.

Conversely, monachine seals are well known to vocalize: Elephant seals often vocalize on land, with the bulls being well known for roaring to establish dominance and identify themselves. The Weddell and leopard seals are well known for their underwater singing.

=== Movements ===
With short front flippers and because their rear flipper is unable to rotate, true seals cannot walk when out of the water like sea lions. As a result, they bounce themselves forward in a motion called galumphing; the polar explorer Edward Wilson referred to the motion as lolloping. It is also referred to as "worm-style" locomotion.

=== Reproduction ===
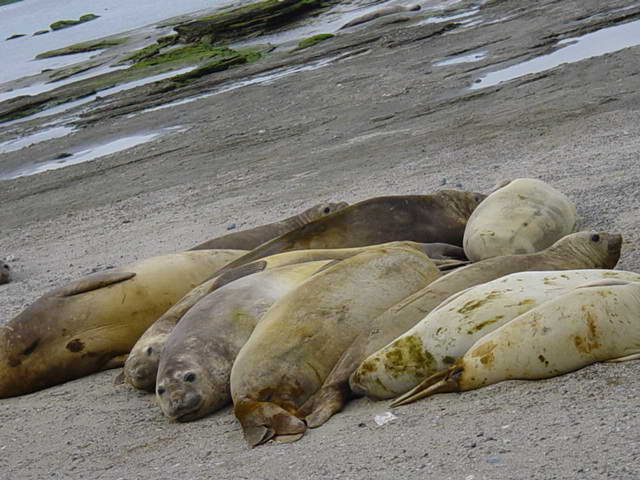
Southern elephant seals in Argentina

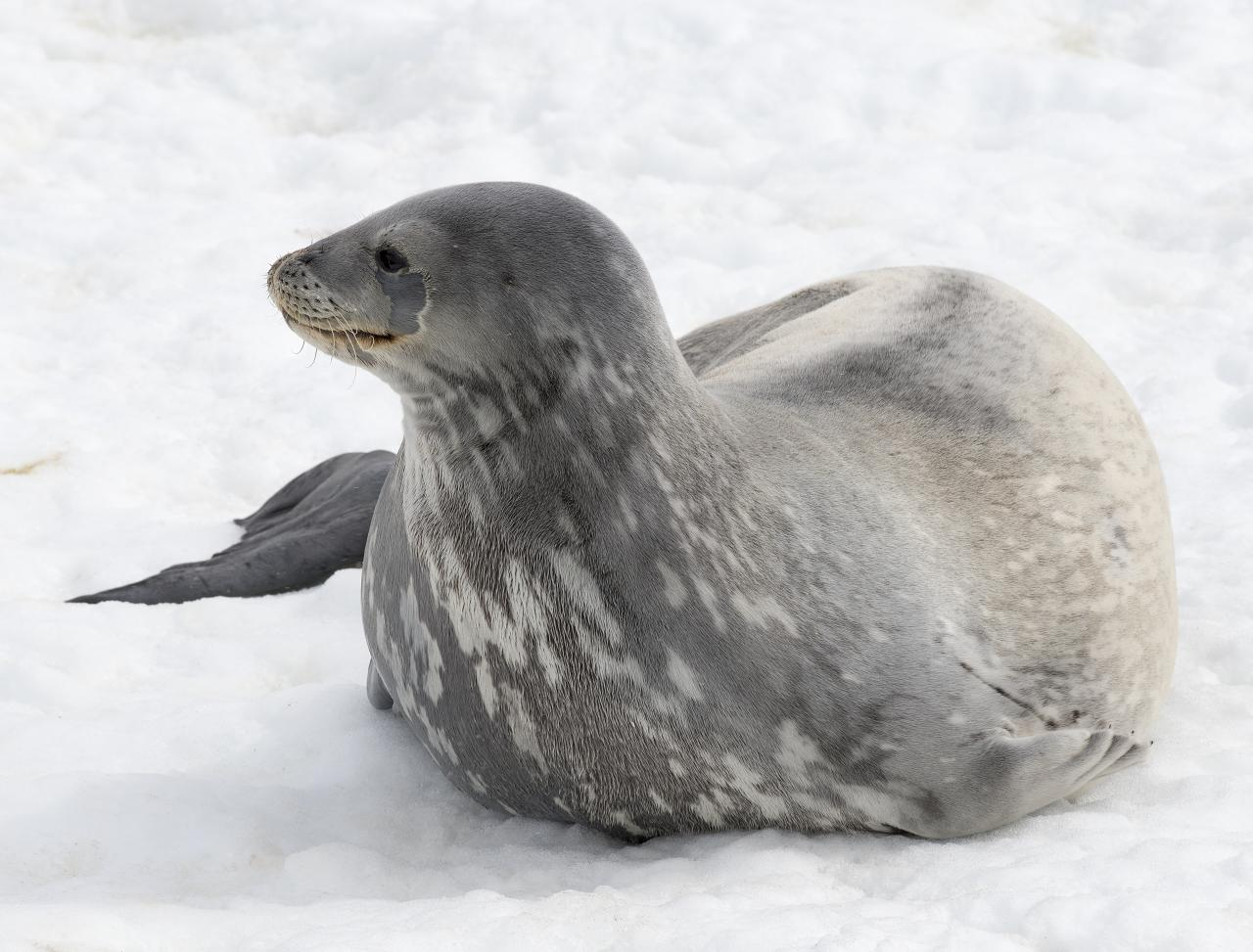
Weddell seal in Antarctica

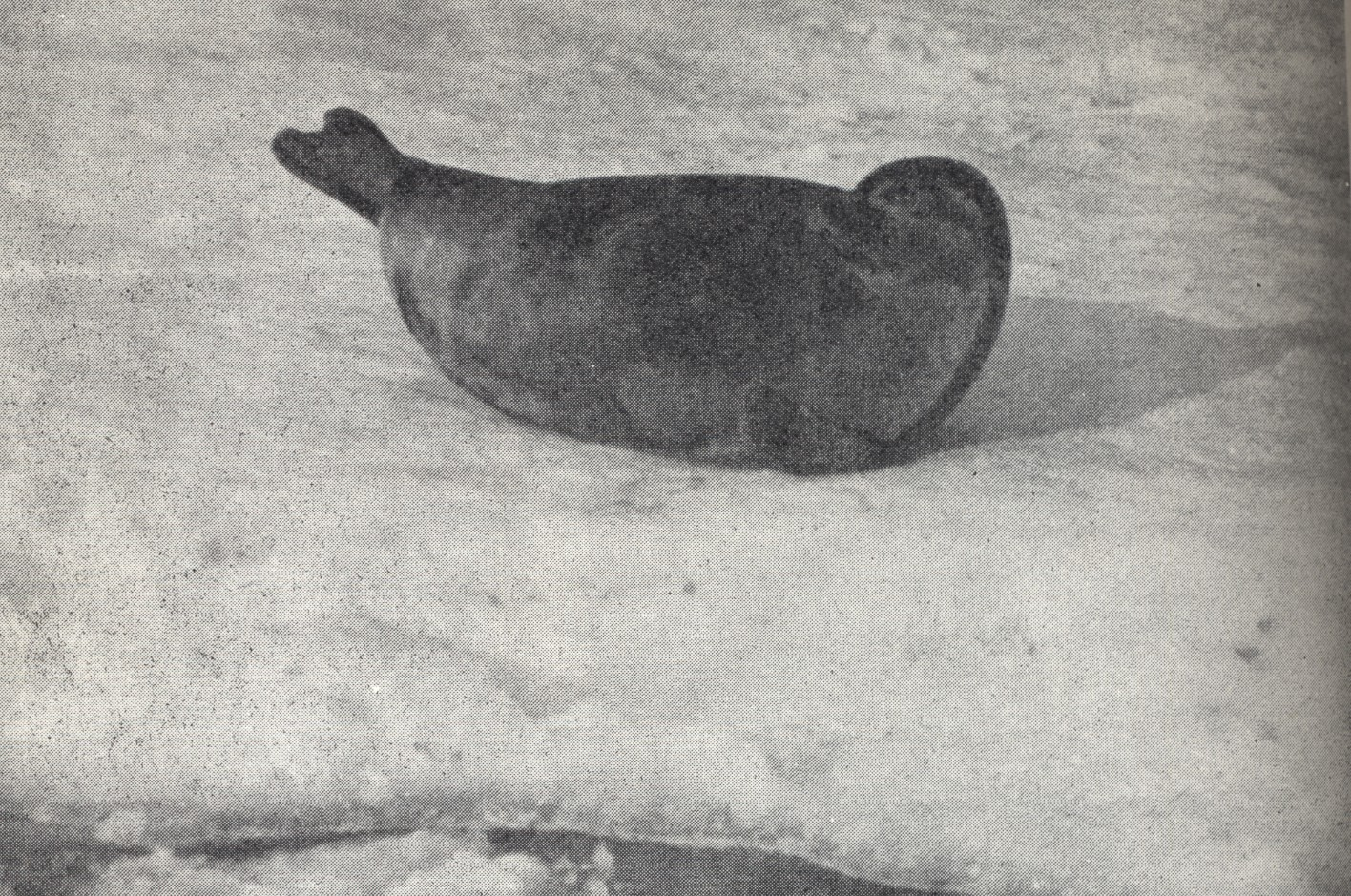
Living only in Lake Saimaa, Finland, Saimaa ringed seals, a subspecies of ringed seal, are among the most endangered seals in the world, having a total population of only about 400 individuals.

Phocids spend most of their time at sea, although they return to land or pack ice to breed and give birth. Pregnant females spend long periods foraging at sea, building up fat reserves, and then return to the breeding site to use their stored energy to nurse pups. However, the common seal displays a reproductive strategy similar to that used by otariids, in which the mother makes short foraging trips between nursing bouts.

Because a phocid mother's feeding grounds are often hundreds of kilometers from the breeding site, she must fast while lactating. This combination of fasting with lactation requires the mother to provide large amounts of energy to her pup at a time when she is not eating (and often, not drinking). Mothers must supply their own metabolic needs while nursing. This is a miniature version of the humpback whales' strategy, which involves fasting during their months-long migration from arctic feeding areas to tropical breeding/nursing areas and back.

Phocids produce thick, fat-rich milk that allows them to provide their pups with large amounts of energy in a short period. This allows the mother to return to the sea in time to replenish her reserves. Lactation ranges from five to seven weeks in the monk seal to just three to five days in the hooded seal. The mother ends nursing by leaving her pup at the breeding site to search for food (pups continue to nurse if given the opportunity). Phocids are known to deliberately nurse young that are not their own, this is particularly seen in individuals that have lost their own pup. "Milk stealers" that suckle from unrelated, sleeping females are not uncommon; this often results in the death of the mother's own pup through starvation; another side-effect of milk stealing in some species of phocid is the formation of "super weaners".

=== Growth and maturation ===
The pup's diet is so high in food energy that it builds up a fat store. Before the pup is ready to forage, the mother abandons it, and the pup consumes its own fat for weeks or even months while it matures. Seals, like all marine mammals, need time to develop the oxygen stores, swimming muscles, and neural pathways necessary for effective diving and foraging. Seal pups typically eat no food and drink no water during the period, although some polar species eat snow. The postweaning fast ranges from two weeks in the hooded seal to 9–12 weeks in the northern elephant seal. The physiological and behavioral adaptations that allow phocid pups to endure these remarkable fasts, which are among the longest for any mammal, remain an area of active study and research.

=== Feeding strategy ===
Phocids make use of at least four different feeding strategies: suction feeding, grip-and-tear feeding, filter feeding, and pierce feeding. Each of these feeding strategies is aided by a specialized skull, mandible, and tooth morphology. However, despite morphological specialization, most phocids are opportunistic and employ multiple strategies to capture and eat prey. For example, the leopard seal, Hydrurga leptonyx, uses grip-and-tear feeding to prey on penguins, suction feeding to consume small fish, and filter feeding to catch krill.

== See also ==
- Marine mammals as food
