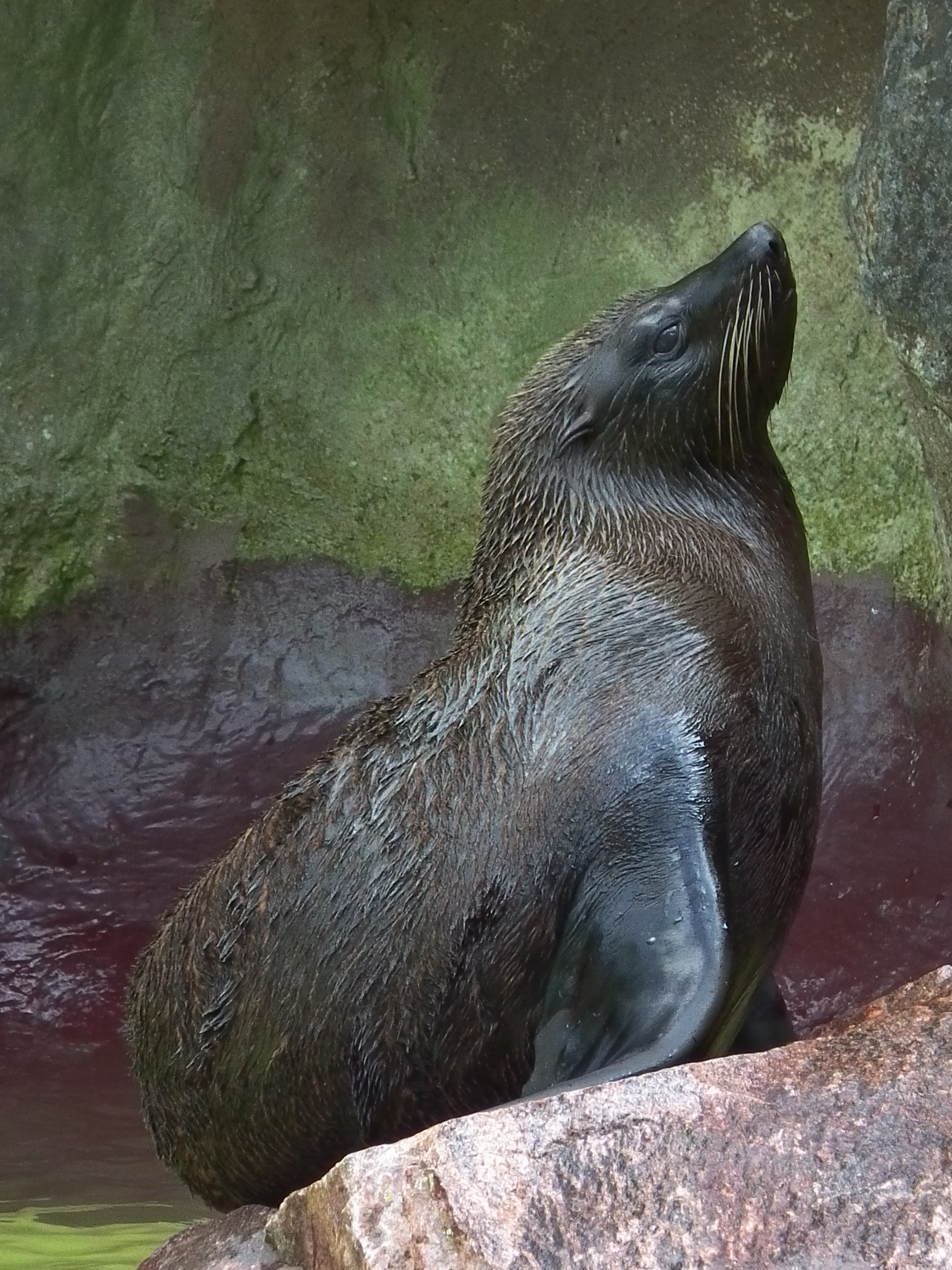
- South American fur seal at Zoo Landau

Conservation status
- Least Concern (IUCN 3.1)
- CITES Appendix II

Scientific classification
- Kingdom: Animalia
- Phylum: Chordata
- Class: Mammalia
- Order: Carnivora
- Parvorder: Pinnipedia
- Family: Otariidae
- Genus: Arctocephalus
- Species: A. australis

Binomial name
- Arctocephalus australis (Zimmermann, 1783)
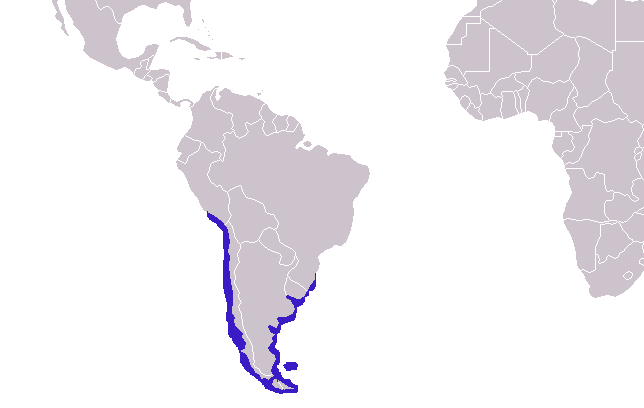
- Distribution of South American Fur Seal

= South American fur seal =

Species of mammal

The South American fur seal (Arctocephalus australis) breeds on the coasts of Peru, Chile, the Falkland Islands, Argentina, Uruguay and Brazil. South American fur seals are of least concern on the IUCN Red List. The total population is around 300,000-450,000. Populations are affected by hunting and environmental stressors.Arctocephalus australis have a dark grey or brown fur coat and are sexually dimorphic. Males compete for territory and females to mate with, forming a dominance hierarchy. Breeding season is from October to December, whereas multiple pups are bred each season. South American fur seals are nocturnal, carnivorous hunters that primarily eat demersal and pelagic fish. They are social and often hunt in groups. Communication within the species occurs through a variety of vocalizations, such as guttural threats, barks, whimpers, or submissive calls from the males and growls or high-pitched wails to gather pups from females. Four subspecies may be recognized: A. a. australis (Falkland Island fur seal), A. a. gracilis (South American fur seal), A. a. forsteri (New Zealand fur seal), and an unnamed species (Peruvian Fur Seal).

A description of the species and their distribution and habitat, conservation status, feeding behaviors, lifespan and mating practices, field identification, and additional behaviors is further discussed in this article.

== Description ==
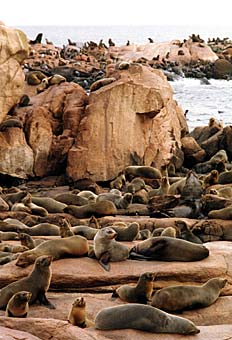
The Lobos Island National Park in Uruguay hosts one of the largest colonies of the South American fur seal.

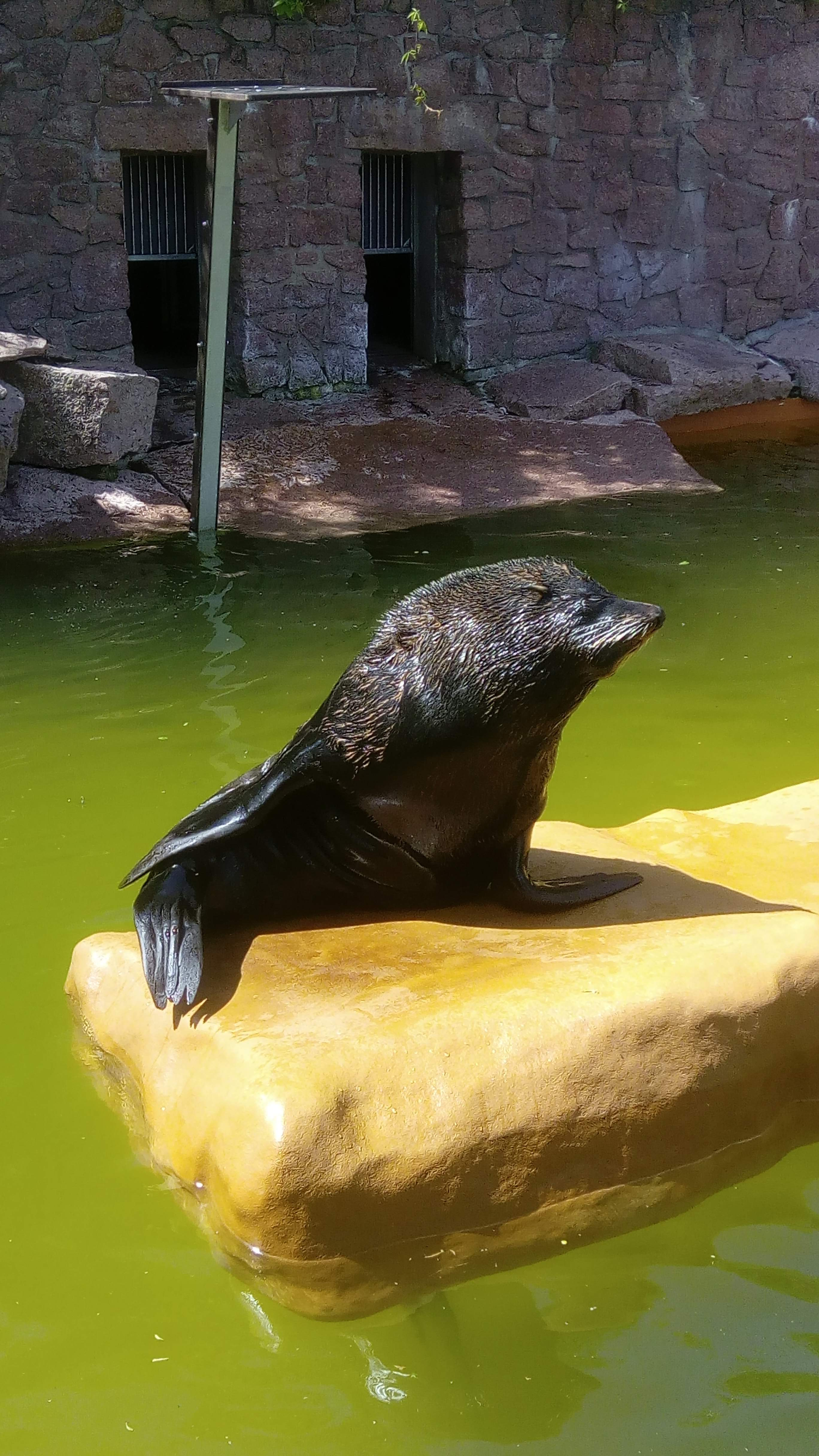
South American fur seal in captivity

The South American fur seal has a dark grey or brown coat of fur. The size of the seals varies based on region, but on average, adult males measure up to 2 m long and weigh 150–200 kg and females measure up to 1.5 m long and weigh 30–60 kg. Newborns are 60 to 65 cm and 3.5 to 5.5 kg. The species is sexually dimorphic. Coloring of adult females and subadults includes dark brown or grayish black on their dorsal side and shades of tan, grayish, or rusty brown on the underside. Coloring of adult males is more uniform and darker, typically dark brown with a gray or yellowish tan. Adult males also have thicker necks and shoulders than females, along with larger teeth and longer guard hairs forming a mane. The front flippers of both females and males are hairless and leathery with the first digit being the longest and the other 2-5 digits being shorter. The hind flippers are also hairless and leathery but each digit is closer in length and long. Both males and females are stocky and robust with large eyes, a moderately long muzzle, and a rounded crown.

South American fur seals are often confused with South American sea lions, as well as Juan Fernandez fur seals, Antarctic fur seals, Subantarctic fur seals, Galapagos fur seals, and Galapagos sea lions due to a similar appearance.

== Distribution and habitat ==
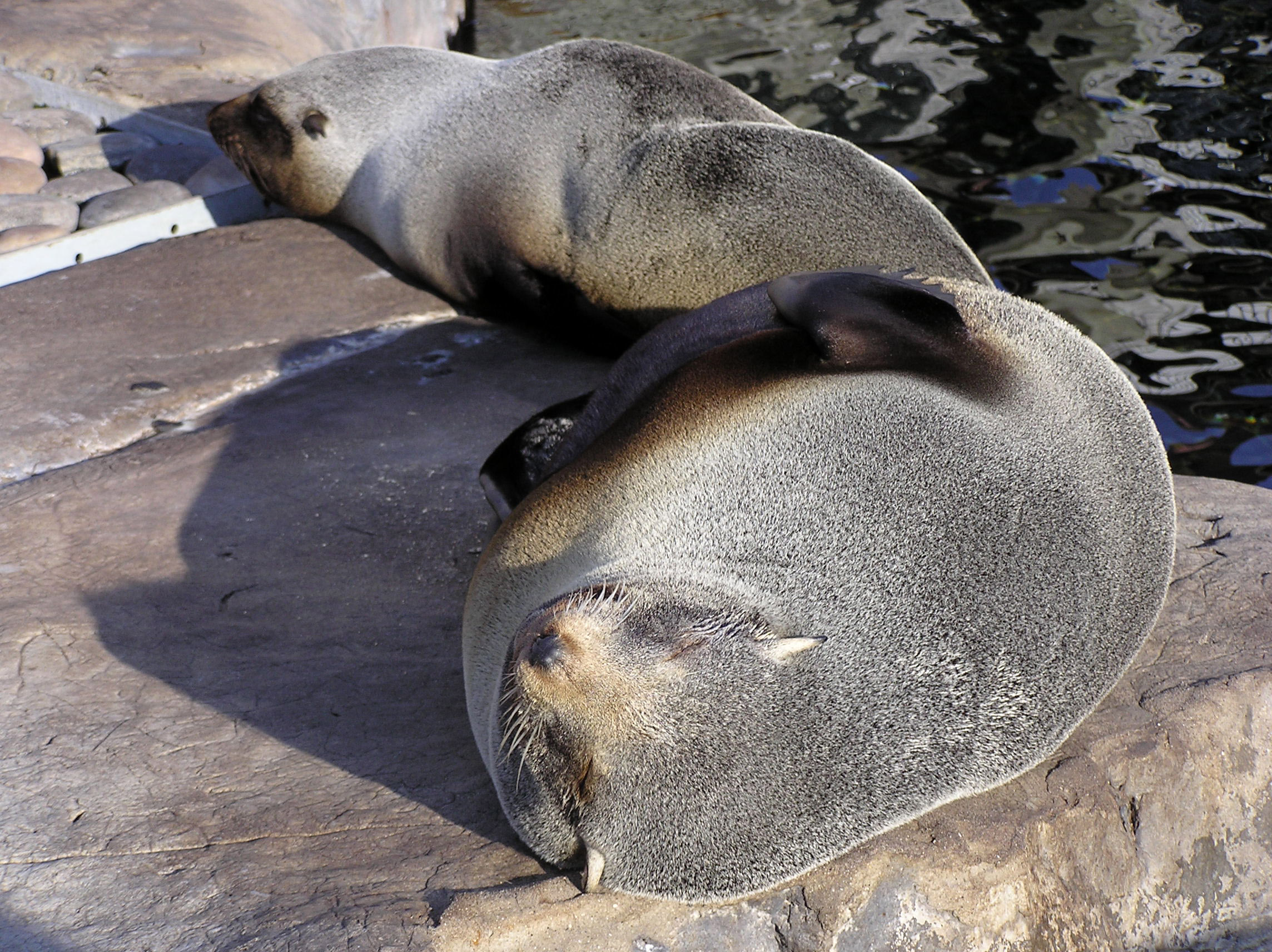
Two South American fur seals sleeping on a huge rock

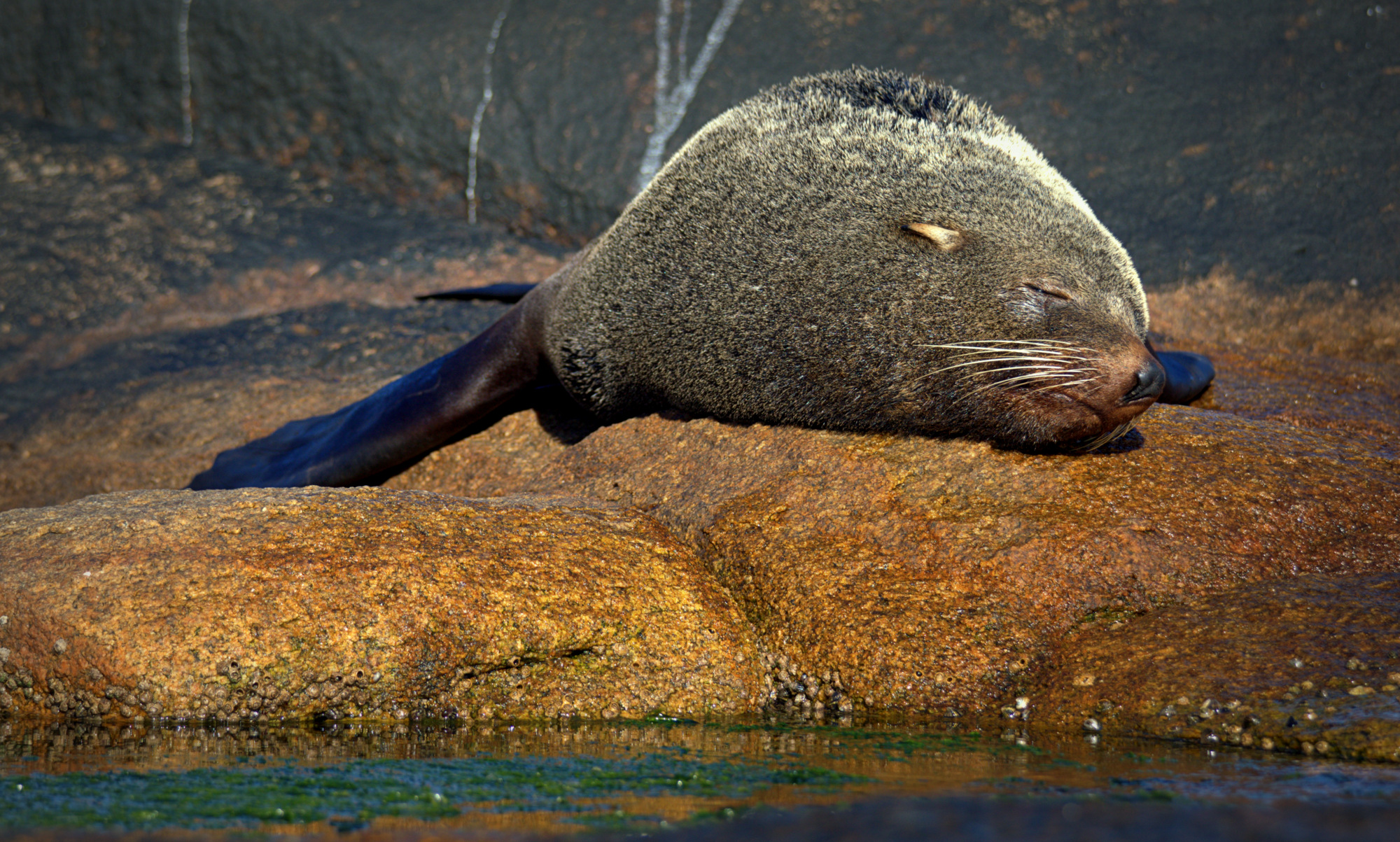
South American fur seal in Cabo Polonio, Rocha Department, Uruguay

The South American fur seal is found on neotropical ocean coasts from the Paracas Peninsula of southern Peru, around Cape Horn on the Pacific coast, and northward to southern Brazil on the Atlantic coast. They are also found on the Falkland Islands, Staten Island, and Escondida Island. Arctocephalus australis seals prefer rocky shores and islands, particularly those with steep slopes. They have been found in sea caves in Peru, where some climb up to 15 m to find a spot to rest. There have been isolated records from continental Ecuador, the Galápagos Islands, and the Gorgona Island (Colombia). Recent tracking studies reveal that South American fur seals breeding at the Falkland Islands use a vast area of the Patagonian Shelf.

The total population is around 300,000-450,000. Although Uruguay has long been considered to be the largest population of South American fur seals, recent census data indicates that the largest breeding population of the subspecies A. a. australis (that breeds in Chile, the Falkland Islands, Argentina, Uruguay) are at the Falkland Islands (estimated pup abundance ~36,000) followed by Uruguay (pup abundance ~31,000). The population of South American fur seals in 1999 was estimated at 390,000, a drop from a 1987 estimate of 500,000 - however a paucity of population data, combined with inconsistent census methods, makes it difficult to interpret global population trends.

== Conservation ==
South American Fur Seals are of least concern on the IUCN Red List. Despite this, the species has been targeted by hunters for their fur, oil, and leather for thousands of years. Commercial hunting of the species is currently banned in Uruguay. However, fishermen in Uruguay blame the seals for jeopardizing their catch by wrecking nets and eating the fish so they called for a seal cull. An initiative for tourists in 1996 was launched to raise some money to counteract the need for a cull, however it was not as successful as hoped. Conversely, South American fur seals are protected in Peru and have been since 1959, however poaching is still performed on the species. Environmental stressors also put the species at risk, such as oil tank spillage. In 1997, 6,000 seals were killed from an oil tank that spilled ~4,500 cubic meters of oil off the Uruguay coast. Previous El Niño events have driven seals to migrate from Peru to northern Chile, decreased the birth rate of pups, and killed ~80% of the adult female and pup seals in Peru, of which they are still recovering from. Commercial fishing can also put the species at risk via entanglement in gillnets and a lack of available fish for food. The exact effect of fisheries on the species' conservation status is not known.

== Lifespan and mating ==
Female South American fur seals reach sexual maturity and begin breeding at age 3 while males reach sexual maturity at 7 years and begin breeding at 8 years due to competition. The breeding season is from October to December. They are polygynous, meaning males have more than one breeding partner during a single breeding season. This makes males competitive for territory and females with the most dominant male seals gaining a higher ratio of both, forming a dominance hierarchy. In Uruguay, individual male seals can typically have up to 13 females on their territories, of which they can occupy for up to 60 days.

Multiple pups are bred each breeding season and pups wean between 6-12 months, sometimes taking up to 3 years, in which females would nurse two pups at once. Breeding begins again just 5-10 days after giving birth with embryonic diapause lasting 3-4 months and gestation lasting 8-12 months. Females undertake a feeding cycle while nursing where they search for food for 3-5 days and return to land to nurse for 1-2 days, this lasts a total of 6-12 months. The rate of mortality among pups increases as the density of the colony increases, because the mother and the pup can become separated leaving the pup vulnerable to injury from aggressive adults. A mortality rate as high as 31-49% has previously been recorded in Peru. Overall, the lifespan of fur seals tend to be between 12-30 years.

== Feeding behavior (ecology) ==
South American fur seals are nocturnal carnivorous hunters that primarily eat a variety of demersal and pelagic fish depending on location. South American fur seals typically eat anchovies, weakfish, cutlassfish, anchoveta, cephalopods, lamellibranchs, and gastropods. Additionally, those of Uruguay and Peru also feed on anchovies, those of Brazil feed on shrimp, those of Chile feed on lobster krill, and those of the Falkland Islands feed on squid primarily.

The South American fur seals are prey to sharks and orcas, although pups are also preyed on by male South American sea lions in Peru and Uruguay.

== Additional behaviors ==
Communication among the South American fur seals include vocalizations, such as guttural threats, barks, whimpers, or submissive calls from the males and growls or high-pitched wails to gather pups from females. Studies have even shown that the pup call from a mother is unique and only distinguishable between each other. This mother and pup communication is important so that the mother can find the pup after returning from hunting for a couple of days to continue lactation and for the safety of the pup, as it risks being trampled by other adult seals.

South American fur seals are social and often fish in groups, spending most of their time swimming. However, during breeding season they reside mainly on land. Territory is fought for by males as they aim for the largest rocky and shady area for breeding with multiple females.

== Subspecies ==
Four subspecies may be recognized:

- A. a. australis - Falkland Islands
- A. a. gracilis - South America
- A. a. forsteri - New Zealand
- Unnamed - Peru

== See also ==
- Arctocephalus

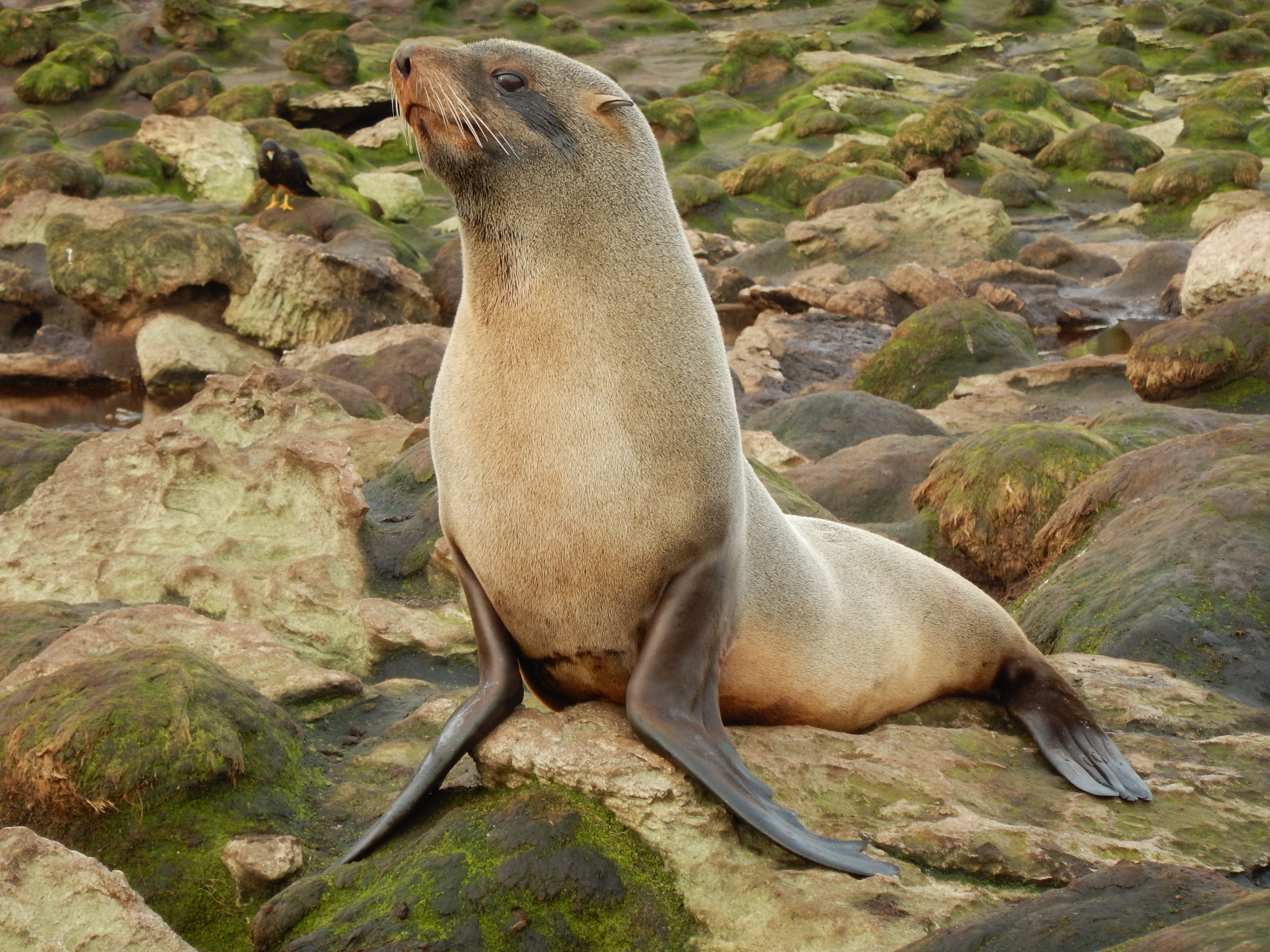
South American fur seal adult female
