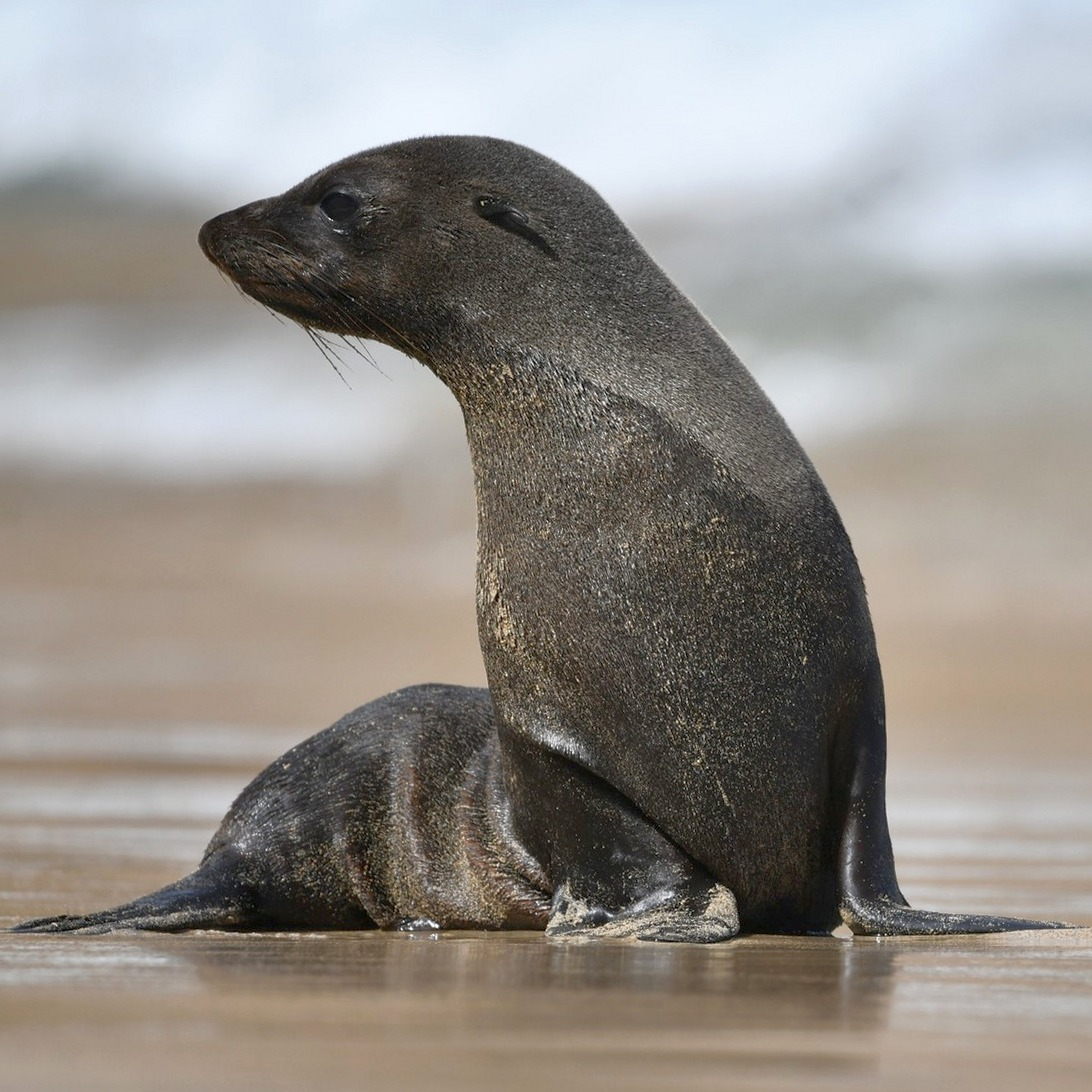

Conservation status
- Least Concern (IUCN 3.1)
- CITES Appendix II

Scientific classification
- Kingdom: Animalia
- Phylum: Chordata
- Class: Mammalia
- Order: Carnivora
- Parvorder: Pinnipedia
- Family: Otariidae
- Genus: Arctocephalus
- Species: A. philippii

Binomial name
- Arctocephalus philippii Peters, 1866
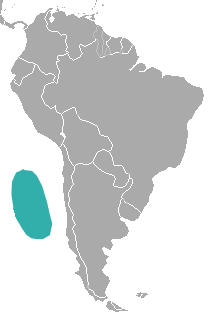
- Juan Fernández fur seal range

= Juan Fernández fur seal =

Juan Fernández Fur Seal

Species of carnivore

The Juan Fernández fur seal (Arctocephalus philippii) is the second smallest of the fur seals, after the Galápagos fur seal. They are found only on the Pacific Coast of South America, more specifically on the Juan Fernández Islands and the Desventuradas Islands. Much is still unknown about this species. Scientists do not yet know the average lifespan of this species, or the diet and behavior of males outside the breeding season.

== Description ==
The Juan Fernandez fur seal is part of the group of eared seals. Fur seals in general have thick insulating fur that protects the skin from cold water, they have small ear flaps on the side of their head, and they hold their weight on their front flippers which are also used for land locomotion. Fur seals are different from true seals because they have external ear flaps, but also true seals use their chest for support and movement, and fur seals walk on their front flippers.

The Juan Fernandez fur seal is the second smallest fur seal, second only to the Galápagos fur seal. Their bodies are short and robust with brown pelage. Both the fore flippers and the hind flippers are relatively short, and the hind flippers have fleshy tips on the digits. Females are lighter brown and average 100 pounds (45 kg) and 4 feet 6 inches (1.37 m) long. Males are significantly larger and average 300 pounds (140 kg) and 6 feet 6 inches (1.98 m) in length. Males have thicker necks than females and have generally darker brown pelage. Male seals have golden-tipped thick guard hairs on the back of the head, neck, and shoulders. This seal species has a trait called sexual dimorphism, meaning the males look much different from the females after reaching sexual maturity.

== History ==
The Juan Fernández fur seal was discovered, and named, by Juan Fernández in the mid-1500s. Once the seal was discovered the population was decimated by over hunting for the fur trade. It was believed that the Juan Fernández fur seal was extinct until a small group of 200 was found on the Juan Fernández islands in the 1960s. Now it is estimated that over 12,000 individuals exist today.

In 1864 the naturalist Rodolfo Philippi, working at the Chilean National Museum of Natural History sent the fur and skeleton of a specimen to Wilhelm Peters in Berlin's Museum für Naturkunde for taxonomic classification. Classification in Chile was not possible at the time as specimens for comparison and relevant literature on the topic were not available in the country. Also, early naturalists in Chile had also to deal with a wide range of topics while those in Europe were more specialized.

The resulting classification by Peters became the subject of a long-running scientific controversy. Hermann Burmeister compared drawings and the written description of the species with specimens at the La Plata Museum and concluded in 1866 that it was not a new species but a Phoca porcina that was described by the Jesuit Juan Ignacio Molina many years ago. In the early 1870s John Edward Gray, who had recently arrived specimens of similar species from Australia and New Zealand to his disposal, questioned whether Juan Fernández fur seal was a species by its own. In 1879 he wrote again on the subject claiming that O. philippi was indeed the same as Otaria ursina described by Claudio Gay. In 1888 and 1889 Phillipi published articles where he harshly criticized both Burmeisters alternative classification and his alleged errors, suggesting a poor knowledge of geography and of the sources he cited.

== Behavior ==
This particular seal lives a solitary life. Seals forage out at sea and haul out on rocky shores to rest. Females seem to be fairly particular about where she rests during the day and prefer tide pools and rocky caves. The resting areas that females prefer often become areas of male competition for breeding rights. Although females will typically rest in close regions, they are sure to be a few feet away from each other and never touch one another.

== Reproduction ==
Breeding is a territorial process with the Juan Fernández fur seal, males will aggressively fight for access to female resting sites. This seal is polygynous, meaning that one male breeds with multiple females. Pups are born between November and December and are weaned off the mother's milk at 10 months of age. Mothers stay with the pups for about a week and then they leave to mate again and forage. Pups are born with soft black fur that fades to light brown within the first few years.

== Diet ==
Not much is known about the diet of Juan Fernández fur seals. Scientists have only observed the diet of lactating females that are caring for pups. What they have observed is that females forage out at sea sometimes as far as 300 miles offshore and will dive to depths of 30 to 300 feet (9.1 to 91.4 m) to find lanternfish and squid. Typically lactating females will dive and forage at night when prey swims to shallow waters and become more accessible. Sometimes they will stay out at sea for up to 25 days, then return to shore and stay with the pups for 5 days.

During the period that the mothers are foraging, the pup goes without milk for several days, sometimes weeks. To combat this, the mother's milk is high in fat and nutrients that the pup uses for energy while the mother is away. However, during this time, the pups' immune systems are not as highly-functioning as adults and can be prone to infection from intestinal parasites that lead to fatal infections. In the early 1990s, there were 60 pups discovered dead from hookworm infections, and also the presence of heavy metal ions were found in their systems. Such loss decimated the population and they are still recovering now.
