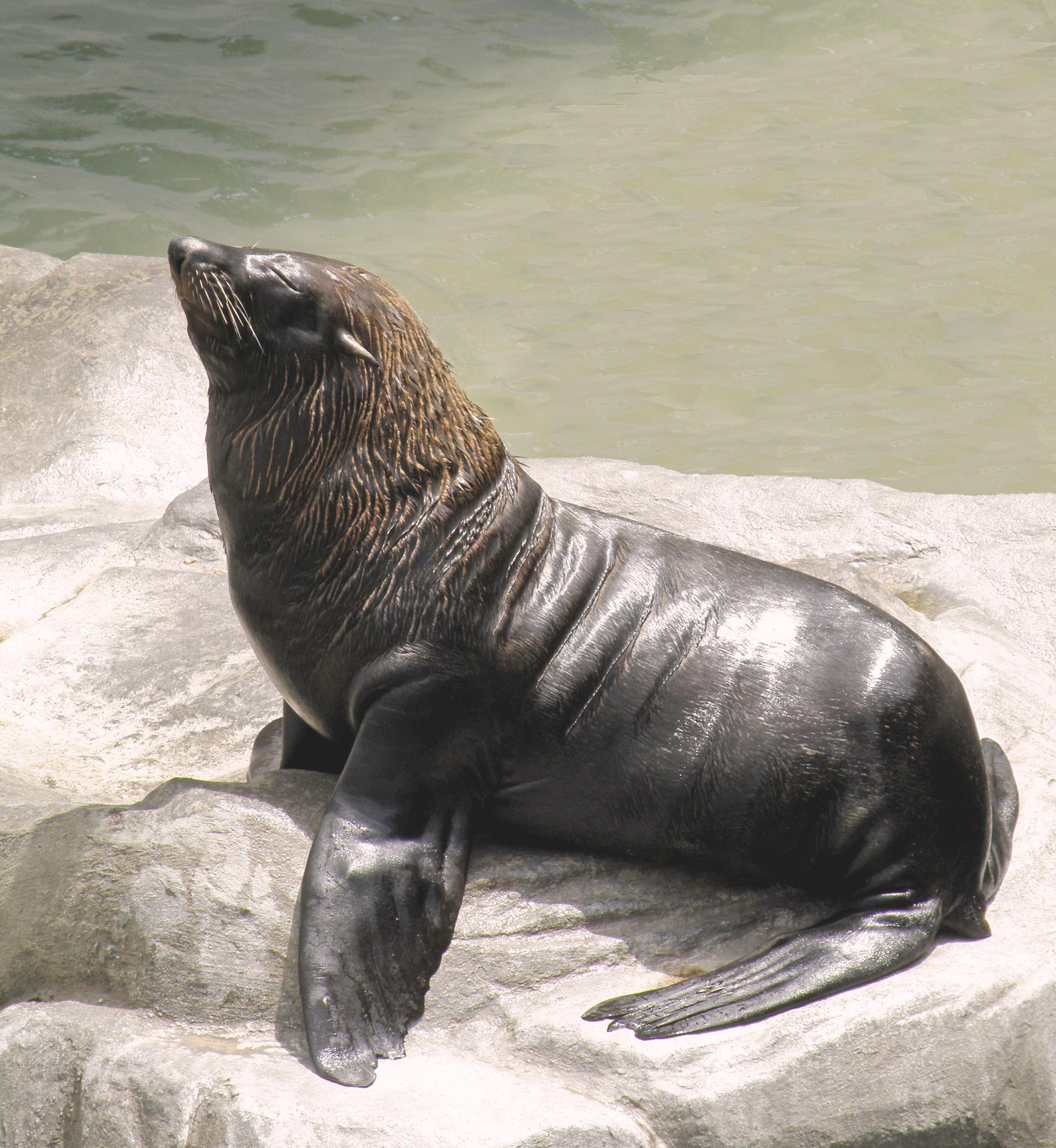
- South American fur seal

Scientific classification
- Kingdom: Animalia
- Phylum: Chordata
- Class: Mammalia
- Order: Carnivora
- Parvorder: Pinnipedia
- Family: Otariidae
- Genus: Arctocephalus; É. Geoffroy Saint-Hilaire & F. Cuvier in F. Cuvier, 1826

Type species
- Phoca pusilla Schreber, 1775

Species
- Arctocephalus gazella Arctocephalus townsendi Arctocephalus philippii Arctocephalus galapagoensis Arctocephalus pusillus Arctocephalus forsteri Arctocephalus tropicalis Arctocephalus australis
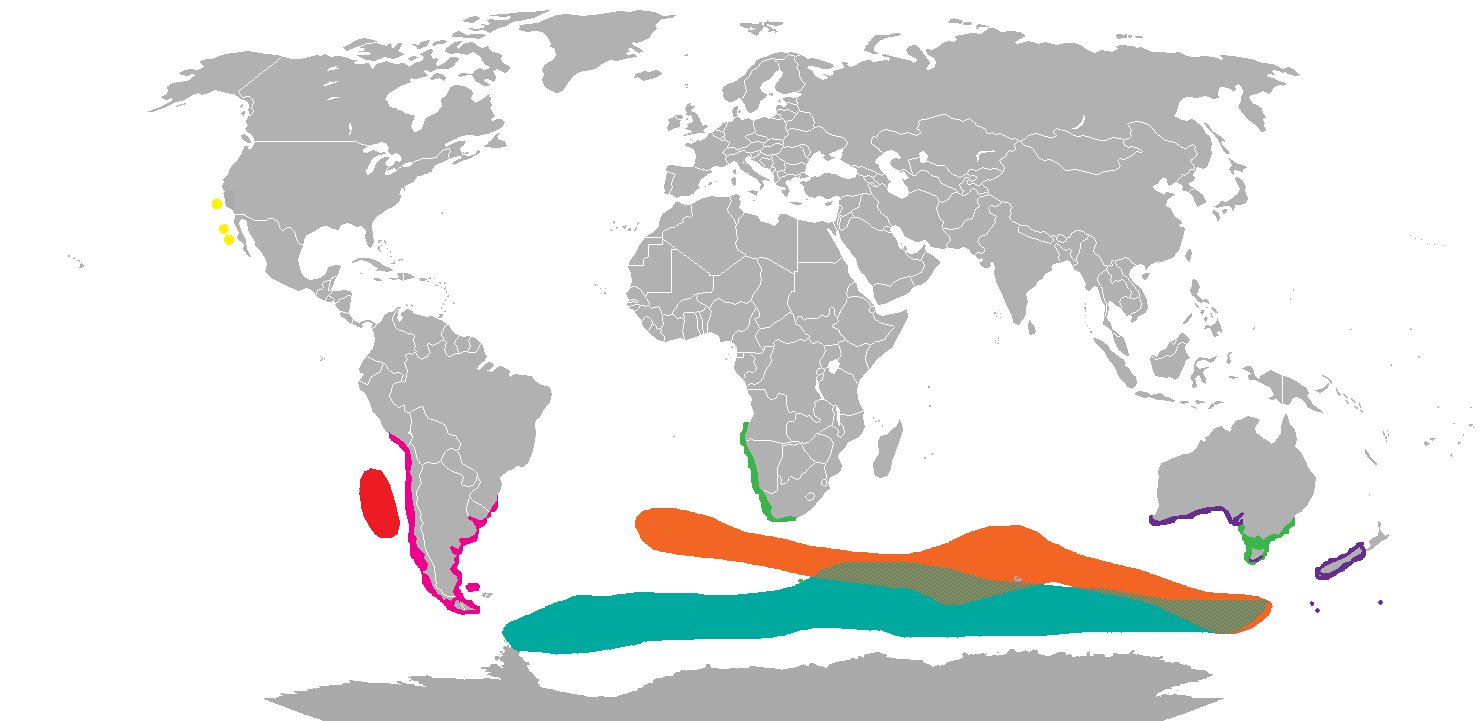
A. townsendi
A. galapagoensis
A. philippii
A. australis
A. gazella
A. tropicalis
A. pusillus
A. forsteri

Synonyms
- Arctophoca; Cynophoca

= Arctocephalus =

Genus of carnivores

The genus Arctocephalus consists of the southern fur seals. Arctocephalus translates to "bear head".

== Taxonomy ==
The number of species within the genus has been questioned, primarily based on limited molecular data. The issue is complicated because some of the species are able to produce fertile hybrids. A recent review recommended the retention of seven species, deprecating the New Zealand fur seals to a subspecies of the South American fur seal, while also questioning the status of the Guadalupe fur seal. Other recent studies have indicated the genus may be paraphyletic, and some taxonomic reshuffling was previously done to account for this; however, more recent studies support it being monophyletic, with the alleged paraphyly being a consequence of incomplete lineage sorting.

=== Extant species ===
Cladogram

- Arctocephalus
  - - Brown fur seal
    - Subantarctic fur seal
  - - - Guadalupe fur seal
      - Juan Fernández fur seal
    - - Antarctic fur seal
      - - New Zealand fur seal
        - - Galápagos fur seal
          - South American fur seal

Genus Arctocephalus – É. Geoffroy Saint-Hilaire & F. Cuvier, 1826 – eight species
Common name	Scientific name and subspecies	Range	Size and ecology	IUCN status and estimated population
Antarctic fur seal	Arctocephalus gazella (Peters, 1875)	Subantarctic islands	Size: Male: 180 cm (71 in) long; 130–200 kg (287–441 lb); Female: 120–140 cm (47–55 in) long; 22–50 kg (49–110 lb) Habitat: Neritic marine, oceanic marine, intertidal marine, and coastal marine Diet: Krill, cephalopods, fish, and penguins	LC 700,000–1,000,000
Guadalupe fur seal	Arctocephalus townsendi (Merriam, 1897)	Map of range	Size: Habitat: Diet:	LC
Juan Fernández fur seal	Arctocephalus philippii (Peters, 1866)	Map of range	Size: Habitat: Diet:	LC
Galápagos fur seal	Arctocephalus galapagoensis (Heller, 1904)	Galápagos Islands	Size: Male: 150–160 cm (59–63 in) long; 60–68 kg (132–150 lb); Female: 110–130 cm (43–51 in) long; 27–33 kg (60–73 lb) Habitat: Neritic marine, oceanic marine, intertidal marine, and coastal marine Diet: Small squids and a variety of fish	EN 10,000
Brown fur seal or Cape fur seal	Arctocephalus pusillus (Schreber, 1775) Two subspecies: A. p. pusillus (Cape/South African fur seal); A. p. doriferus (Australian fur seal)	Southern African and Australian coasts (dark blue indicates breeding grounds)	Size: Male: 201–227 cm (79–89 in) long; 218–360 kg (481–794 lb); Female: 136–171 cm (54–67 in) long; 41–113 kg (90–249 lb) Habitat: Neritic marine, oceanic marine, intertidal marine, and coastal marine Diet: A wide variety of fish, cephalopods, and crustaceans, and sometimes African penguins and other seabirds	LC 1,060,000
New Zealand fur seal	Arctocephalus forsteri (Lesson, 1828)	Map of range	Size: Habitat: Diet:	LC
Subantarctic fur seal	Arctocephalus tropicalis (Gray, 1872)	Map of range	Size: Habitat: Diet:	LC
South American fur seal	Arctocephalus australis (Zimmermann, 1783)	Map of range	Size: Habitat: Diet:	LC
