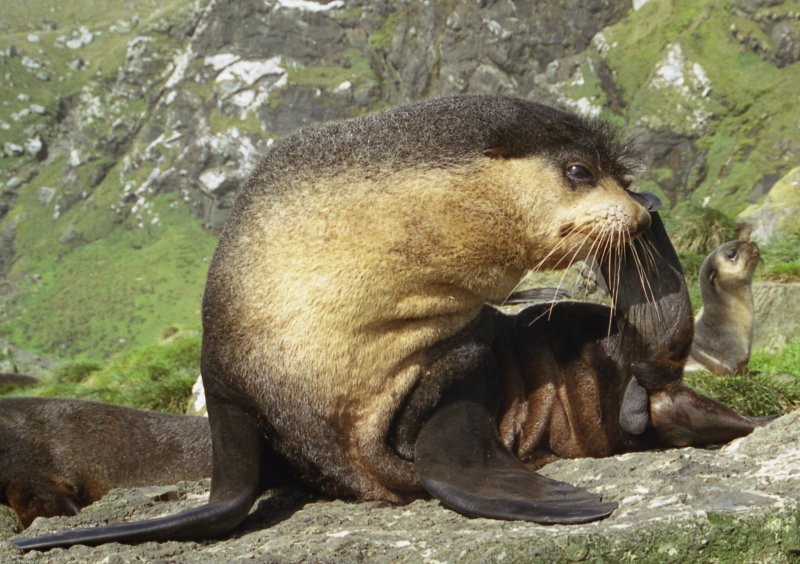
- Male
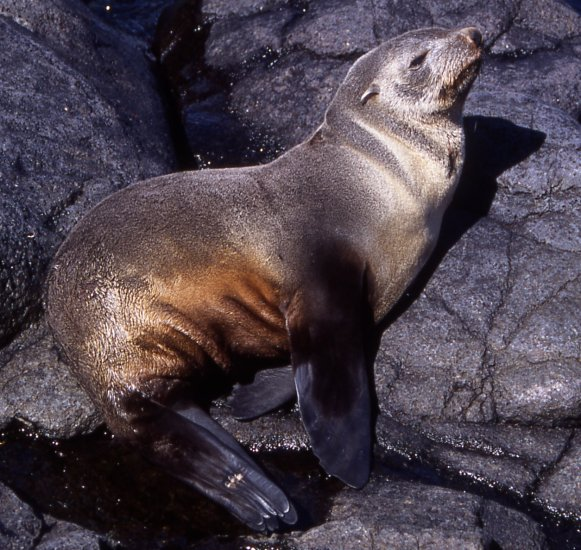
- Female

Conservation status
- Least Concern (IUCN 3.1)
- CITES Appendix II

Scientific classification
- Kingdom: Animalia
- Phylum: Chordata
- Class: Mammalia
- Order: Carnivora
- Parvorder: Pinnipedia
- Family: Otariidae
- Genus: Arctocephalus
- Species: A. tropicalis

Binomial name
- Arctocephalus tropicalis Gray, 1872
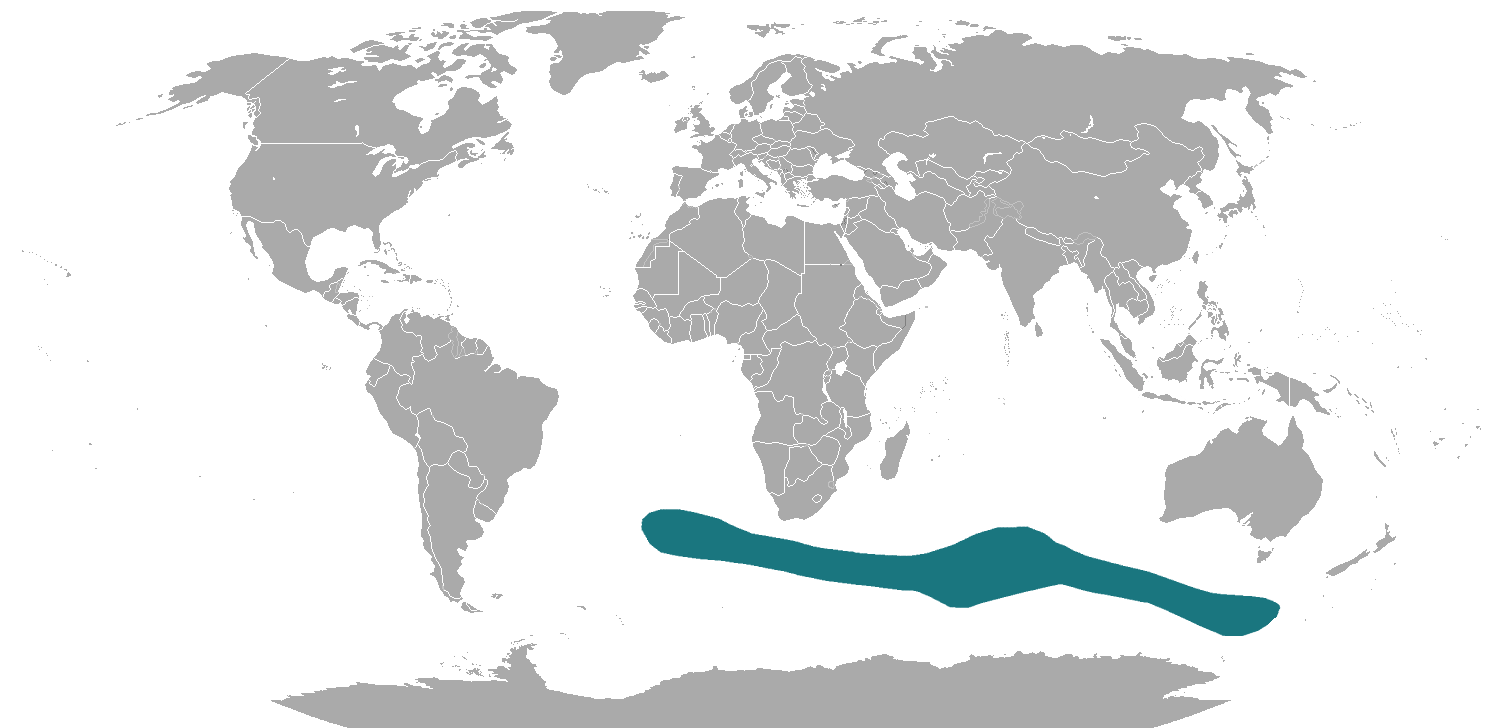
- Subantarctic fur seal range

Synonyms
- Arctocephalus elegans Peters, 1876

= Subantarctic fur seal =

Species of carnivore

The subantarctic fur seal (Arctocephalus tropicalis) is a species of eared seal found in the southern parts of the Indian, Pacific, and Atlantic Oceans. It was first described by Gray in 1872 from a specimen recovered in northern Australia—hence the inappropriate specific name tropicalis.

== Description ==
The subantarctic fur seal is medium in size compared with other fur seals. The two sexes are strongly sexually dimorphic: males grow to 2 m (6 ft 7 in) and 160 kg (350 lb), whereas females are substantially smaller—1.4 m (4 ft 7 in) and 50 kg (110 lb). Subantarctic fur seals have creamy-orange chests and faces. Their bellies are more brownish. Males have a dark grey to black back; females are a lighter grey. Males have a characteristic dark tuft of hair on the top of their head that stands erect when they are excited. Pups are black at birth, but molt at about 3 months old. The snout is short and flat, and the flippers are short and broad. Subantarctic fur seals live for about 20–25 years.

== Distribution ==
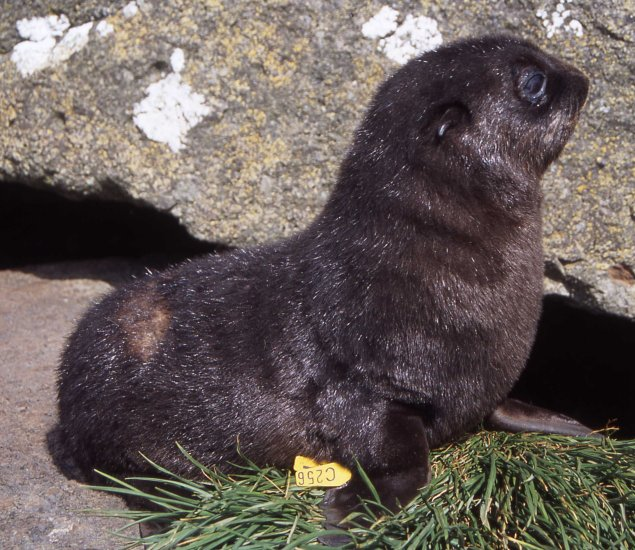
Pup in the Crozet Islands

Arctocephalus tropicalis, the subantarctic fur seal, is geographically widespread; as their specific and common names imply, they generally breed in and inhabit more northerly (subantarctic, or "tropical") places than the Antarctic fur seal (Arctocephalus gazella) does. The largest known breeding colonies are on Gough Island, in the South Atlantic, and Île Amsterdam, in the southern reaches of the Indian Ocean. Breeding grounds are also located on Marion Island in the Prince Edward Islands—which is shared with the Antarctic fur seal—as well as the Crozet Islands and Macquarie Island. In places where the two species intermingle, A. tropicalis can be identified visually by the lighter, orange colouring on its chest. Occasional hybridisation has been known to occur between the two seals in these areas.

About 300,000 subantarctic fur seals are alive today, likely substantially fewer than when they were first discovered in 1810, as they were hunted excessively for their pelts throughout the 19th century. Populations from ancient history, prior to human contact, were likely even higher. However, the species recovers rapidly, it seems, albeit in areas where it is protected by the Convention for the Conservation of Antarctic Seals (CCAS). A small population on Heard Island is considered endangered. The Antarctic fur seal was also vigorously hunted, to the point of all but one breeding colony remaining by the year 1900, resulting in a low species-wide genetic variability; meanwhile, the genetic diversity among subantarctic fur seals has remained high. There appear to be three distinct genetic lineages in the subantarctic species, though none of them represent any particular geographical area.

== Behavior ==
=== Breeding ===
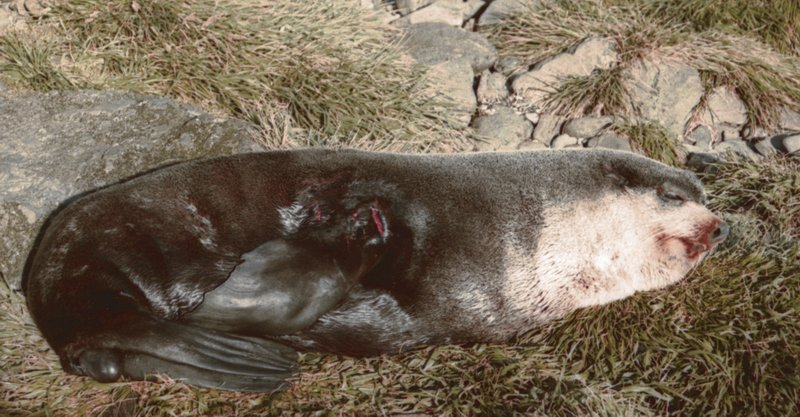
Male subantarctic fur seal with injuries from a recent fight with another male

As with other otariids, subantarctic fur seals gather in large rookeries on the shore to breed. They have a polygynous mating system in which dominant males defend their harem of 6–20 females. Fights between males for mating rights are violent and can result in severe injuries. Males will also compete against each other through vocalizations and threat displays. The breeding season takes place from November to January. Gestation lasts around 51 weeks, at the end of which the female will give birth to a single pup. 8–12 days after giving birth, they will breed again. Males are capable of mating at around 3–4 years of age, but they are unlikely to hold a harem until they are 10–11 years old. Females reach sexual maturity at around 5 years.

=== Life cycle ===
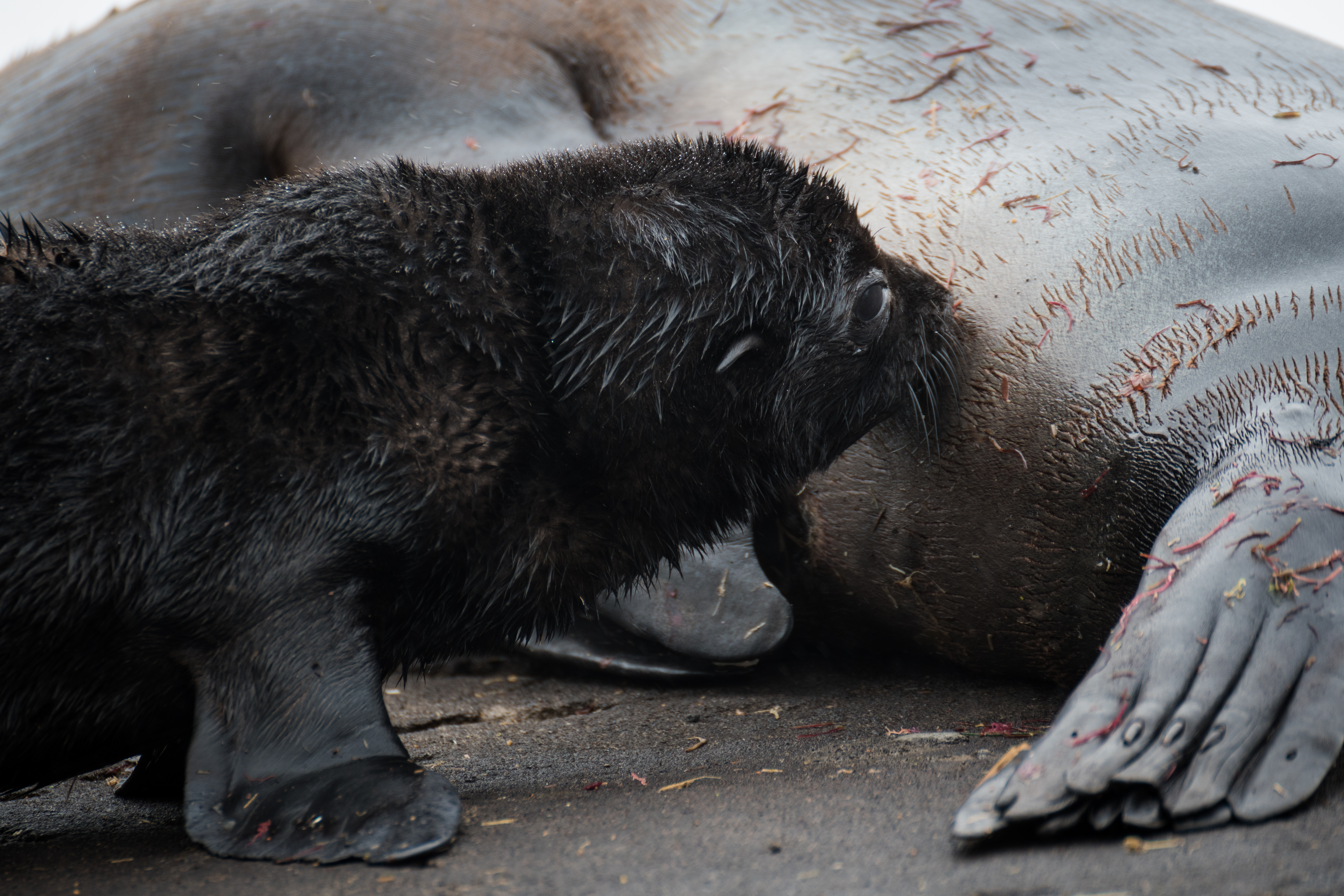
Suckling

After being born, pups spend around 11 months feeding on their mother's milk, which is about 39% fat. The length of their lactation is typical of otariid seals, and contrasts with the far shorter 4 month lactation of the Antarctic fur seal. They stay at the rookery during this period. Weaning occurs shortly before the next offspring is born. They molt their black coat at around 3 months of age. As adults, they continue to molt their coat annually between March and May.

=== Diet and foraging ===
Subantarctic fur seals hunt in shallow waters at night, when myctophid fish come close to the surface. They also feed on squid. Other prey can include crustaceans, and occasionally rockhopper penguins and other seabirds.

A study conducted on subantarctic fur seals at Marion Island from 1996 to 2000 concluded that myctophid fish constituted the largest part of the seals' diet, with fish from the families Channichthyidae, Paralepididae, Nototheniidae, Microstomatidae and Notosudidae being eaten in smaller numbers. The size of prey fish ranged from small myctophids with an average length of 25 mm, to large Patagonian toothfish with an average length of 70 cm (28 in).

=== Travelling ===
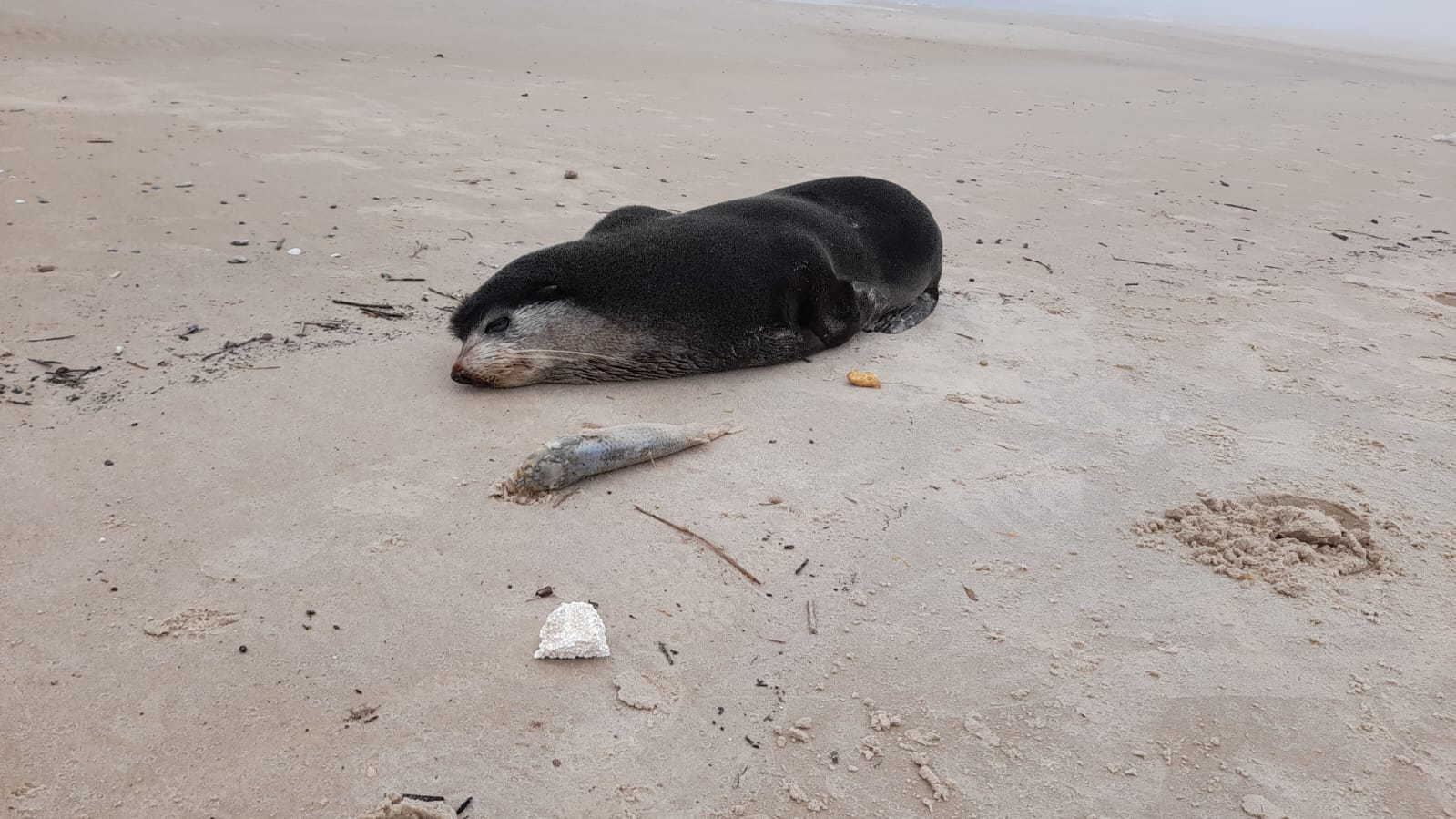
A male resting on a beach in playa de El Fortin, Uruguay, having swum far from its native area

Subantarctic fur seals are unique in their tendency to occasionally travel very long distances from their home islands. Young males have been seen travelling thousands of miles from their native habitat, being sighted in countries such as Brazil, Angola, Australia and New Zealand. In July 2015, a young male seal was caught and later released by local fishermen off the coast of Kenya, more than 4,000 miles (6,400 km) from its home. This is the furthest north that a subantarctic fur seal has been recorded travelling to. Lactating females have been recorded travelling up to 530 km (330 mi) from their colonies in order to forage for food.

== Gallery ==
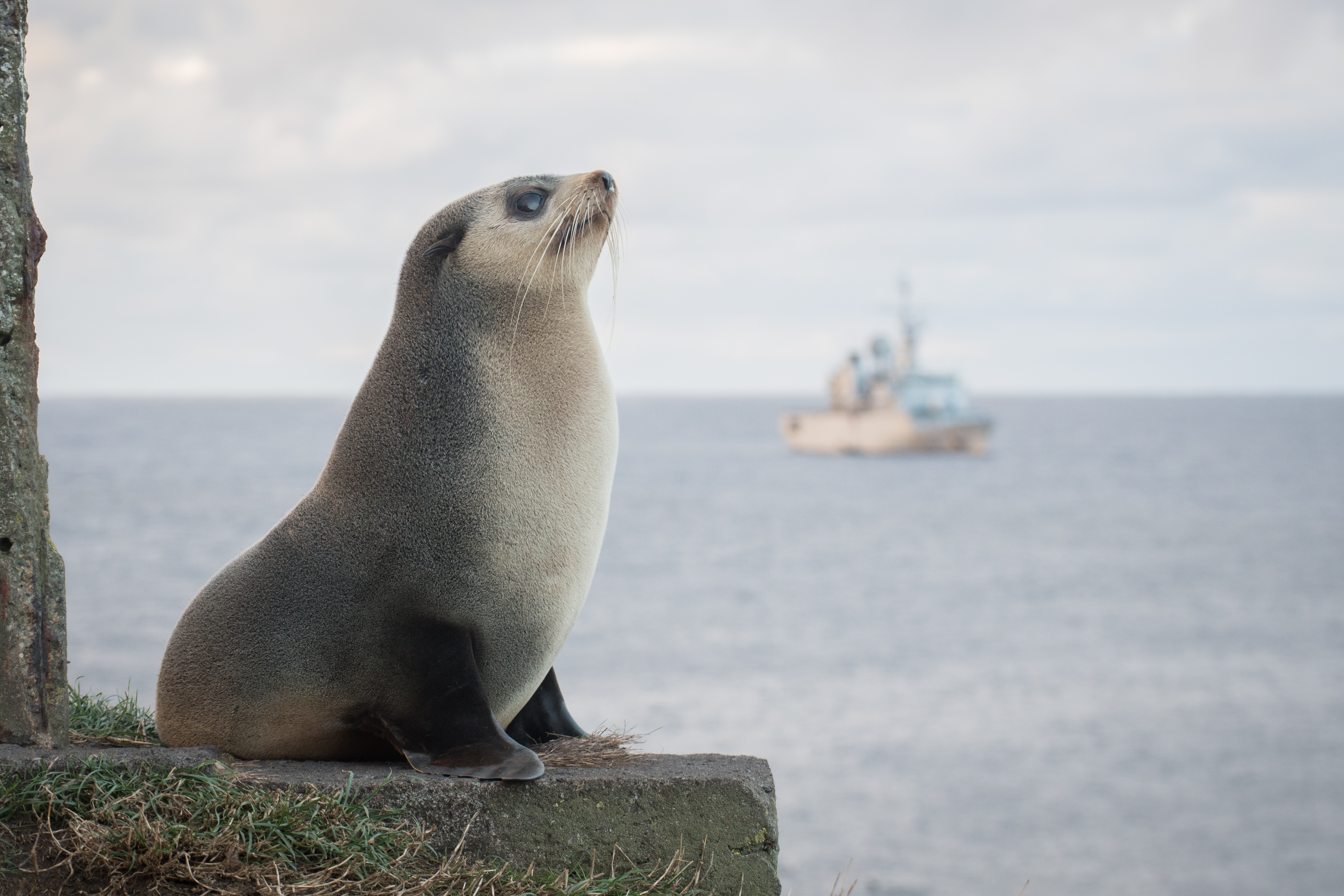

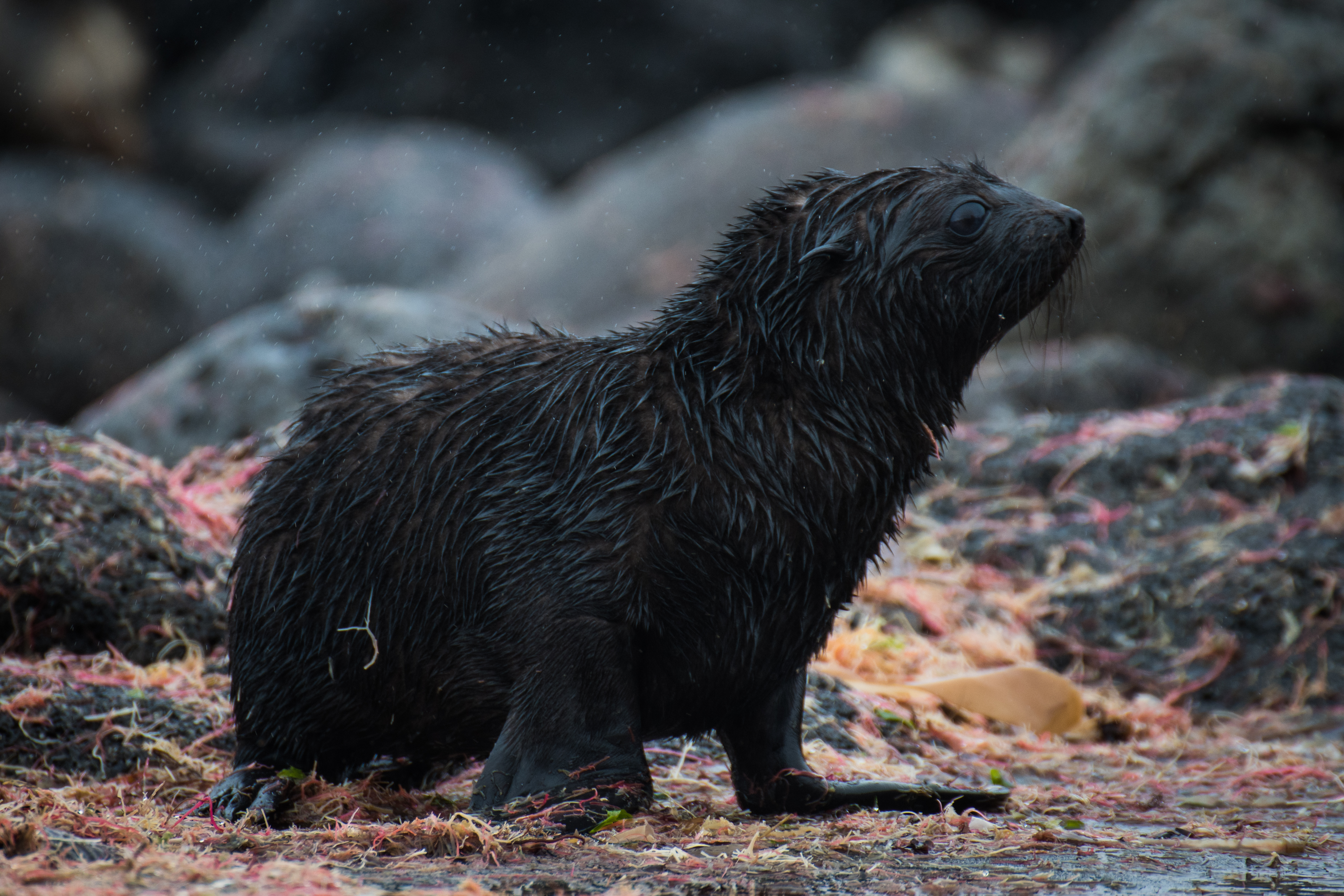

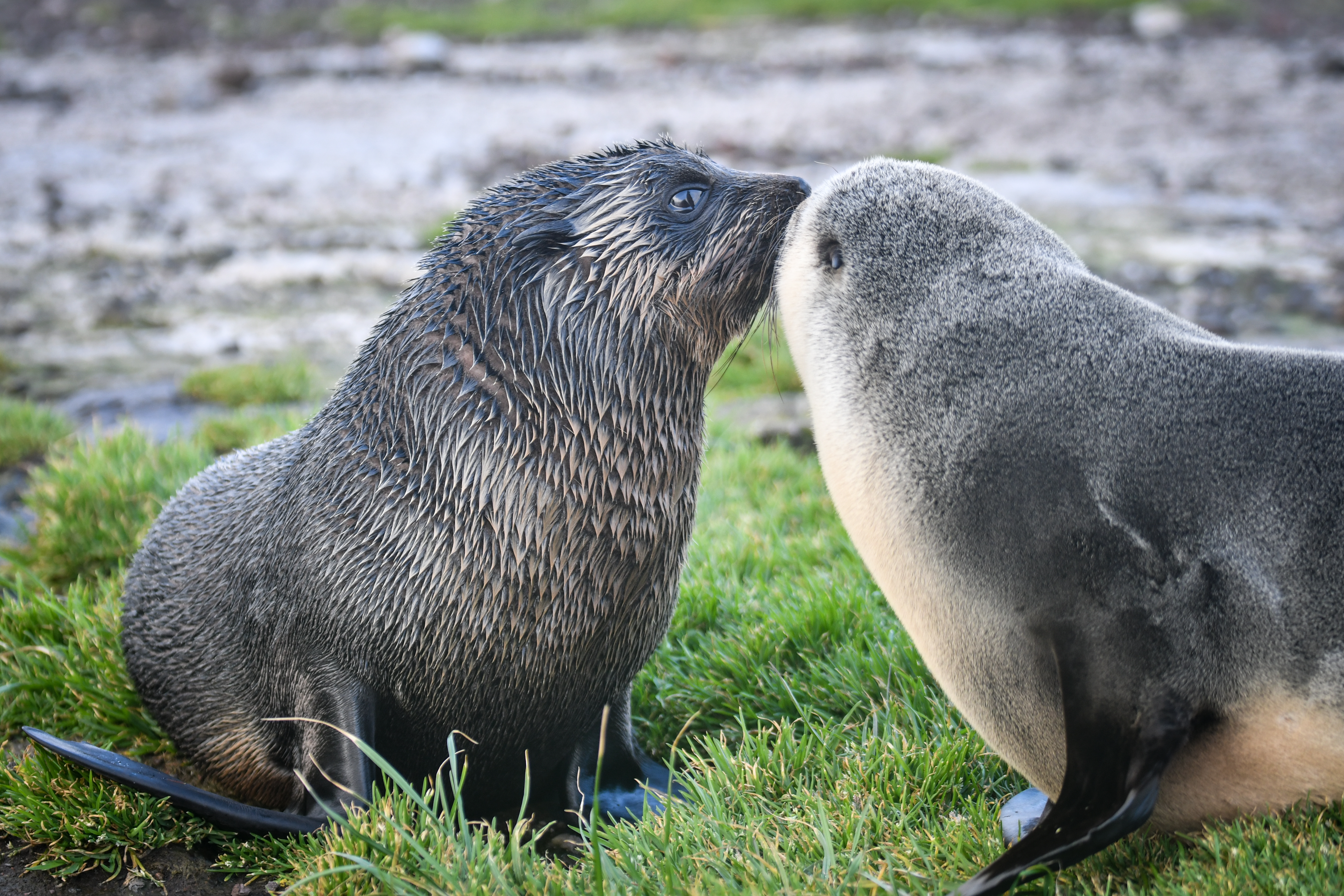

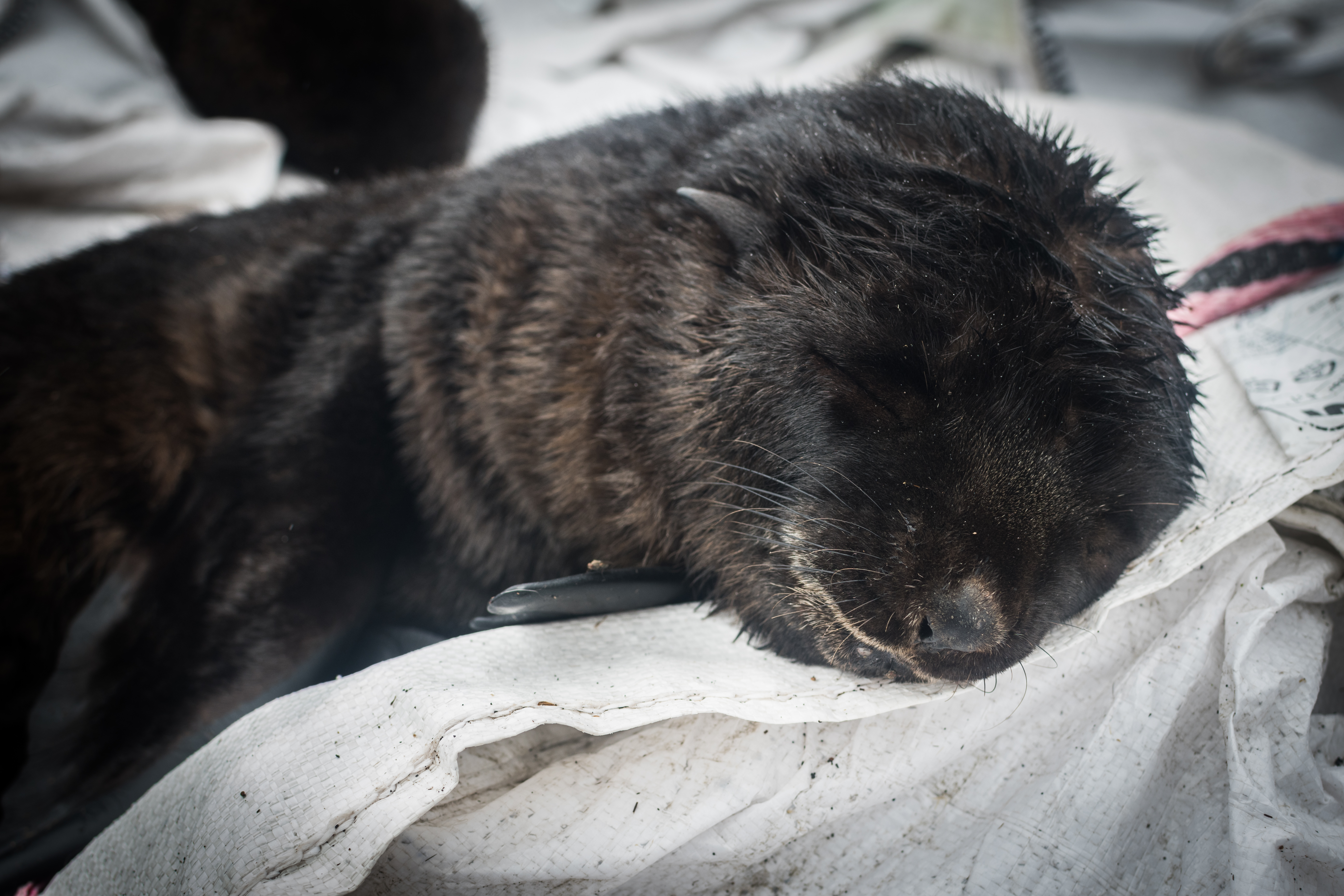

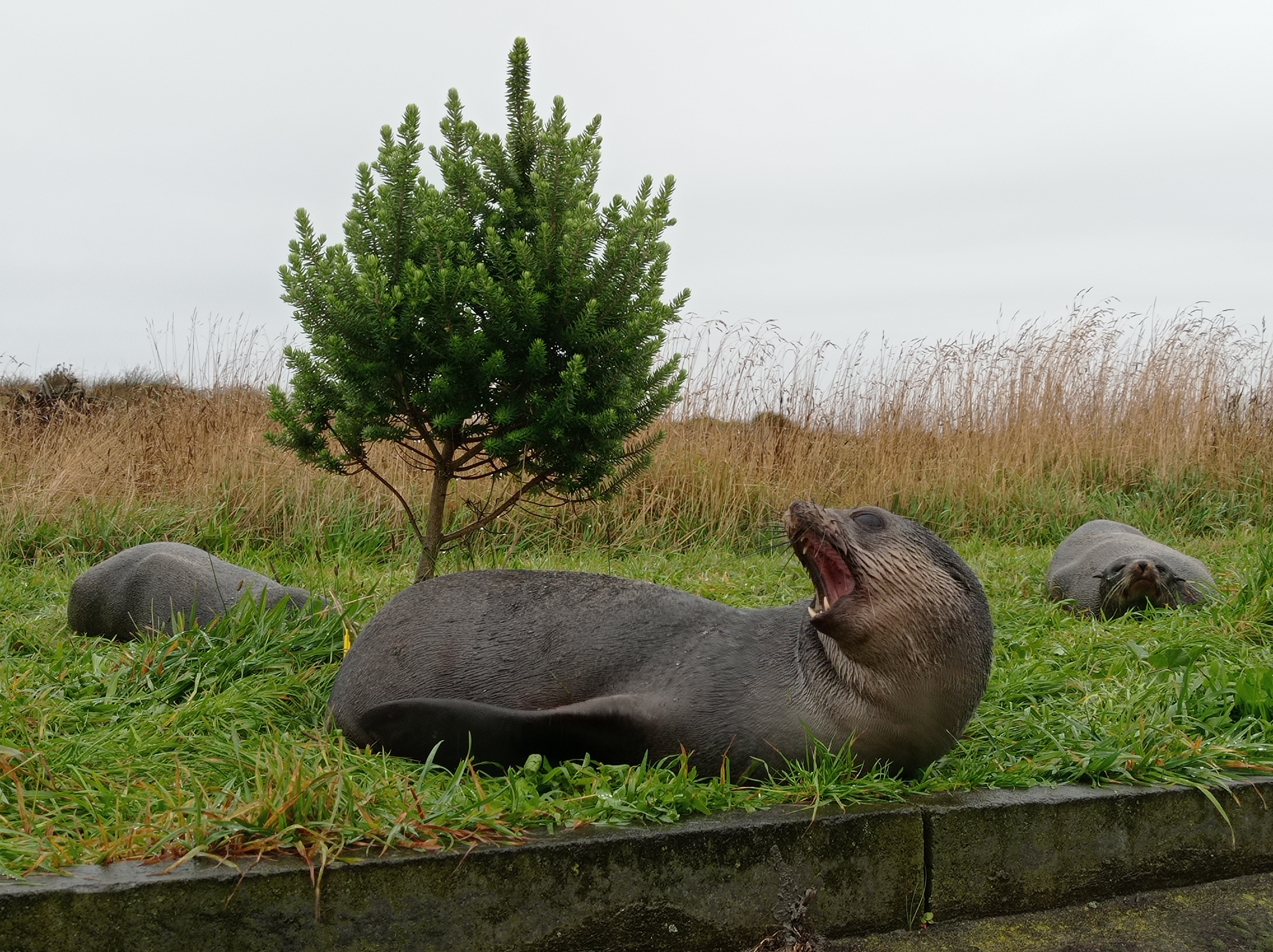

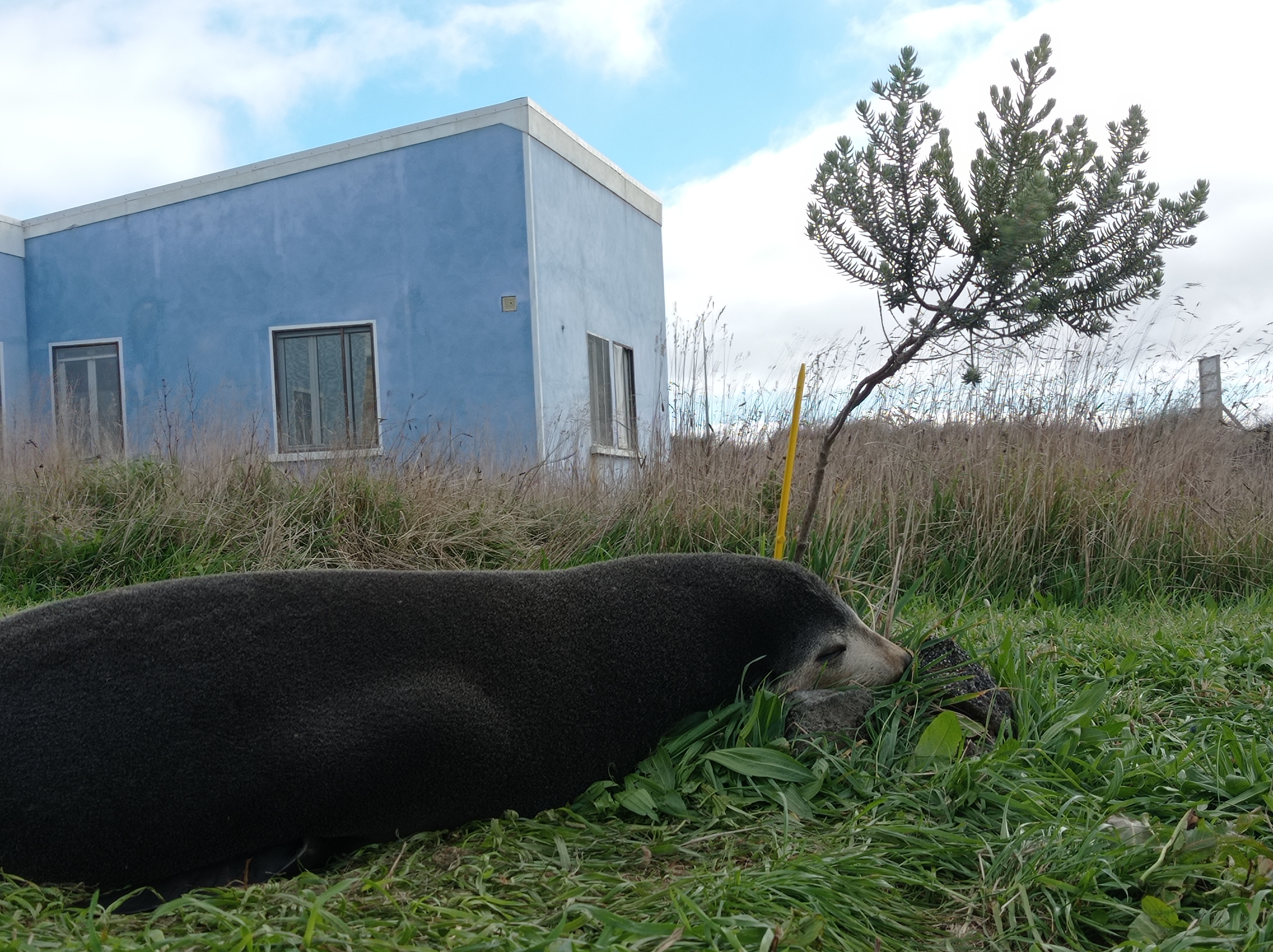

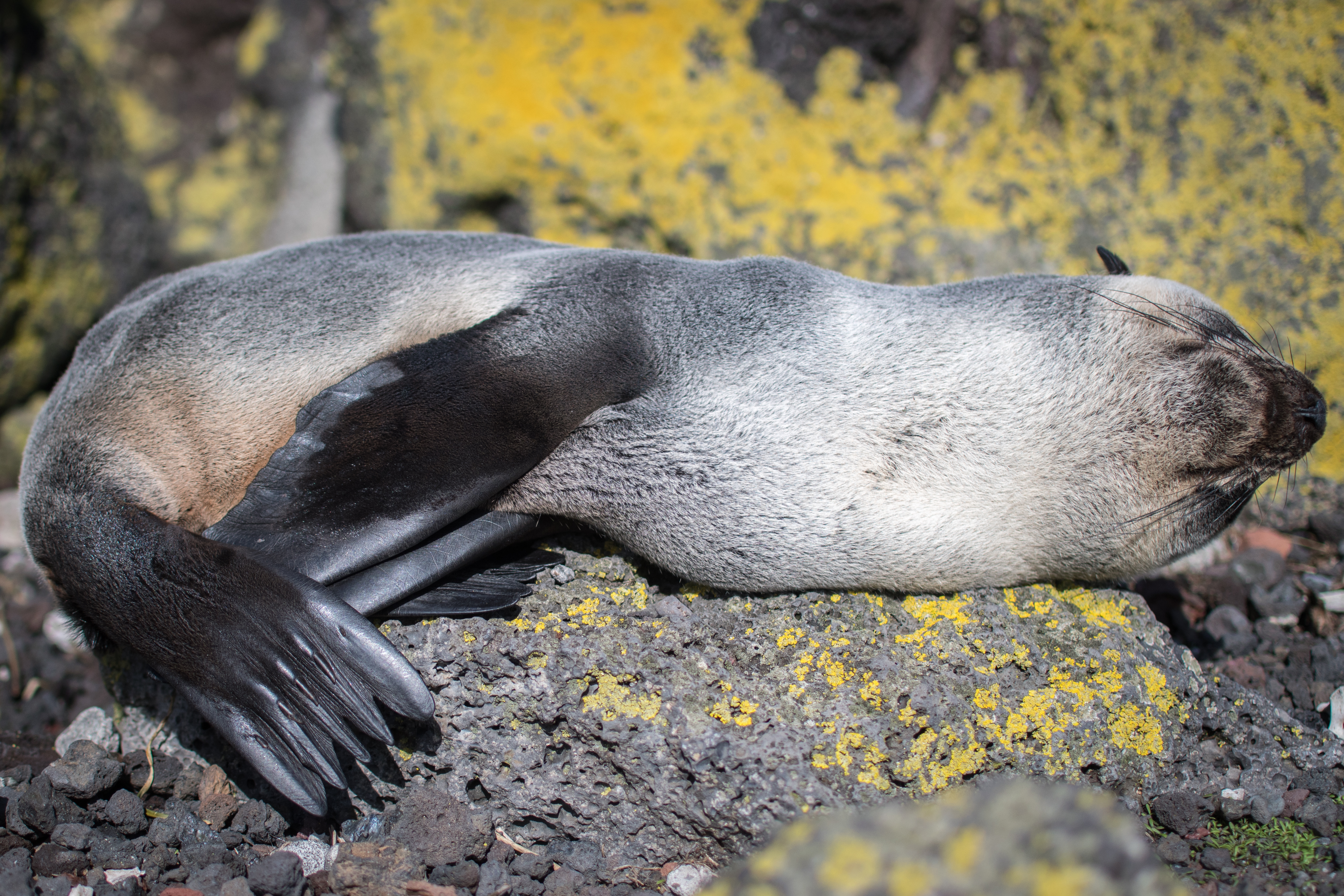

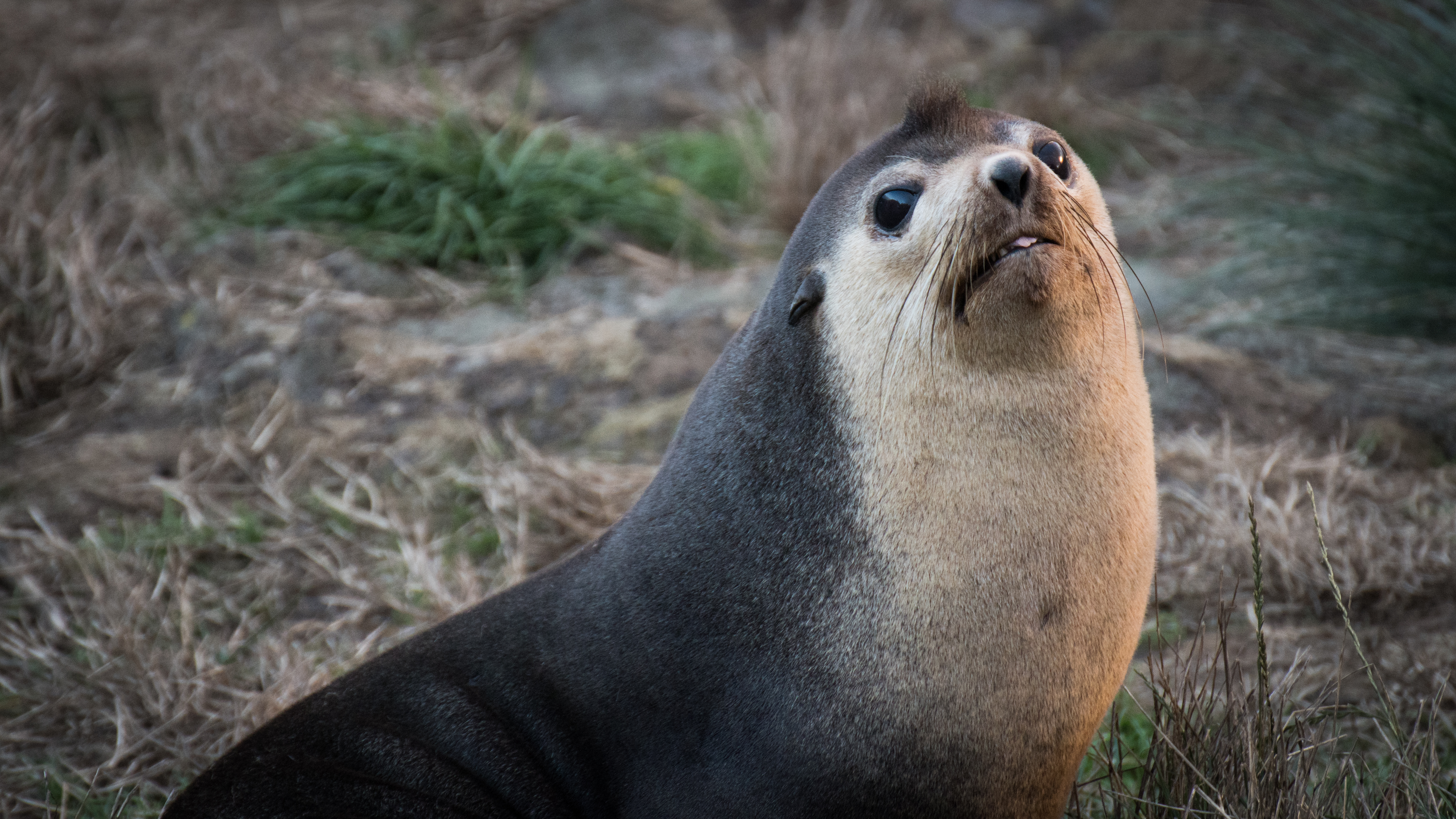

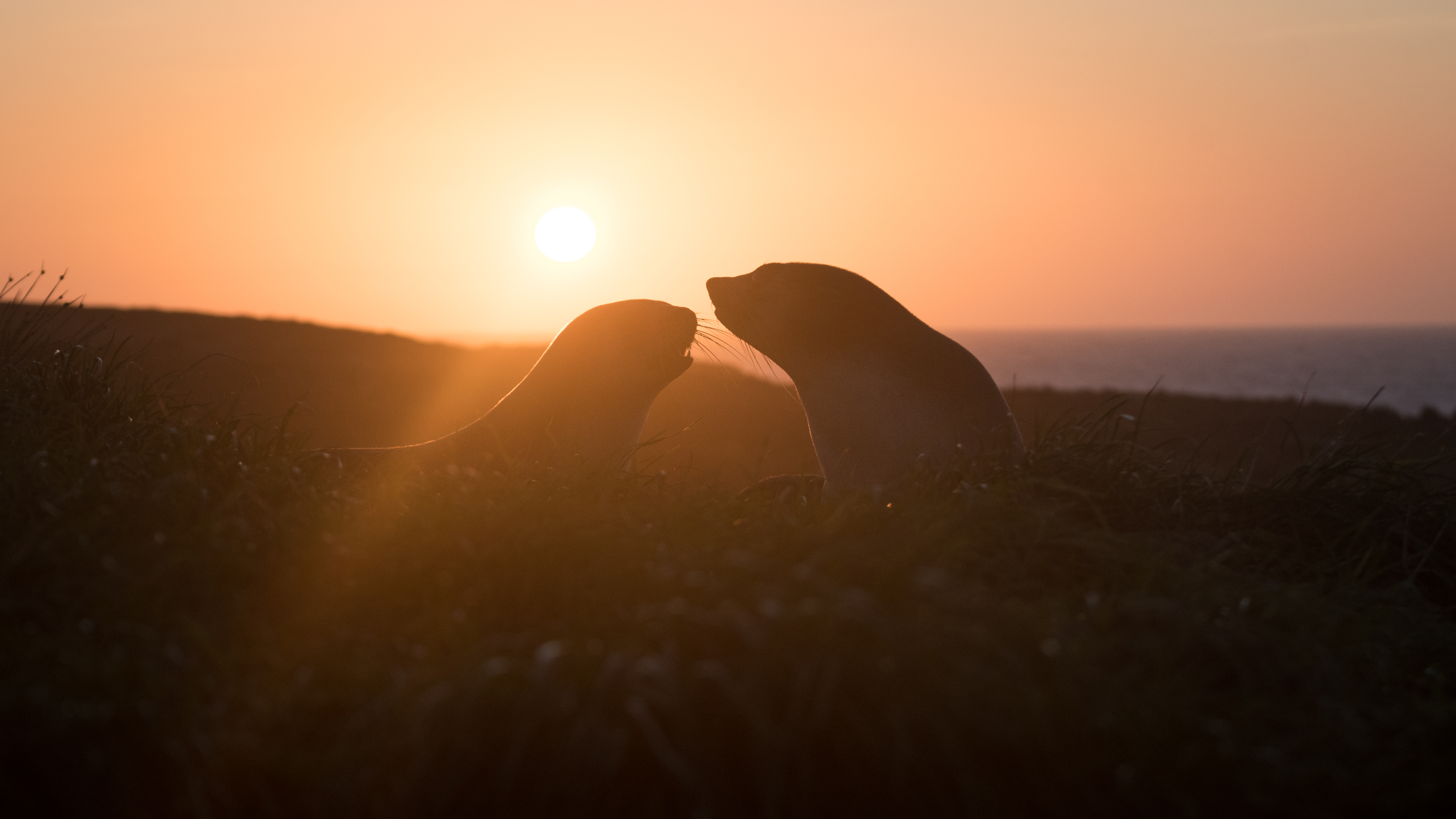

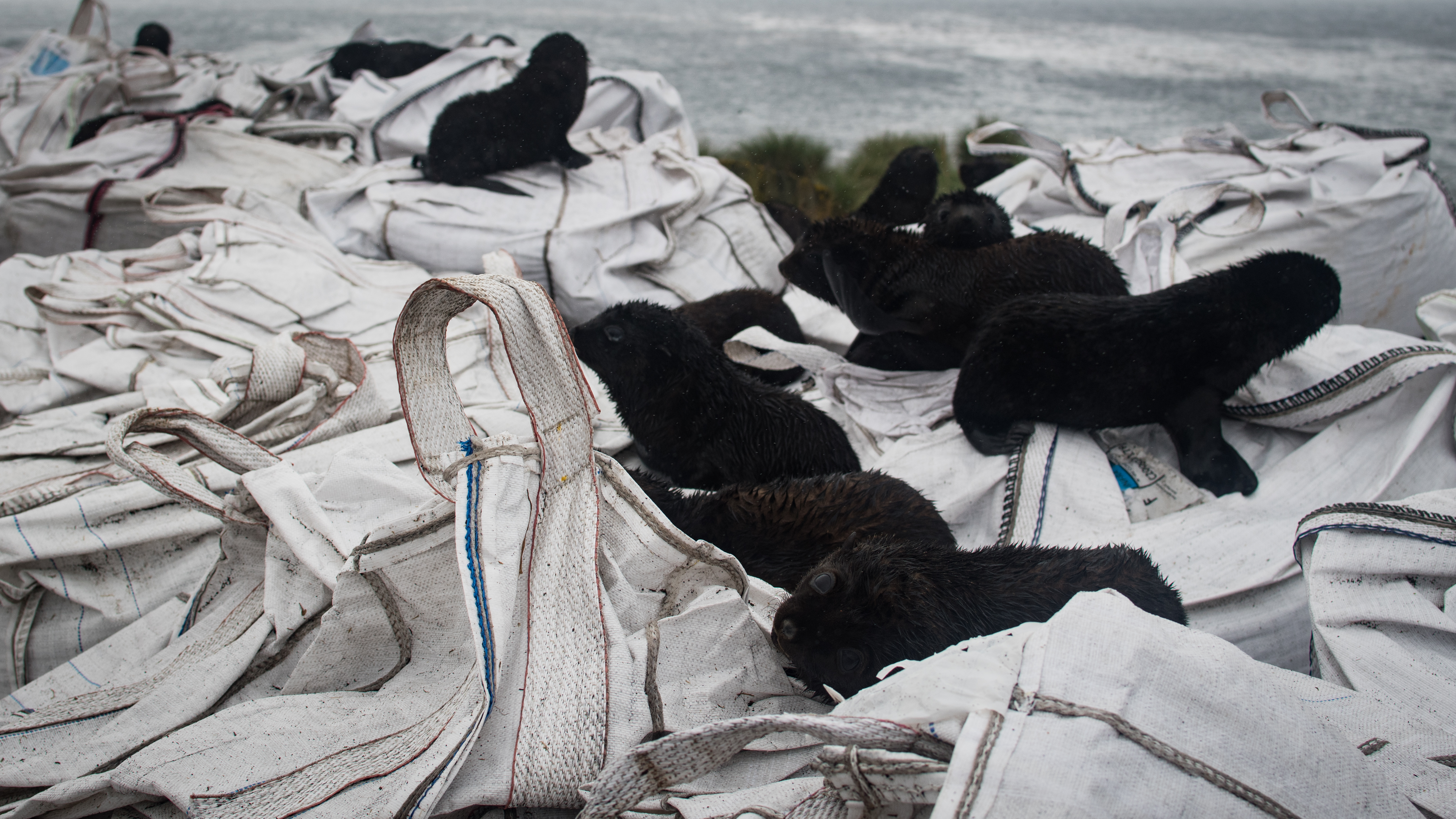

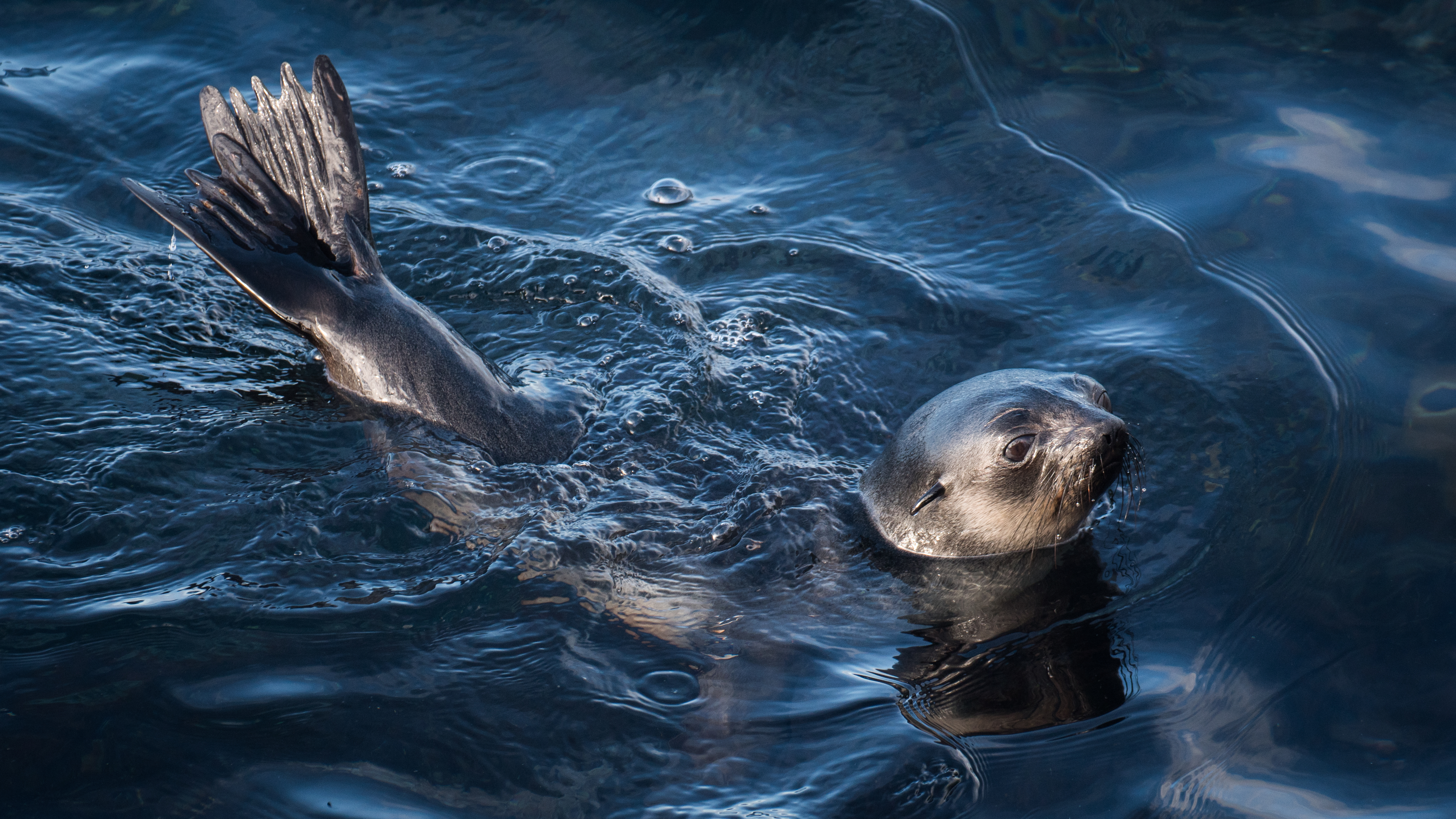

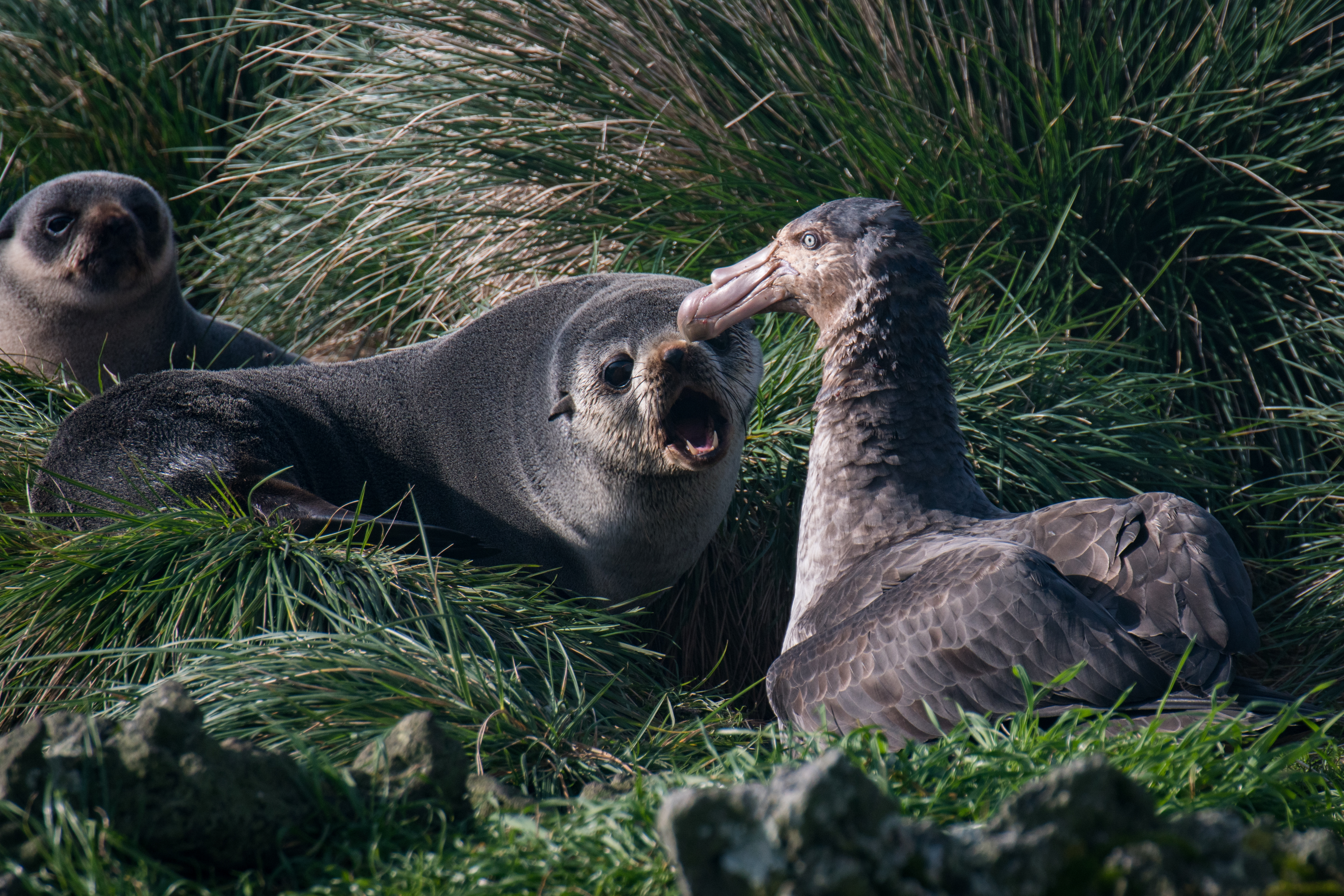

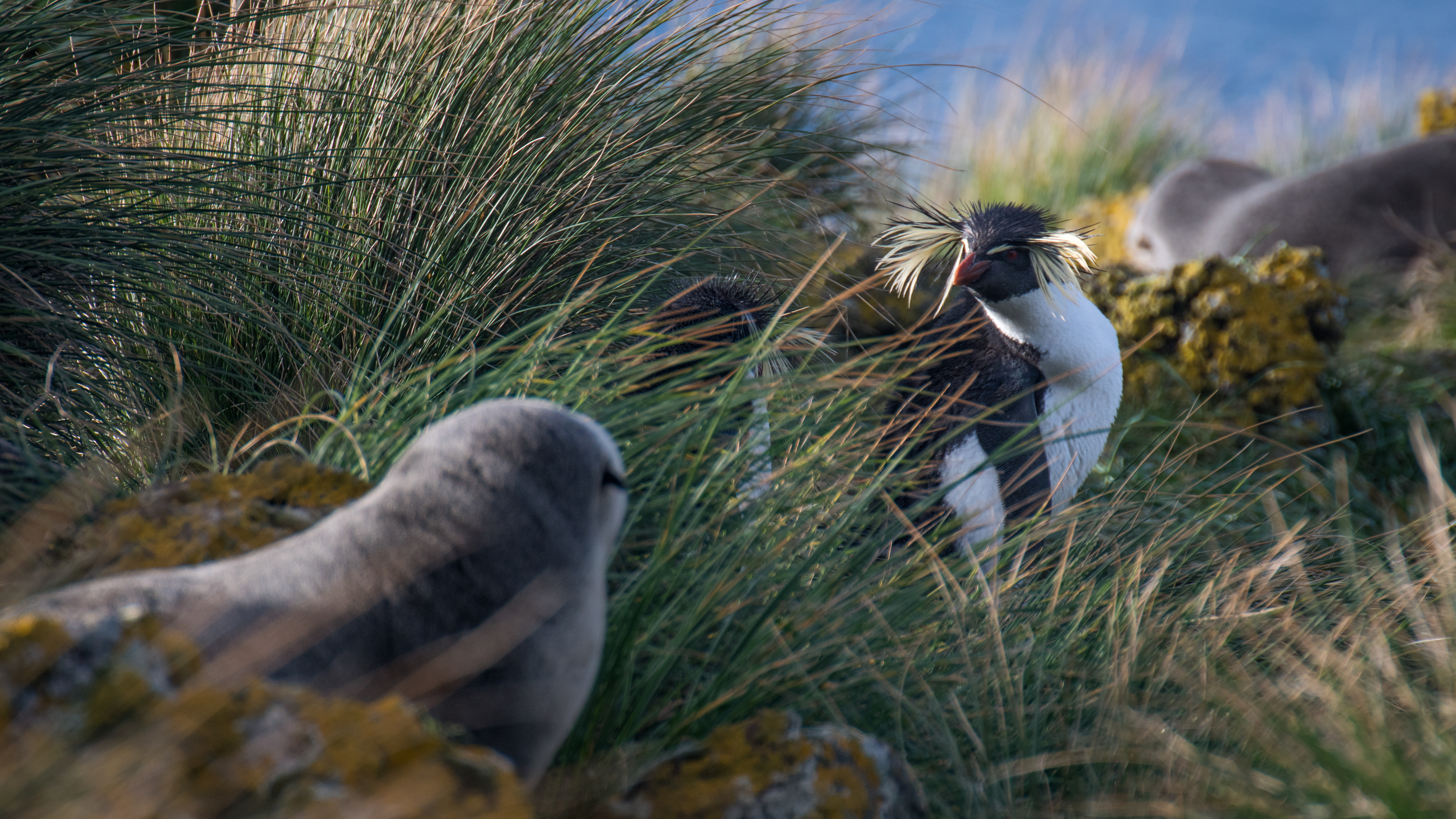

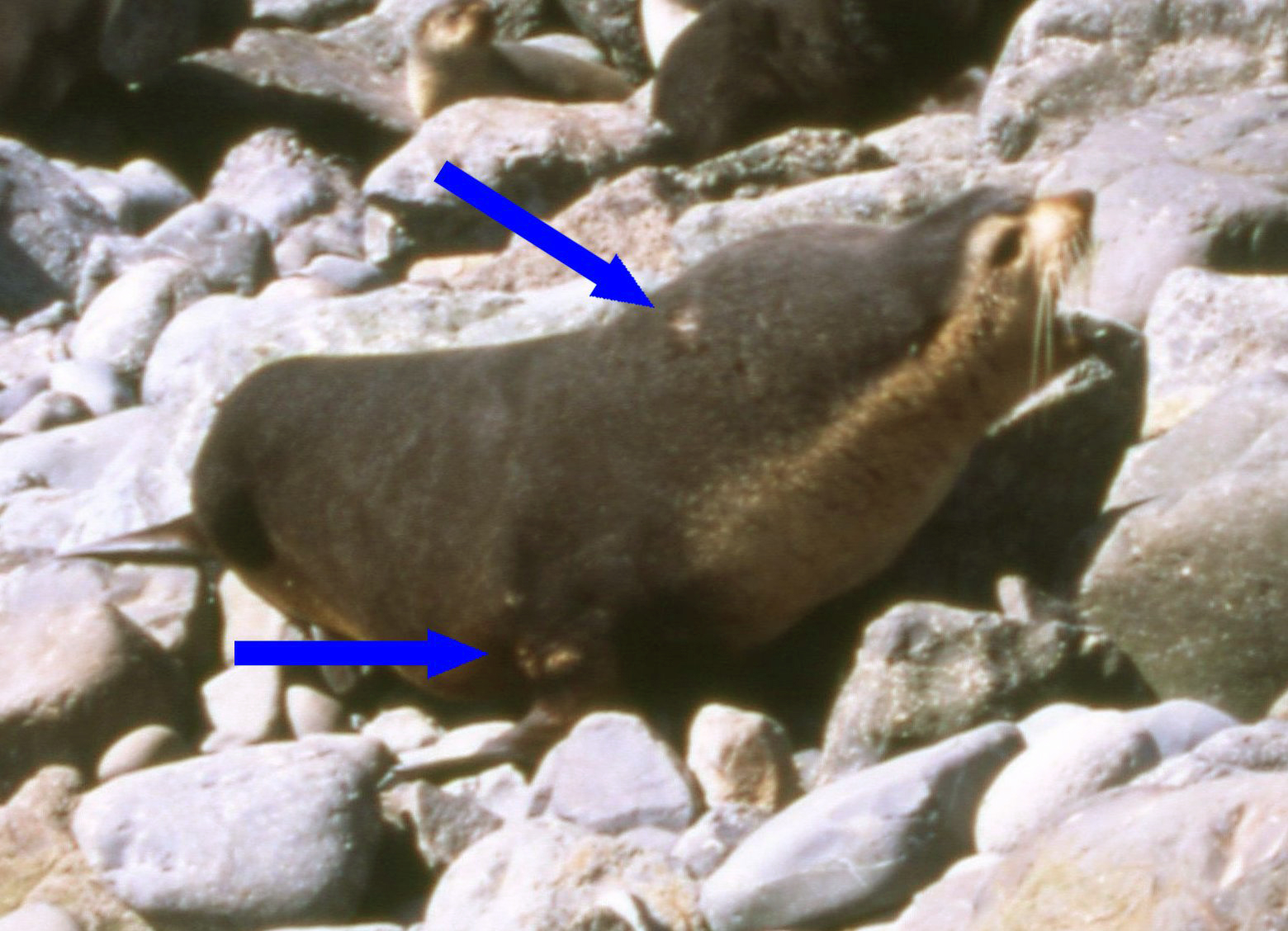

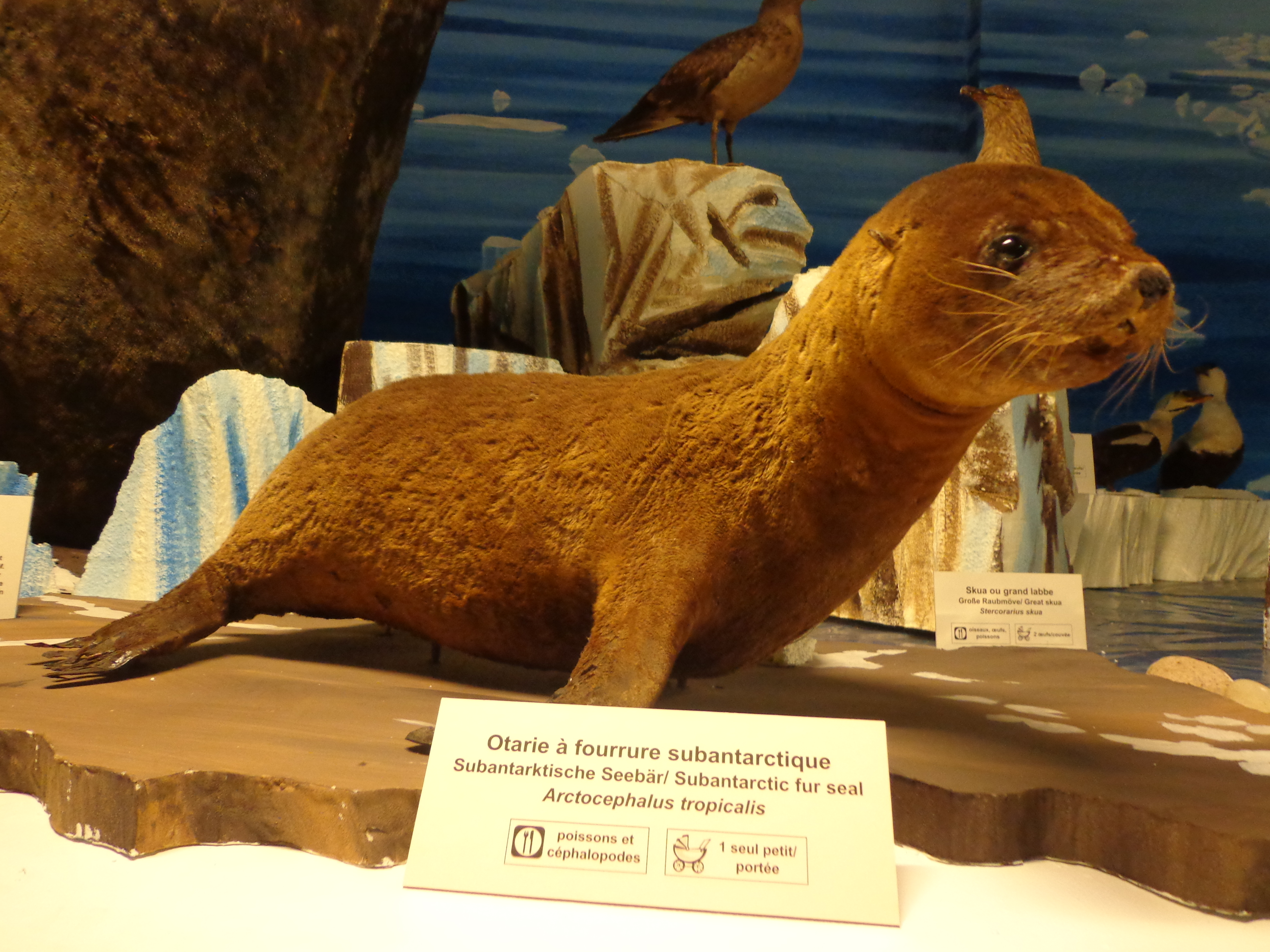

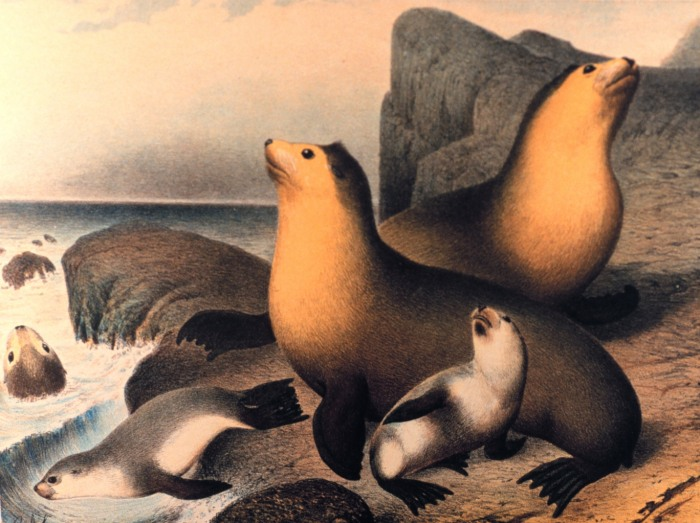
