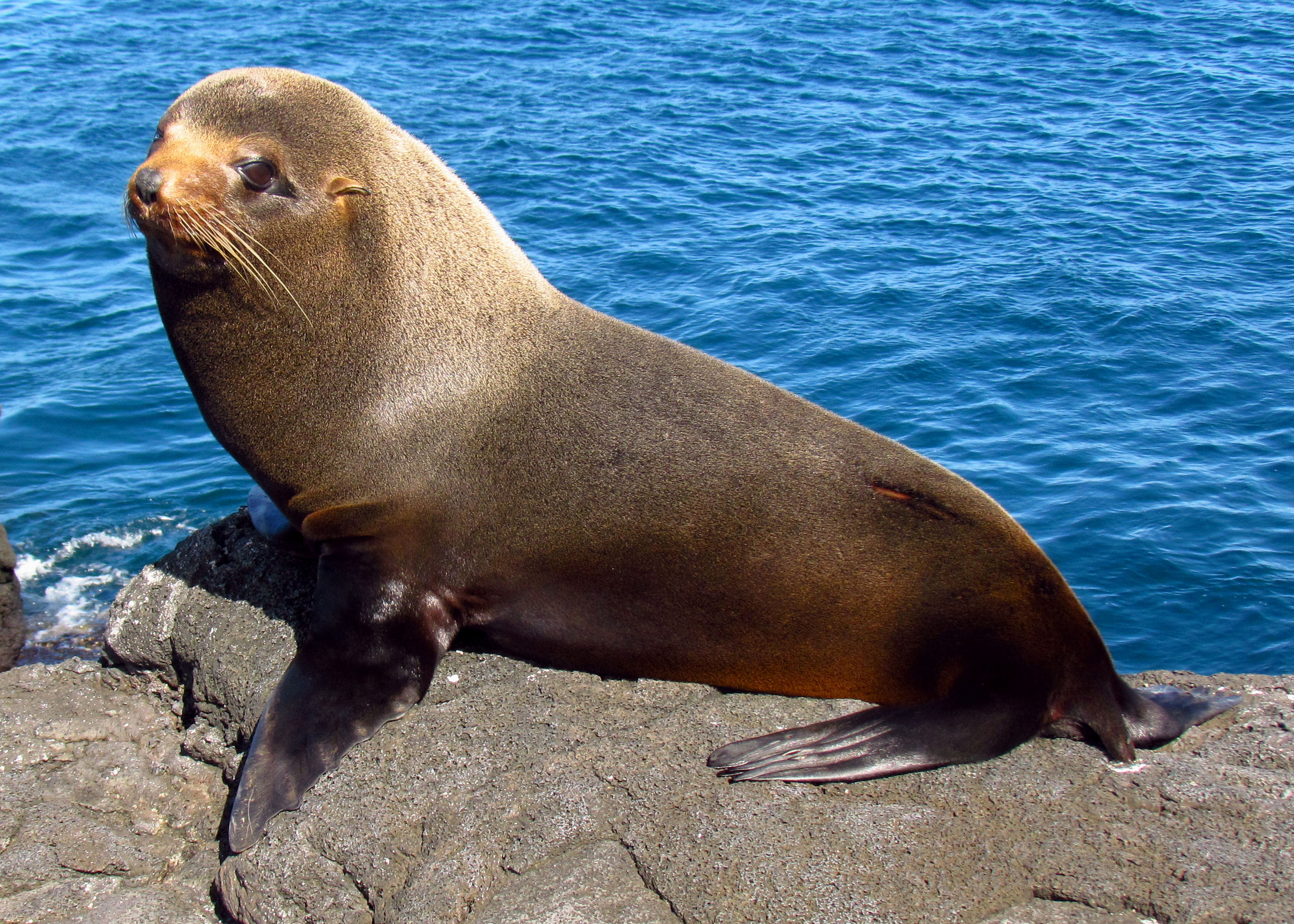
- Male, Santiago Island

Conservation status
- Endangered (IUCN 3.1)
- CITES Appendix II

Scientific classification
- Kingdom: Animalia
- Phylum: Chordata
- Class: Mammalia
- Order: Carnivora
- Parvorder: Pinnipedia
- Family: Otariidae
- Genus: Arctocephalus
- Species: A. galapagoensis

Binomial name
- Arctocephalus galapagoensis Heller, 1904
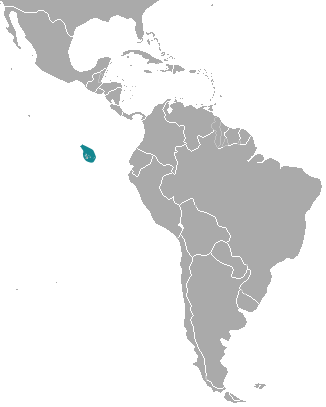
- Galápagos fur seal range

= Galápagos fur seal =

Species of carnivore

The Galápagos fur seal (Arctocephalus galapagoensis) is one of eight seals in the genus Arctocephalus. It is the smallest of all eared seals. It is endemic to the Galápagos Islands in the eastern Pacific. The total estimated population as of 1970 was said to be about 30,000, although the population has been said to be on the decline since the 1980s due to environmental factors such as pollution, disease, invasive species, and their limited territory. Due to the population having been historically vulnerable to hunting, the Galápagos fur seal has been protected by the Ecuadorian government since 1934.

== Description ==
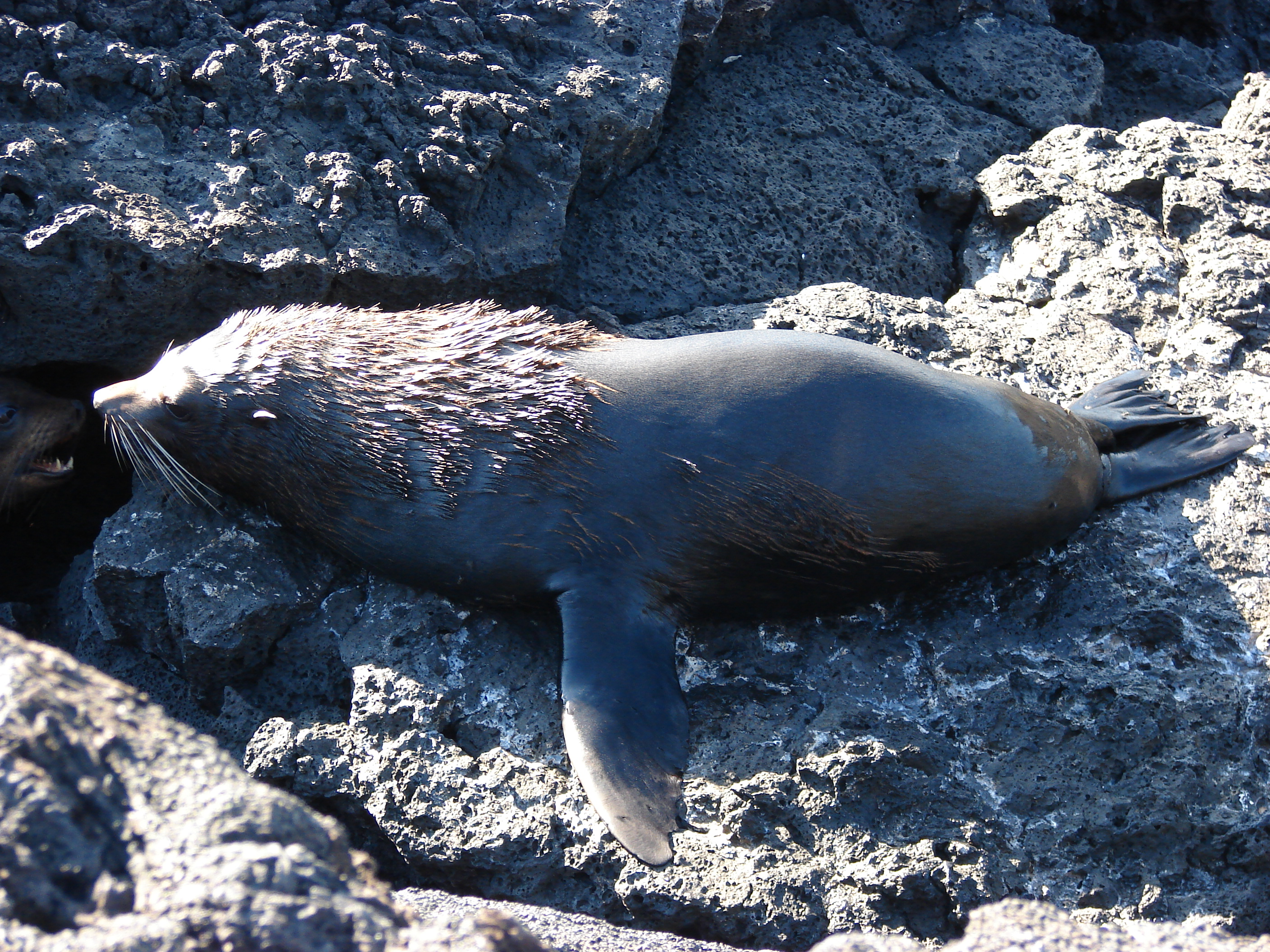
Basking

Galápagos fur seals are the smallest otariids. They are born with a black natal coat that they molt to reveal a lighter brown coat before becoming adults. Of the otariids, Galápagos fur seals display the least amount of sexual dimorphism. The males are up to two times heavier than the females and 1–1.3 times longer. Males grow to be 1.5 m (5 feet) on average and weigh about 64 kg (140 lb). Females grow to be 1.25 m (4 ft 1 in) on average and weigh 27 kg (60 lb). They also have large eyes which allow them to hunt at night. The Galápagos fur seals look very similar to the Galápagos sea lions.

Differences between Galápagos Fur Seal and Galápagos Sea Lion
Galápagos Fur Seal	Trait	Galàpagos Sea Lion
Generally smaller	Size	Generally larger with a greater body length
Thicker fur coat that turns black when wet but when dry looks more goldish	Pelt	Not as much underfur and is a darker color
Larger	Eyes	Smaller
Stick out from head	Ears	Flatter and closer to the head
Found in more shaded areas and rocky coastlines	Distribution	Found on beaches and piers throughout the Galápagos Islands

== Population ==
Over the course of the 19th century, Galápagos fur seals experienced an extreme decrease in their population size due to sealing. Their population was able to recover in the 20th century. Around the late 1970s, there was an estimate of around 30,000 of them, and even though they were able to partially recover from their protection in the Galapagos, they still experienced multiple shifts in their population due to other environmental factors in the late 1980s that have resulted in a decline. Most fur seals have been found around the northern and western areas of the Archipelago. Even though there has not been a lot of evidence of immigration of this species, there were sightings in Ecuador during an El Niño event and southern Mexico.

== Range and habitat ==
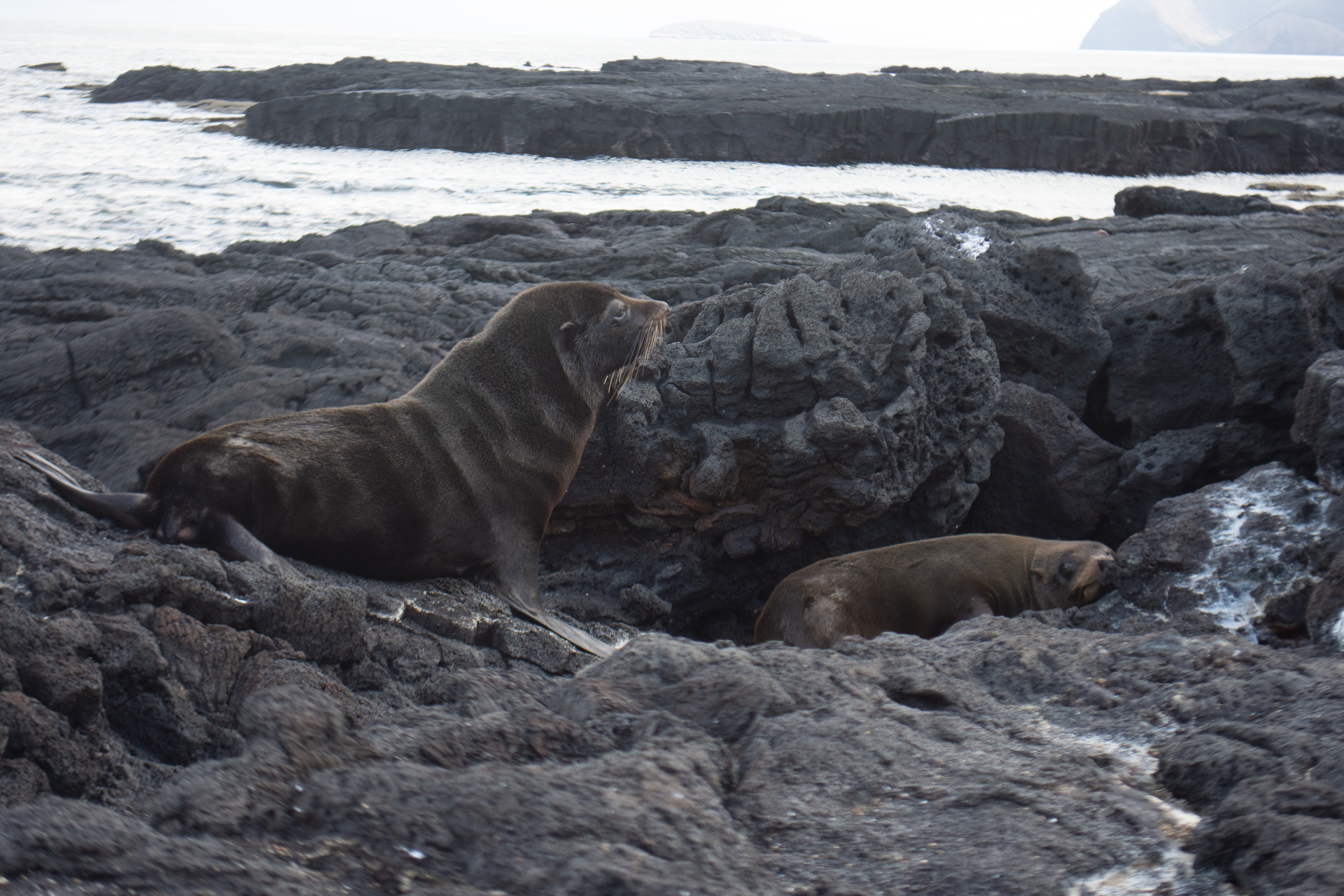
Galápagos fur seals found on rock ledges and crevices

The Galápagos fur seal is endemic to the Galapagos Islands in Ecuador, South America. It is present on nearly all the islands of the Galapagos. They are typically found close to the coastline where there are rock ledges and crevices that they can find shade in, in such a warm climate. It is classified as a non-migrant species. Females that are lactating do not travel long distances and tend to stay within the colony and only have moderately brief outings when they do venture out. However, recent research has documented the presence of Galápagos fur seals in Mexico and Guatemala.

== Reproduction ==
Galápagos fur seals live in large colonies on the rocky beaches of the Galápagos Islands. These colonies are then divided into territories by the male seals during breeding season, which is mid-August to mid-November, with a peak in late September and early October. Each successful reproductive female will choose a territory on the beach to pup on.

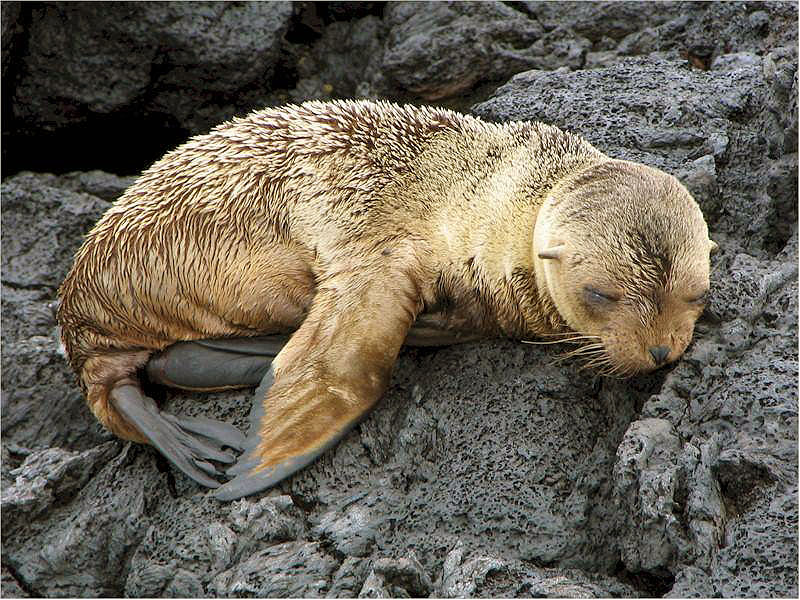
Galápagos fur seal pup

=== Maternal care ===
Galápagos fur seals have the lowest reproductive rate reported in seals, and it takes an unusually long time to raise seal pups to independence. Females bear only one pup at a time, and she remains with her newborn for a week before leaving to feed. She then periodically returns to the pup and stays to suckle it for a few days before leaving on another hunting trip. Females recognize their own pups by smell and sound, and pups also learn to identify their mothers by the females' "pup attraction calls". Mother-pup recognition is crucial because females exclusively nurse their own pups, often violently rejecting strange pups that approach. Orphaned seal pups usually try to sneak up on sleeping or calling females to suckle, but stealing milk is not enough to sustain the pups, and they usually die within a month.

=== Interbrood conflict ===
Fur seal pups rely on their mother's milk for the first eighteen months, and weaning may be delayed for up to two or three years if conditions are poor. The result is that every year up to 23% of pups are born when an older sibling is still suckling. Survival of the younger sibling greatly depends on the availability of resources. In years when there is abundant food, the mortality rate of second pups is as low as 5%, which is equivalent to the mortality rate of pups without siblings. In years when food is scarce, 80% of pups with suckling older siblings die within a month. The younger sibling thus serves as an insurance in case the first sibling dies, and also provides extra reproductive value in case conditions prove better than expected. Such a bet-hedging strategy is particularly useful in Galapagos fur seals, since there is a great deal of maternal investment in raising a seal pup to independence in an environment that has great fluctuations in food.

The high level of resource uncertainty, late weaning, and potential overlap time of suckling young all lead to violent sibling rivalry and provide a good environment for studying parent-offspring conflict. From an offspring's point of view, it would be most beneficial to continue suckling and receive more than its fair share of milk, but to the mother seal, it would pay to wean the older, more independent offspring in order to invest in the next pup. Thus, studies show that 75% of mothers intervened, often aggressively, when the older sibling harassed the newborn pups. Mothers would bite or lift the older offspring roughly by its skin, which sometimes caused open wounds. Maternal aggression towards the older sibling diminishes with time after the second sibling's birth. Even without direct aggression, older siblings may still indirectly harm their younger siblings by outcompeting them for milk. The older offspring usually suckles first and allows their younger sibling access to the mother only after it is satiated, resulting in very little milk left over for the younger pup. Thus, the younger siblings often die from starvation.

During periods when there is very little prey, interbrood conflict increases. Galápagos fur seal population is drastically affected by El Niño, a period accompanied by high water temperatures and a deepening thermocline. Food becomes scarce during El Niño, and thus older seals exhibit an intense aversion to weaning, causing the mother seal to neglect the younger sibling.

=== Male competition ===
Males will compete for the females when they become large enough by establishing territories on the beaches. The beaches are valuable pupping substrate for females. They have territories that average 200 m^{2} (2,200 sq ft). This is large compared to amount of territory occupied by most otariid males.

== Feeding and predation ==
The Galápagos fur seal feeds primarily on fish, squid and shellfish. They feed relatively close to shore and near the surface, but have been seen at depths of 169 m (554 ft). They primarily feed at night because their prey is much easier to catch then. During normal years, food is relatively plentiful. However, during an El Niño year, there can be fierce competition for food, and many young pups die during these years. The adult seals feed themselves before their young and during particularly rough El Niño years, most of the young seal populations will die.

The Galápagos fur seal has virtually no constant predators. Occasionally, sharks and orcas have been seen feeding on the seals, but this is very rare. Sharks and orcas are the main predator of most other seal species, but their migration paths do not usually pass the Galápagos.

== Conservation ==
=== Anthropogenic Threats ===
The Galápagos Islands are heavily trafficked by tourists. However, tourism is well regulated and restricted by the Ecuadorian government. Collisions with boats which frequent the waters near the islands could also be fatal to the Galapagos fur seals. Historically, the Galápagos fur seal has also been threatened by hunting and invasive species. Whalers and sealers used to hunt the seals for their fur. The threat of hunting has been removed since the declaration of the Galápagos islands as a national park and the protection of the species under law.

=== Environmental Threats ===
The fur seals' habitat is naturally restricted which makes them more threatened by environmental changes. Other potential and existing threats are tourism, oil spills, and boat collisions. Oil spills would be particularly damaging to the fur seal as their thick pelage is an important part of their thermoregulation. The waters near the archipelago are trafficked by vessels of ranging sizes that could contain and release moderate amounts of oil.

Isabela Island was documented as having a population of dogs that were known to kill the Galápagos fur seals. Since then all of the feral dog population on Isabela Island has been exterminated and the seals no longer face this threat. Now, the biggest direct threats to Galápagos fur seals involve climate change which includes ocean warming as well as ESNO weather events. Some of the indirect threats for them are marine pollution, pathogen spillovers, and bycatch. There is not a lot known about the relation between pathogens and pinnipeds, but there were diseases found carried by dogs and cats on Isabela Island.

=== Biological and Chemical Pollution ===
Animals such as rats, domestic dogs, and feral cats are considered to be a threat to the Galápagos fur seals because they can be both hosts and carriers of infectious diseases. These diseases would then be spread to marine mammals. Although the fur seals are not exactly in close proximity to many domestic animals, feral cats are typically found around the islands. Many tests were done on such dogs and cats, and these proved that they are exposed to many pathogens. This could result in the fur seals being at risk of getting infected by cats and dogs. Both Galápagos fur seals and sea lions were tested to see if they had strains that were susceptible to the bacterium found in the cats and dogs. From the results of a PCR analysis, it was found that 70% of the tissue samples had the presence of multiple strains. In the past few years, the presence of these strains could have resulted in lower mortality rates for the sea lions. If sea lions are infected by this in the future, this could affect fur seals as well since sea lions have specific regional movements which will most likely have a huge contribution to the spreading of these pathogens, as they may infect multiple fur seal colonies. The Galápagos fur seal's health was also exposed to danger by chemical pollution, such as chemical attacks by hydrocarbons, metals, oil spills, and other organics pollutants referred to as persistent organic pollutants (POPs). The two most popular POPs that threatened the fur seals are toxic and bioaccumulative. This was uncovered through the discovery of different pesticides in the fur seals, raising many concerns for their health.

=== Status ===
Galápagos fur seals have had a declining population since the 19th century. Thousands of these seals were killed for their fur in the 1800s by poachers. Starting in 1959, Ecuador established strict laws to protect these animals. The government of Ecuador declared the Galápagos Islands a national park, and since then no major poaching has occurred. Despite the laws, another tragic blow to their population occurred during the 1982–1983 El Niño weather event. Almost all of the seal pups died, and about 30% of the adult population was wiped out. Since 1983, no major calamity has occurred to decrease their population significantly.

=== Efforts ===
Under the IUCN red list, Galápagos fur seals are classified as an endangered species due to the fluctuation in their population and the decline in their population size over the past 30 years. The seals are now protected by Ecuadorian law as is most of their habitat. They are also protected under the Special Law of the National Park and Galápagos Marine Reserve. This National Park was established in 1959 along with the Ecuadorian Law. This meant there was more management and protection of the area as well as its surrounding waters where there is a no-fishing zone for many miles. Since they are located in a national park, sometimes the tourism is heavy but it is well regulated and so the seals are protected. The National Park Service has also been able to regulate the feral dogs that have attacked and killed many Galápagos fur seals in the past. In 1991 Ecuador started a plan for the conservation of marine mammals, including Galápagos fur seals, in the southeast Pacific. As of now, people are trying to study the risk of marine plastic pollution to the wildlife in this area including the fur seals under what is known as the Plastic Pollution Free Galapagos program. It is also important to note that the Galápagos Islands was one of the first places to be identified as a Natural World Heritage Site which helps preserve the island even more. Galápagos fur seals continue to face threats to their population due to their limited distribution across the islands of the Archipelago.
