= List of pinnipeds =

Species in mammal infraorder Pinnipedia

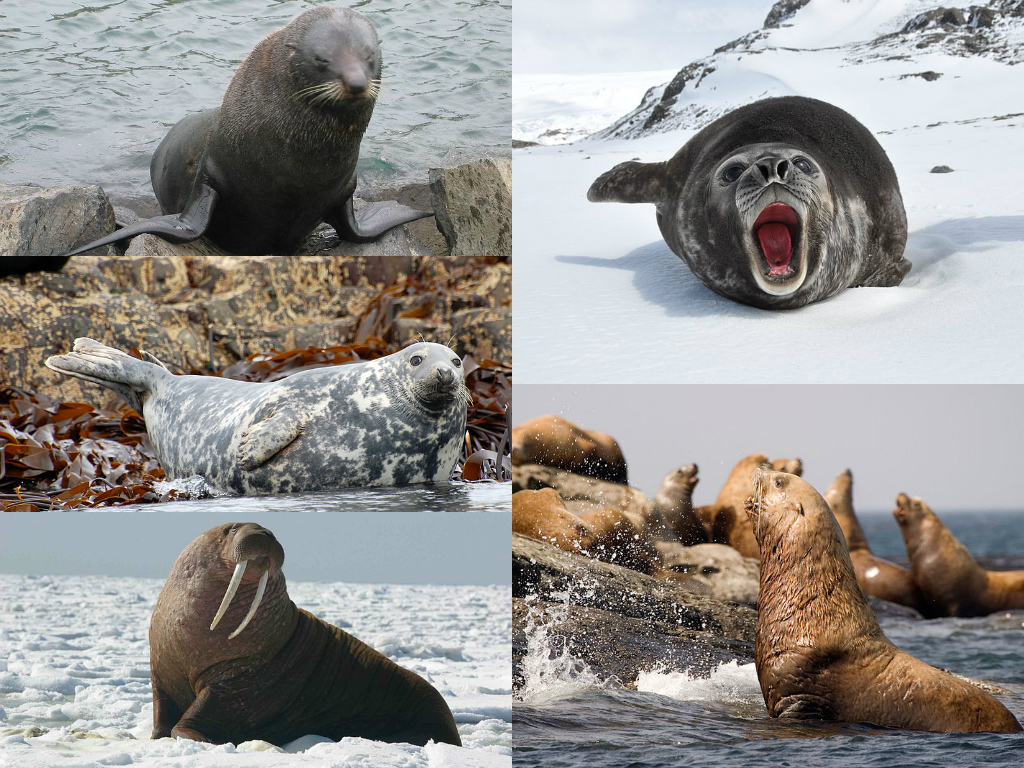
Five pinniped species, clockwise from top left: New Zealand fur seal (Arctocephalus forsteri), southern elephant seal (Mirounga leonina), Steller sea lion (Eumetopias jubatus), walrus (Odobenus rosmarus), and grey seal (Halichoerus grypus)

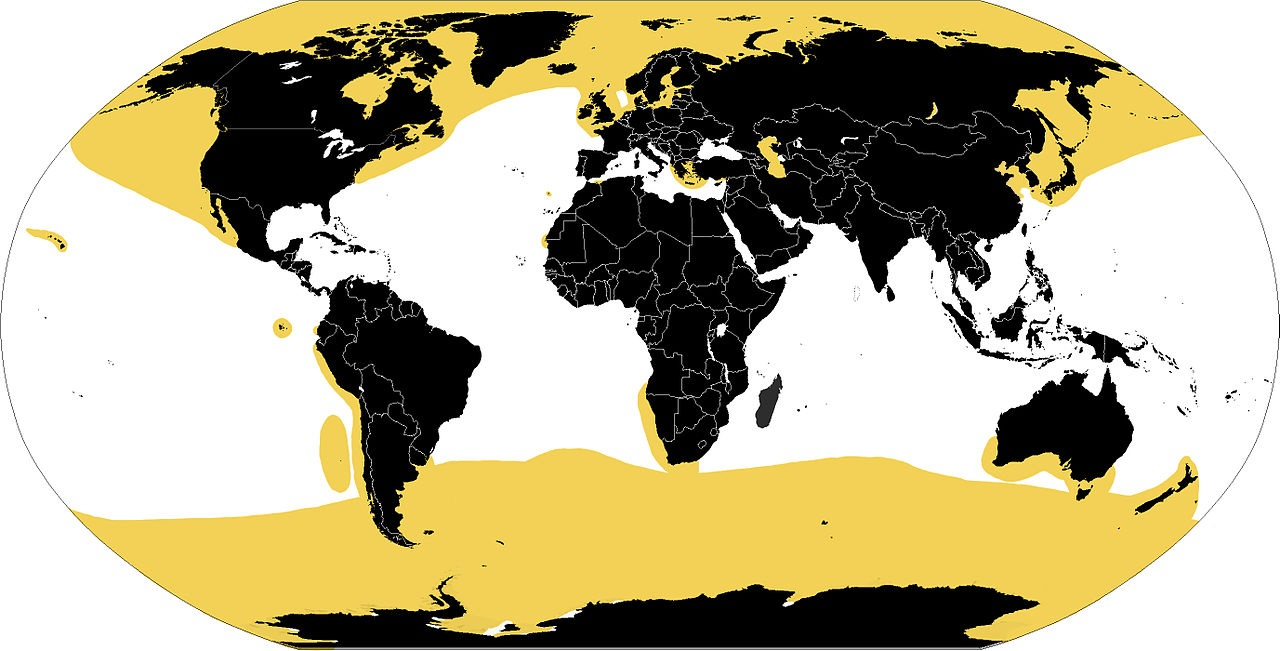
Combined range of all pinnipeds

Pinnipedia is an infraorder of mammals in the order Carnivora, composed of seals, sea lions, and the walrus. A member of this group is called a pinniped or a seal. (Note: "Seal" can refer to the entire pinniped infraorder, but is often also used to mean either pinnipeds with the exception of the walrus, or fur seals and true seals while excluding the walrus and sea lions.) They are widespread throughout the ocean and some larger lakes, primarily in colder waters. Pinnipeds range in size from the 1.1 m (3 ft 7 in) and 50 kg (110 lb) Baikal seal to the 6 m (20 ft) and 3,700 kg (8,200 lb) male southern elephant seal, which is also the largest member of Carnivora. Several species exhibit sexual dimorphism, such as the southern elephant seal, where the males can be more than three times as long and six times as massive as the females, or the Ross seal, which has females typically larger than the males. Four seal species are estimated to have over one million members, while seven are classified as endangered with population counts as low as 3,000, and two, the Caribbean monk seal and the Japanese sea lion, went extinct in the 20th century.

The 34 extant species of Pinnipedia are split into 22 genera within 3 families: Odobenidae, comprising the walrus; Otariidae, the eared seals, split between the sea lions and fur seals; and Phocidae, the earless or true seals. Odobenidae and Otariidae are combined into the superfamily Otarioidea, with Phocidae in Phocoidea. Extinct species have also been placed into the three extant families, as well as the extinct family Desmatophocidae, though most extinct species have not been categorized into a subfamily. Nearly one hundred extinct Pinnipedia species have been discovered, though due to ongoing research and discoveries the exact number and categorization is not fixed.

== Conventions ==
IUCN Red List categories
Conservation status
- EX: Extinct (2 species)
- EW: Extinct in the wild (0 species)
- CR: Critically endangered (0 species)
- EN: Endangered (7 species)
- VU: Vulnerable (5 species)
- NT: Near threatened (3 species)
- LC: Least concern (19 species)

The author citation for the species or genus is given after the scientific name; parentheses around the author citation indicate that this was not the original taxonomic placement. Conservation status codes listed follow the International Union for Conservation of Nature (IUCN) Red List of Threatened Species. Range maps are provided wherever possible; if a range map is not available, a description of the pinniped's range is provided. Ranges are based on the IUCN Red List for that species unless otherwise noted. All extinct species or subspecies listed alongside extant species went extinct after 1500 CE, and are indicated by a dagger symbol "†".

== Classification ==
The infraorder Pinnipedia consists of 3 families containing 34 extant species belonging to 22 genera and divided into 48 subspecies, as well the extinct Caribbean monk seal and Japanese sea lion species, which are the only pinniped species to go extinct since prehistoric times. This does not include hybrid species or extinct prehistoric species.

- Superfamily Otarioidea
  - Family Odobenidae
    - Genus Odobenus: 1 species
  - Family Otariidae
    - Genus Arctocephalus: 8 species
    - Genus Callorhinus: 1 species
    - Genus Eumetopias: 1 species
    - Genus Neophoca: 1 species
    - Genus Otaria: 1 species
    - Genus Phocarctos: 1 species
    - Genus Zalophus: 3 species
- Superfamily Phocoidea
  - Family Phocidae
    - Genus Cystophora: 1 species
    - Genus Erignathus: 1 species
    - Genus Halichoerus: 1 species
    - Genus Histriophoca: 1 species
    - Genus Hydrurga: 1 species
    - Genus Leptonychotes: 1 species
    - Genus Lobodon: 1 species
    - Genus Mirounga: 2 species
    - Genus Monachus: 1 species
    - Genus Neomonachus: 2 species
    - Genus Ommatophoca: 1 species
    - Genus Pagophilus: 1 species
    - Genus Phoca: 2 species
    - Genus Pusa: 3 species

- Pinnipedia
  - Odobenidae
    Odobenus
  - Otariidae
    - - - Arctocephalus
        - - Neophoca
          - Phocarctos
        - Otaria
      - - Zalophus
        - Eumetopias
    - Callorhinus
  - Phocidae
    - - - - - - Pusa
              - Phoca
            - Halichoerus
          - - Histriophoca
            - Pagophilus
        - Cystophora
      - Erignathus
    - - - - - - Leptonychotes
              - Hydrurga
            - Lobodon
          - Ommatophoca
        - Mirounga
      - - Monachus
        - Neomonachus

== Pinnipeds ==
The following classification is based on the taxonomy described by Mammal Species of the World (2005), with augmentation by generally accepted proposals made since using molecular phylogenetic analysis. This includes splitting the monk seal genus Monachus into Monachus and Neomonachus, the reorganization of grey seal subspecies, and the removal of the Laptev walrus subspecies.

=== Family Odobenidae ===
Genus Odobenus – Brisson, 1762 – one species
Common name	Scientific name and subspecies	Range	Size and ecology	IUCN status and estimated population
Walrus	O. rosmarus (Linnaeus, 1758) Two subspecies: O. r. rosmarus (Atlantic walrus); O. r. divergens (Pacific walrus)	Arctic Ocean and subarctic seas	Size: Male: 270–356 cm (106–140 in) long; 800–1,700 kg (1,764–3,748 lb); Female: 225–312 cm (89–123 in) long; 400–1,250 kg (882–2,756 lb) Habitat: Neritic marine, oceanic marine, intertidal marine, coastal marine, and other Diet: Bivalve mollusks, as well as other invertebrates, slow-moving fish, and occasionally birds, seals, and other marine mammals	VU 112,500

=== Family Otariidae ===
Genus Arctocephalus – Geoffroy, F. Cuvier, 1826 – eight species
Common name	Scientific name and subspecies	Range	Size and ecology	IUCN status and estimated population
Antarctic fur seal	A. gazella (Peters, 1875)	Subantarctic islands	Size: Male: 180 cm (71 in) long; 130–200 kg (287–441 lb); Female: 120–140 cm (47–55 in) long; 22–50 kg (49–110 lb) Habitat: Neritic marine, oceanic marine, intertidal marine, and coastal marine Diet: Krill, cephalopods, fish, and penguins	EN 944,000
Cape fur seal	A. pusillus (Schreber, 1775) Two subspecies: A. p. pusillus; A. p. doriferus	Southern African and Australian coasts (dark blue indicates breeding grounds)	Size: Male: 201–227 cm (79–89 in) long; 218–360 kg (481–794 lb); Female: 136–171 cm (54–67 in) long; 41–113 kg (90–249 lb) Habitat: Neritic marine, oceanic marine, intertidal marine, and coastal marine Diet: A wide variety of fish, cephalopods, and crustaceans, and sometimes African penguins and other seabirds	LC 1,060,000
Galápagos fur seal	A. galapagoensis Heller, 1904	Galápagos Islands	Size: Male: 150–160 cm (59–63 in) long; 60–68 kg (132–150 lb); Female: 110–130 cm (43–51 in) long; 27–33 kg (60–73 lb) Habitat: Neritic marine, oceanic marine, intertidal marine, and coastal marine Diet: Small squids and a variety of fish	EN 6,800–9,300
Guadalupe fur seal	A. townsendi Merriam, 1897	Islands off of the southern Pacific coast of North America (dark blue indicates breeding grounds)	Size: Male: 180 cm (71 in) long; 160–170 kg (353–375 lb); Female: 148 cm (58 in) long; 49 kg (108 lb) Habitat: Neritic marine, oceanic marine, intertidal marine, and coastal marine Diet: Squid, as well as fish	LC 10,000
Juan Fernández fur seal	A. philippii (Peters, 1866)	Islands off of the Pacific coast of South America	Size: Male: 150–200 cm (59–79 in) long; 140 kg (309 lb); Female: 140 cm (55 in) long; 50 kg (110 lb) Habitat: Neritic marine, oceanic marine, intertidal marine, and coastal marine Diet: Lanternfish, as well as a narrow range of fish from the Scomberesocidae, Carangidae, Engraulidae, and Bathylagidae families, and cephalopods	LC 142,000
New Zealand fur seal	A. forsteri (Lesson, 1828)	Southern Australian and New Zealand coasts	Size: Male: 150–250 cm (59–98 in) long; 120–180 kg (265–397 lb); Female: 100–150 cm (39–59 in) long; 30–50 kg (66–110 lb) Habitat: Forest, shrubland, neritic marine, oceanic marine, intertidal marine, and coastal marine Diet: A wide variety of cephalopods, fish, and birds	LC 100,000
South American fur seal	A. australis (Zimmermann, 1783) Two subspecies: A. a. australis; A. a. gracilis	Southern South American coasts	Size: Male: 200 cm (79 in) long; 90–200 kg (198–441 lb); Female: 140 cm (55 in) long; 60 kg (132 lb) Habitat: Neritic marine, oceanic marine, intertidal marine, and coastal marine Diet: Pelagic fish, demersal fish, and cephalopods	LC 109,500
Subantarctic fur seal	A. tropicalis (Gray, 1872)	Southern parts of the Indian, Pacific, and Atlantic Oceans	Size: Male: 180 cm (71 in) long; 70–165 kg (154–364 lb); Female: 119–152 cm (47–60 in) long; 25–67 kg (55–148 lb) Habitat: Neritic marine, oceanic marine, intertidal marine, and coastal marine Diet: Lanternfish, cod icefish, and cephalopods, as well as crustaceans and rockhopper penguins	LC 200,000

Genus Callorhinus – Gray, 1859 – one species
Common name	Scientific name and subspecies	Range	Size and ecology	IUCN status and estimated population
Northern fur seal	C. ursinus (Linnaeus, 1758)	Northern Pacific Ocean (dark blue indicates breeding grounds)	Size: Male: 213 cm (84 in) long; 180–275 kg (397–606 lb); Female: 142 cm (56 in) long; 40–50 kg (88–110 lb) Habitat: Neritic marine, oceanic marine, intertidal marine, and coastal marine Diet: A variety of epipelagic and vertically migrating mesopelagic fish and squid	VU 650,000

Genus Eumetopias – Gill, 1866 – one species
Common name	Scientific name and subspecies	Range	Size and ecology	IUCN status and estimated population
Steller sea lion	E. jubatus (Schreber, 1776)	Northern Pacific Ocean (red indicates breeding grounds)	Size: Male: 300–340 cm (118–134 in) long; 1,120 kg (2,469 lb); Female: 230–290 cm (91–114 in) long; 350 kg (772 lb) Habitat: Neritic marine, oceanic marine, intertidal marine, and coastal marine Diet: A variety of fish and cephalopods, as well as northern fur seal, harbor seals, and ringed seals	NT 81,300

Genus Neophoca – Gray, 1866 – one species
Common name	Scientific name and subspecies	Range	Size and ecology	IUCN status and estimated population
Australian sea lion	N. cinerea (Péron, 1816)	Southwestern Australian coast	Size: Male: 180–250 cm (71–98 in) long; 180–250 kg (397–551 lb); Female: 130–180 cm (51–71 in) long; 61–105 kg (134–231 lb) Habitat: Neritic marine, oceanic marine, intertidal marine, and coastal marine Diet: Cephalopods, fish, and crustaceans	EN 6,500

Genus Otaria – Péron, 1816 – one species
Common name	Scientific name and subspecies	Range	Size and ecology	IUCN status and estimated population
South American sea lion	O. flavescens (Shaw, 1800)	Southeastern and western South American coast and islands	Size: Male: 210–260 cm (83–102 in) long; 300–350 kg (661–772 lb); Female: 150–200 cm (59–79 in) long; 170 kg (375 lb) Habitat: Inland wetlands, neritic marine, oceanic marine, intertidal marine, and coastal marine Diet: A wide variety of benthic fish, pelagic fish, and invertebrates	LC 222,500

Genus Phocarctos – Peters, 1866 – one species
Common name	Scientific name and subspecies	Range	Size and ecology	IUCN status and estimated population
New Zealand sea lion	P. hookeri (Gray, 1844)	Southern New Zealand coast and islands	Size: Male: 210–270 cm (83–106 in) long; 300–450 kg (661–992 lb); Female: 180–200 cm (71–79 in) long; 90–165 kg (198–364 lb) Habitat: Forest, shrubland, neritic marine, oceanic marine, intertidal marine, and coastal marine Diet: A wide variety of fish, cephalopods, and crustaceans, as well as penguins	EN 3,000

Genus Zalophus – Gill, 1866 – three species
Common name	Scientific name and subspecies	Range	Size and ecology	IUCN status and estimated population
California sea lion	Z. californianus (Lesson, 1828)	Pacific North American coast (dark blue indicates breeding grounds)	Size: 165–220 cm (65–87 in) long; 275–390 kg (606–860 lb) Habitat: Neritic marine, oceanic marine, intertidal marine, and coastal marine Diet: A variety of fish and squid	LC 180,000
Galápagos sea lion	Z. wollebaeki Sivertsen, 1953	Galápagos Islands	Size: Male: 200–250 cm (79–98 in) long; 200–400 kg (441–882 lb); Female: 150–200 cm (59–79 in) long; 50–110 kg (110–243 lb) Habitat: Neritic marine, oceanic marine, intertidal marine, and coastal marine Diet: Sardines, as well as lanternfish, deep-sea smelt, and small squid	EN 11,800–16,500
Japanese sea lion†	Z. japonicus (Peters, 1866)	Sea of Japan	Size: Male: 230–250 cm (91–98 in) long; 450–560 kg (992–1,235 lb); Female: 160 cm (63 in) long Habitat: Neritic marine, oceanic marine, intertidal marine, and coastal marine Diet: Unknown; believed to be similar to California sea lions	EX 0

=== Family Phocidae ===
Genus Cystophora – Agardh, 1841 – one species
Common name	Scientific name and subspecies	Range	Size and ecology	IUCN status and estimated population
Hooded seal	C. cristata (Erxleben, 1777)	Central and western North Atlantic ocean (blue indicates breeding grounds)	Size: Male: 250–270 cm (98–106 in) long; 200–400 kg (441–882 lb); Female: 200–220 cm (79–87 in) long; 145–300 kg (320–661 lb) Habitat: Neritic marine, oceanic marine, intertidal marine, and coastal marine Diet: Fish and invertebrates throughout the water column	EN Unknown

Genus Erignathus – Gill, 1866 – one species
Common name	Scientific name and subspecies	Range	Size and ecology	IUCN status and estimated population
Bearded seal	E. barbatus (Erxleben, 1777) Two subspecies: E. b. barbatus; E. b. nautica	Arctic ocean	Size: 200–260 cm (79–102 in) long; 200–360 kg (441–794 lb) tail Habitat: Neritic marine, oceanic marine, and intertidal marine Diet: Crabs, shrimp, clams, snails, benthic and demersal fish, and spoon worms	NT Unknown

Genus Halichoerus – Nilsson, 1820 – one species
Common name	Scientific name and subspecies	Range	Size and ecology	IUCN status and estimated population
Grey seal	H. grypus (Fabricius, 1791) Two subspecies: H. g. atlantica; H. g. grypus	Shores of the North Atlantic Ocean	Size: Male: 195–230 cm (77–91 in) long; 170–310 kg (375–683 lb); Female: 165–195 cm (65–77 in) long; 105–186 kg (231–410 lb) Habitat: Neritic marine, oceanic marine, intertidal marine, and coastal marine Diet: Benthic and demersal fish	LC 313,000

Genus Histriophoca – Gill, 1873 – one species
Common name	Scientific name and subspecies	Range	Size and ecology	IUCN status and estimated population
Ribbon seal	H. fasciata (Zimmermann, 1783)	Arctic and subarctic regions of the North Pacific Ocean (blue indicates reduced summer range)	Size: 165–175 cm (65–69 in) long; 72–90 kg (159–198 lb) Habitat: Neritic marine and oceanic marine Diet: Fish, crustaceans, and other invertebrates	LC 183,000

Genus Hydrurga – Gistel, 1848 – one species
Common name	Scientific name and subspecies	Range	Size and ecology	IUCN status and estimated population
Leopard seal	H. leptonyx (Blainville, 1820)	Antarctic Ocean	Size: Male: 250–320 cm (98–126 in) long; 200–455 kg (441–1,003 lb); Female: 241–338 cm (95–133 in) long; 225–591 kg (496–1,303 lb) Habitat: Neritic marine, oceanic marine, intertidal marine, and coastal marine Diet: Krill, fish, squid, penguins, other seabirds, and juvenile seals	LC 25,000–79,000

Genus Leptonychotes – Gill, 1872 – one species
Common name	Scientific name and subspecies	Range	Size and ecology	IUCN status and estimated population
Weddell seal	L. weddellii (Lesson, 1826)	Coastal Antarctic Ocean	Size: 280–330 cm (110–130 in) long; 400–600 kg (882–1,323 lb) Habitat: Neritic marine, oceanic marine, intertidal marine, and coastal marine Diet: Cod icefish, as well as Antarctic toothfish, lanternfish, and cephalopods	LC 202,000

Genus Lobodon – Gray, 1844 – one species
Common name	Scientific name and subspecies	Range	Size and ecology	IUCN status and estimated population
Crabeater seal	L. carcinophaga (Hombron, Jacquinot, 1842)	Antarctic Ocean	Size: Male: 203–241 cm (80–95 in) long; 200–300 kg (441–661 lb); Female: 216–241 cm (85–95 in) long; 200–300 kg (441–661 lb) Habitat: Neritic marine, oceanic marine, intertidal marine, and coastal marine Diet: Antarctic krill, as well as fish and squid	LC 4,000,000

Genus Mirounga – Gray, 1827 – two species
Common name	Scientific name and subspecies	Range	Size and ecology	IUCN status and estimated population
Northern elephant seal	M. angustirostris Gill, 1866	Northeastern Pacific Ocean (red dots indicate breeding grounds)	Size: Male: 400–500 cm (157–197 in) long; 2,000–2,700 kg (4,409–5,952 lb); Female: 200–300 cm (79–118 in) long; 600–900 kg (1,323–1,984 lb) Habitat: Neritic marine, oceanic marine, intertidal marine, and coastal marine Diet: Squid, lanternfish, and other mesopelagic fish	LC 110,000
Southern elephant seal	M. leonina (Linnaeus, 1758)	Antarctic and subantarctic region	Size: Male: 450–600 cm (177–236 in) long; 1,500–3,700 kg (3,307–8,157 lb); Female: 200–300 cm (79–118 in) long; 400–600 kg (882–1,323 lb) Habitat: Neritic marine, oceanic marine, intertidal marine, and coastal marine Diet: Lanternfish, cod icefish, and squid	VU

Genus Monachus – Fleming, 1822 – one species
Common name	Scientific name and subspecies	Range	Size and ecology	IUCN status and estimated population
Mediterranean monk seal	M. monachus (Hermann, 1779)	Scattered portions of the Mediterranean Sea	Size: 230–280 cm (91–110 in) long; 240–300 kg (529–661 lb) Habitat: Neritic marine, oceanic marine, intertidal marine, and coastal marine Diet: Benthic fish, pelagic fish, cephalopods, and lobsters	VU 400–600

Genus Neomonachus – Slater, Helgen, 2014 – two species
Common name	Scientific name and subspecies	Range	Size and ecology	IUCN status and estimated population
Caribbean monk seal†	N. tropicalis (Gray, 1850)	Caribbean Sea	Size: 200–240 cm (79–94 in) long; 200 kg (441 lb) Habitat: Neritic marine, oceanic marine, intertidal marine, and coastal marine Diet: Believed to have eaten eels, lobsters, octopus, and coral reef fish	EX 0
Hawaiian monk seal	N. schauinslandi (Matschie, 1905)	Hawaiian islands	Size: 210–250 cm (83–98 in) long; 170–240 kg (375–529 lb) Habitat: Neritic marine, oceanic marine, intertidal marine, and coastal marine Diet: Benthic fish, pelagic fish, cephalopods, and lobsters	VU 900

Genus Ommatophoca – Gray, 1844 – one species
Common name	Scientific name and subspecies	Range	Size and ecology	IUCN status and estimated population
Ross seal	O. rossii Gray, 1844	Coastal Antarctic Ocean	Size: Male: 168–208 cm (66–82 in) long; 129–216 kg (284–476 lb); Female: 190–250 cm (75–98 in) long; 159–204 kg (351–450 lb) Habitat: Neritic marine, oceanic marine, and coastal marine Diet: Squid, as well as fish and krill	LC 50,000

Genus Pagophilus – Gray, 1844 – one species
Common name	Scientific name and subspecies	Range	Size and ecology	IUCN status and estimated population
Harp seal	P. groenlandicus (Erxleben, 1777) Two subspecies: P. g. groenlandicus; P. g. oceanicus	Northern Atlantic Ocean	Size: Male: 171–190 cm (67–75 in) long; 135 kg (298 lb); Female: 168–183 cm (66–72 in) long; 120 kg (265 lb) Habitat: Neritic marine, oceanic marine, intertidal marine, and coastal marine Diet: A wide variety of fish and invertebrates	NT Unknown

Genus Phoca – Linnaeus, 1758 – two species
Common name	Scientific name and subspecies	Range	Size and ecology	IUCN status and estimated population
Spotted seal	P. largha Pallas, 1811	Northern Pacific Ocean (dark areas indicate breeding grounds)	Size: Male: 161–176 cm (63–69 in) long; 85–110 kg (187–243 lb); Female: 151–169 cm (59–67 in) long; 65–115 kg (143–254 lb) Habitat: Neritic marine, oceanic marine, intertidal marine, and coastal marine Diet: A variety of fish, cephalopods, and crustaceans	LC 320,000
Harbor seal	P. vitulina Linnaeus, 1758 Five subspecies: P. v. concolor (Western Atlantic common seal); P. v. mellonae (Ungava seal); P. v. richardii (Pacific common seal); P. v. stejnegeri (Insular seal); P. v. vitulina (Eastern Atlantic common seal)	Northern Hemisphere coastlines	Size: Male: 160–186 cm (63–73 in) long; 87–170 kg (192–375 lb); Female: 148–169 cm (58–67 in) long; 60–142 kg (132–313 lb) Habitat: Neritic marine, oceanic marine, intertidal marine, and coastal marine Diet: A wide variety of fish, cephalopods, and crustaceans	LC 315,000

Genus Pusa – Scopoli, 1771 – three species
Common name	Scientific name and subspecies	Range	Size and ecology	IUCN status and estimated population
Baikal seal	P. sibirica Gmelin, 1788	Lake Baikal	Size: 110–140 cm (43–55 in) long; 50–130 kg (110–287 lb) Habitat: Inland wetlands Diet: Sculpin fish, as well as other fish	LC 54,000
Caspian seal	P. caspica Gmelin, 1788	Caspian Sea	Size: 126–140 cm (50–55 in) long; 50–86 kg (110–190 lb) Habitat: Inland wetlands Diet: A variety of fish	EN 68,000
Ringed seal	P. hispida Schreber, 1775 Five subspecies: P. h. botnica (Baltic ringed seal); P. h. hispida (Arctic ringed seal); P. h. ladogensis (Ladoga ringed seal); P. h. ochotensis (Okhotsk ringed seal); P. h. saimensis (Saimaa ringed seal)	Arctic Ocean	Size: 110–175 cm (43–69 in) long; 32–124 kg (71–273 lb) Habitat: Inland wetlands, neritic marine, and oceanic marine Diet: A variety of invertebrates and small fish	LC 1,500,000
