= Freshwater seal =

Seal species which live primarily in freshwater lakes

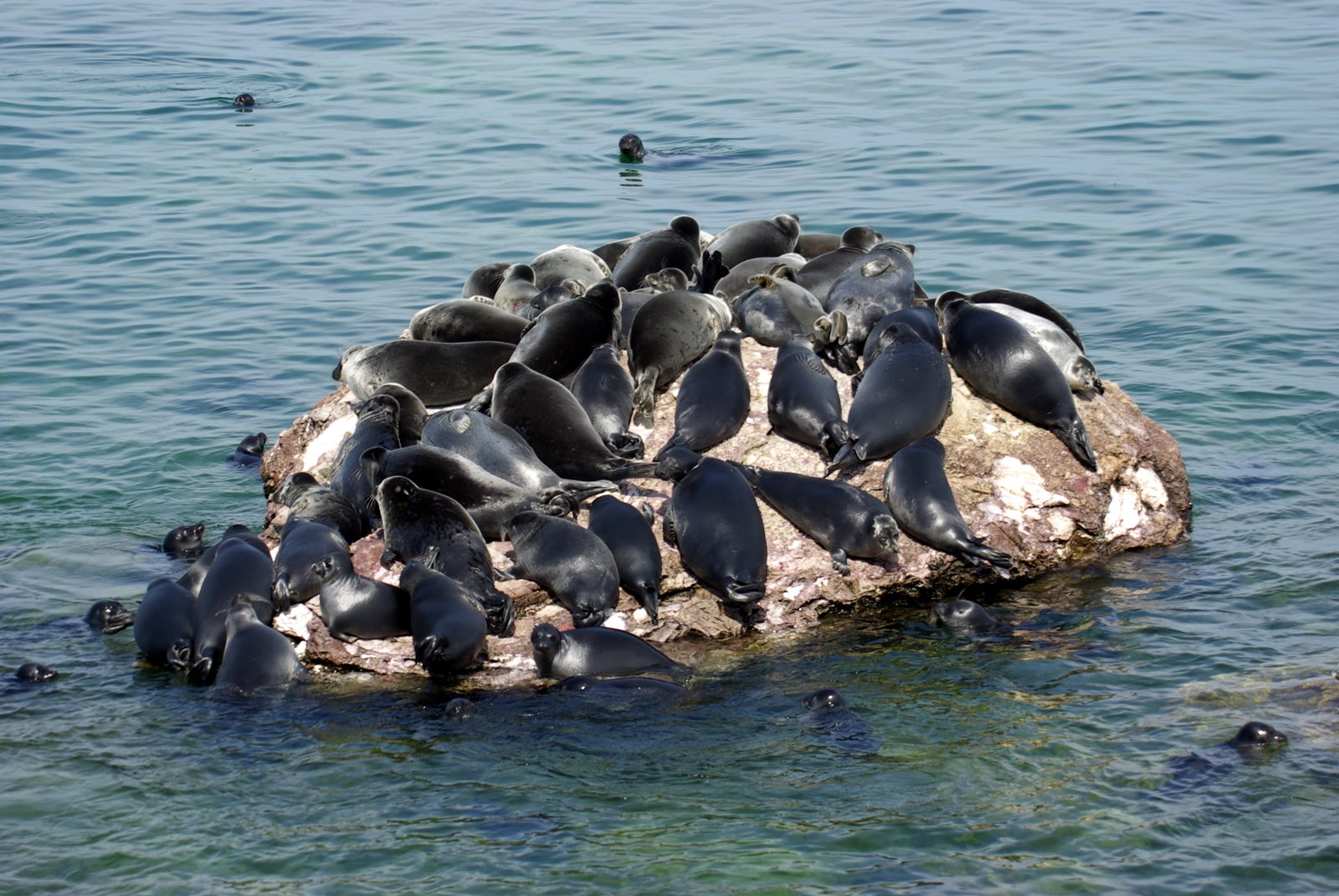
Baikal Seals resting on a rock outcrop in Lake Baikal

Freshwater seals are pinnipeds which live in freshwater bodies. The group is paraphyletic in nature, the uniting factor being the environment in which these pinnipeds live. The vast majority of all modern seals live solely in saltwater habitats though this is likely due to the rarity of sufficiently large freshwater bodies rather than a limitation of seal biology. Many species of typically saltwater seals may occasionally frequent freshwater environments or include isolated populations in near coastal freshwater lakes. Additionally, a few species and subspecies are exclusively confined to freshwater bodies.

== Baikal seals ==
The Baikal seal is an exclusively freshwater seal species which is locally called nerpa (нерпа). It has inhabited Lake Baikal for roughly two million years, the closest relative to it being the Arctic ringed seal whence it has likely descended. The manner by which the baikal seal reached Lake Baikal is still not fully understood, theories include their entrance into the lake via travel up the Yenisei River or perhaps via large lakes which existed in Siberia during the Pleistocene.

== Ladoga ringed seals ==
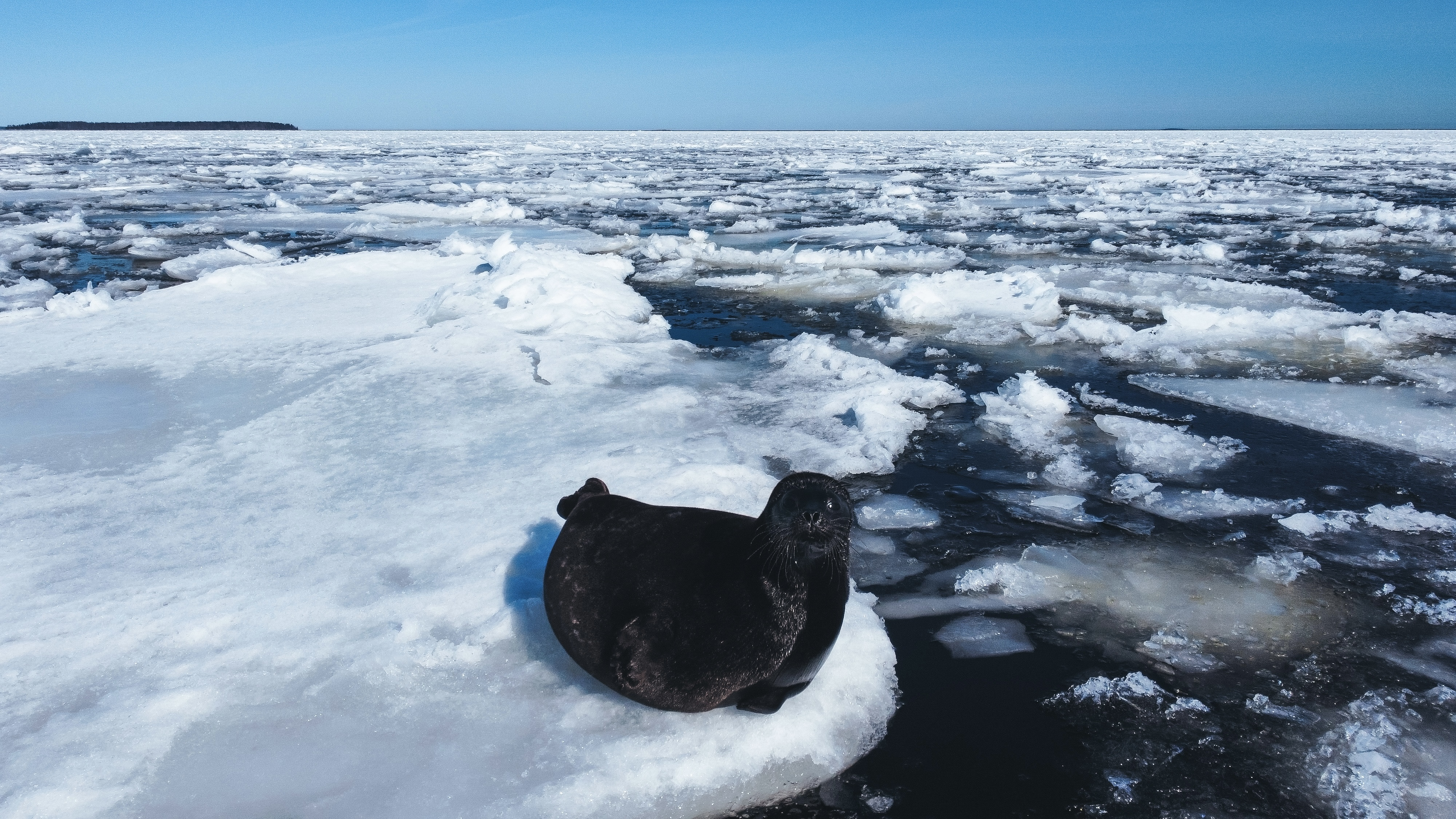
A Ladoga seal lying on ice in Lake Ladoga

One subspecies of ringed seal lives solely in freshwater lakes. The Ladoga seal inhabits Lake Ladoga in the Leningrad Oblast and Republic of Karelia. The seals became isolated in Lake Ladoga from the Baltic ringed seal (Pusa hispida botnica) as early as 8,800 BP due to the gradual isostatic rebound of the region following the end of the Weichselian Glaciation. Modern populations of the Ladoga seal only stand at around 2,000 to 3,000 individuals, a significant decline from the estimated 20,000 seals which inhabited Lake Ladoga before hunting decreased the population.

== Saimaa ringed seals ==
The Saimaa ringed seal is a species of seal unique to Saimaa, a large freshwater lake in the regions of South Savo, South Karelia, and North Karelia in Finland. Current estimates place the size of the population at between 420 and 430 individuals, an increase from the roughly 100 to 150 individuals present in 1983. The Saimaa ringed seal was long thought to be a subspecies of ringed seal closely related to the Ladoga ringed seal. Under this notion, the population was thought to have become isolated from the Baltic ringed seal around the same time as the Ladoga ringed seal. However, a 2025 study indicated that the Saimaa ringed seal is of different origin. According to the study, while the Lake Ladoga ringed seal originated from the Baltic ringed seal, Saimaa ringed seals have a more ancient origin than other ringed seals. The seals spread into Finnish territory from an isolated population in glacial lakes to the East or South of the Fennoscandian ice sheet during the late Pleistocene. The study established the Saimaa ringed seal as a unique species of Pusa, and found a genetic isolation from other ringed seals of at least 60,000 years. The seals have inhabited Saimaa for around 10,000 years since the lake's formation at the beginning of the Holocene. Between 10,000 and 8,000 years ago limited gene-flow occurred between the Saimaa ringed seals and the Baltic ringed seals.

== Harbor seals ==
Harbor seals (common seals) are also known to enter estuaries and freshwater rivers in pursuit of their prey. In addition a unique subspecies in Quebec and an isolated population of harbor seals in Alaska are known to inhabit freshwater lakes for the duration of the year. The Ungava seal (Phoca vitulina mellonae) is a subspecies of the harbor seal which lives solely within the landlocked and fresh water environment of Lacs des Loups Marins, Petit Lac de Loups Marins, and Lac Bourdel in northern Quebec. This subspecies of harbor seal is currently listed as endangered by the IUCN due to the current population being as low as only 100 to 300 individuals.

Iliamna Lake as seen by the Sentinel-2 Earth observation satellite

Another freshwater isolated population of harbor seals exists in Iliamna Lake, Alaska. These seals represent an isolated population of the Pacific Harbor Seal (Phoca vitulina richardsi), the survival of this population is due to the existence of a number of islands within the lake for the seals to pup on, away from potential predators on the shoreline of the lake. The diet of these seals is primarily composed of Salmonids in the summer with the diet of these seals remaining obscure throughout the remainder of the year. This population has been recorded at around 400 individuals, though following particularly harsh winters in the 1970s, the population is thought to have dropped to as low as only 50 individuals. The harbor seals of Iliamna Lake were first noted in historic records in the 1800s, thus they have been present there for a minimum of 200 years. The oldest possible date for their arrival in the lake is thought to be approximately 5,000 BP, prior to this the lake would have been less accessible due to the outflowing river flowing steeply down a glacial moraine. Any date older than between 12,600 and 16,000 BP can be entirely precluded because of the existence of glacial ice where the lake now exists.

== Sea lions ==
California sea lions and Steller sea lions can also live in fresh water for extended periods of time, such as near the Bonneville Dam, nearly 240 kilometres (150 mi) up the Columbia River and at the bottom of the Willamette Falls on the Willamette River. In 2004, a healthy sea lion was found sitting on a road in Merced County, California, almost a hundred miles upstream from the San Francisco Bay and half a mile from the San Joaquin River.
