= Baikal Museum =

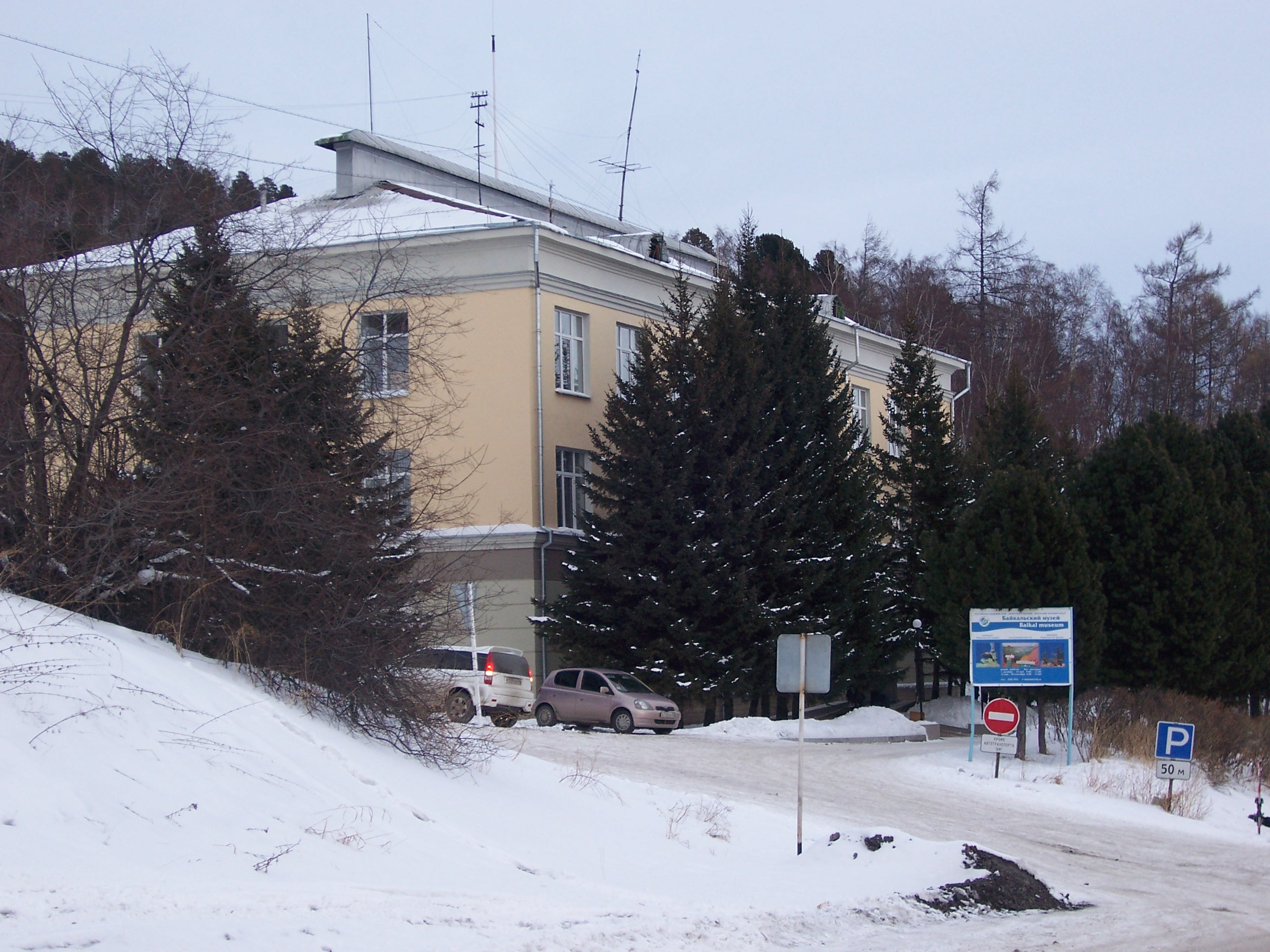
- Limnological Institute (2009)
- Established: 1993
- Location: Listvyanka, Russia
- Type: Natural history museum
- Visitors: approx. 150,000
- Director: Vladimir Abramowitsch Fialkov
- Owner: Russian Academy of Sciences
- Website: bm.isc.irk.ru

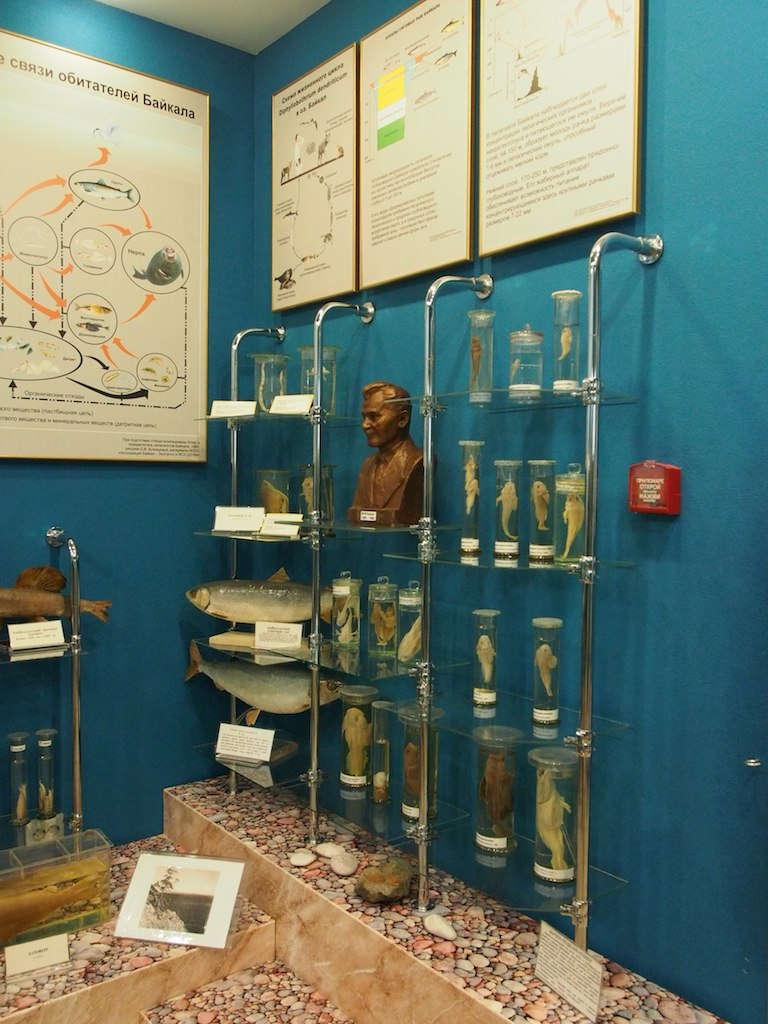
exhibition room (2013)

The Baikal Museum (Russian: Байкальский музей), or Baikal Museum at the Irkutsk Scientific Center of the Siberian Branch of the Russian Academy of Sciences, is a public natural history museum located in Listvyanka, approximately 70 kilometers southeast of Irkutsk, Russia. The museum is dedicated to Lake Baikal and its flora and fauna from scientific perspectives. An arboretum adjacent to the building displays approximately 400 plant species, some of which are rare or endangered.

== History ==
=== Project ===
In 1961, the limnological station was elevated to the status of the Institute of Limnology of the Union of Soviet Socialist Republics (USSR).

=== First Museum ===
Exclusively dedicated to the study of the lake's history and its plant and animal life, the institute became a museum in 1993. The Baikal Museum is one of the few in the region that explains the creation and topography of the lake in which 3,000 endemic species are referenced.
