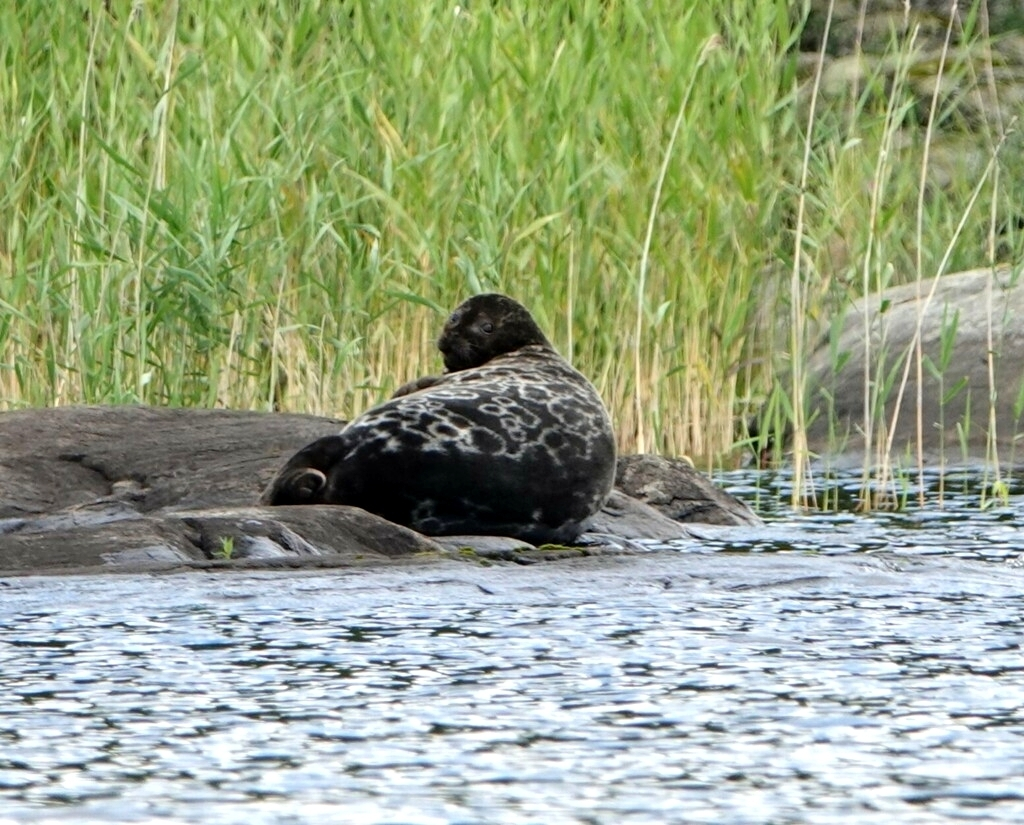
- Saimaa ringed seal pictured in 2023

Conservation status
- Endangered (IUCN 3.1)

Scientific classification
- Kingdom: Animalia
- Phylum: Chordata
- Class: Mammalia
- Order: Carnivora
- Parvorder: Pinnipedia
- Family: Phocidae
- Genus: Pusa
- Species: P. saimensis

Binomial name
- Pusa saimensis (Nordquist, 1899)
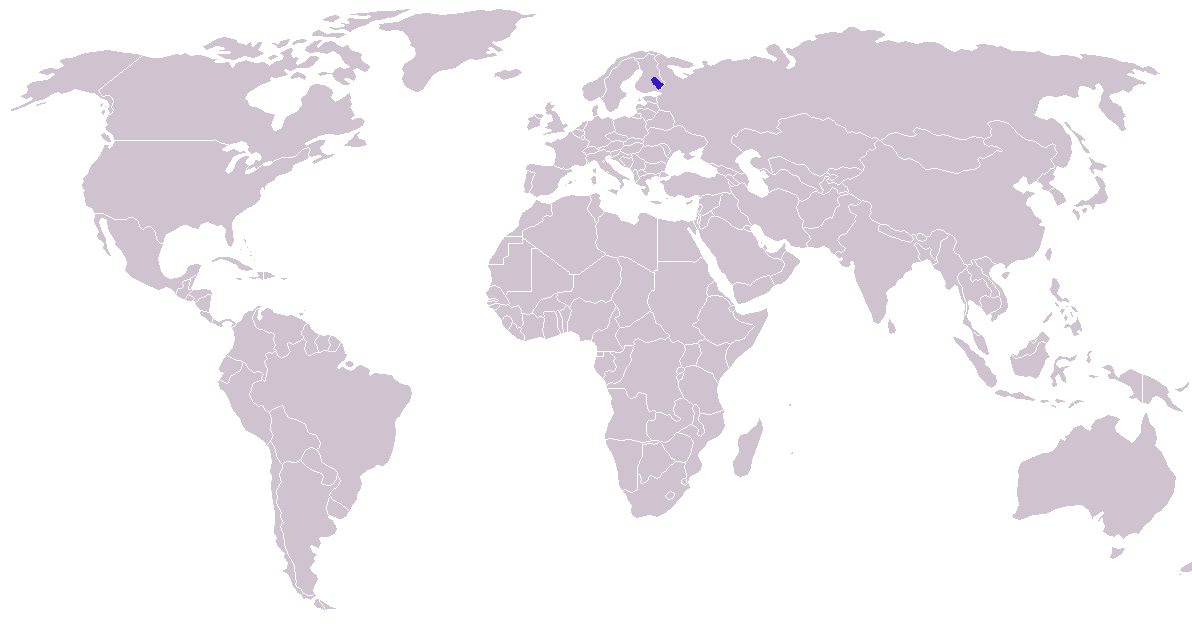

= Saimaa ringed seal =

Freshwater seal found in Finland

The Saimaa ringed seal (Pusa saimensis, Finnish: saimaannorppa, Swedish: saimenvikare) is a species of seal. It is among the most endangered seals in the world, having a total population of only about 500 individuals. The only existing population of these seals is found in Lake Saimaa, Finland. It has lived in complete isolation from other ringed seal populations for around 9,500 years, and have diverged into a morphologically and ecologically different species or subspecies. The population is descended from ringed seals that were separated from the rest when the land rose after the last ice age. This seal, along with the Baikal seal, the Ladoga seal, and the Ungava seal, is one of the few living freshwater seals.

The Saimaa ringed seal was previously considered a subspecies of ringed seal called Pusa hispida saimensis, but in 2025 was classified as its own species after genetic research revealed its closest living relatives being ringed seals from arctic North America, rather than Baltic and Ladogan ringed seals as was previously thought, and having diverged as far back as 60,000 years ago to form its own evolutionary branch.

== Distribution ==
=== Habitat ===
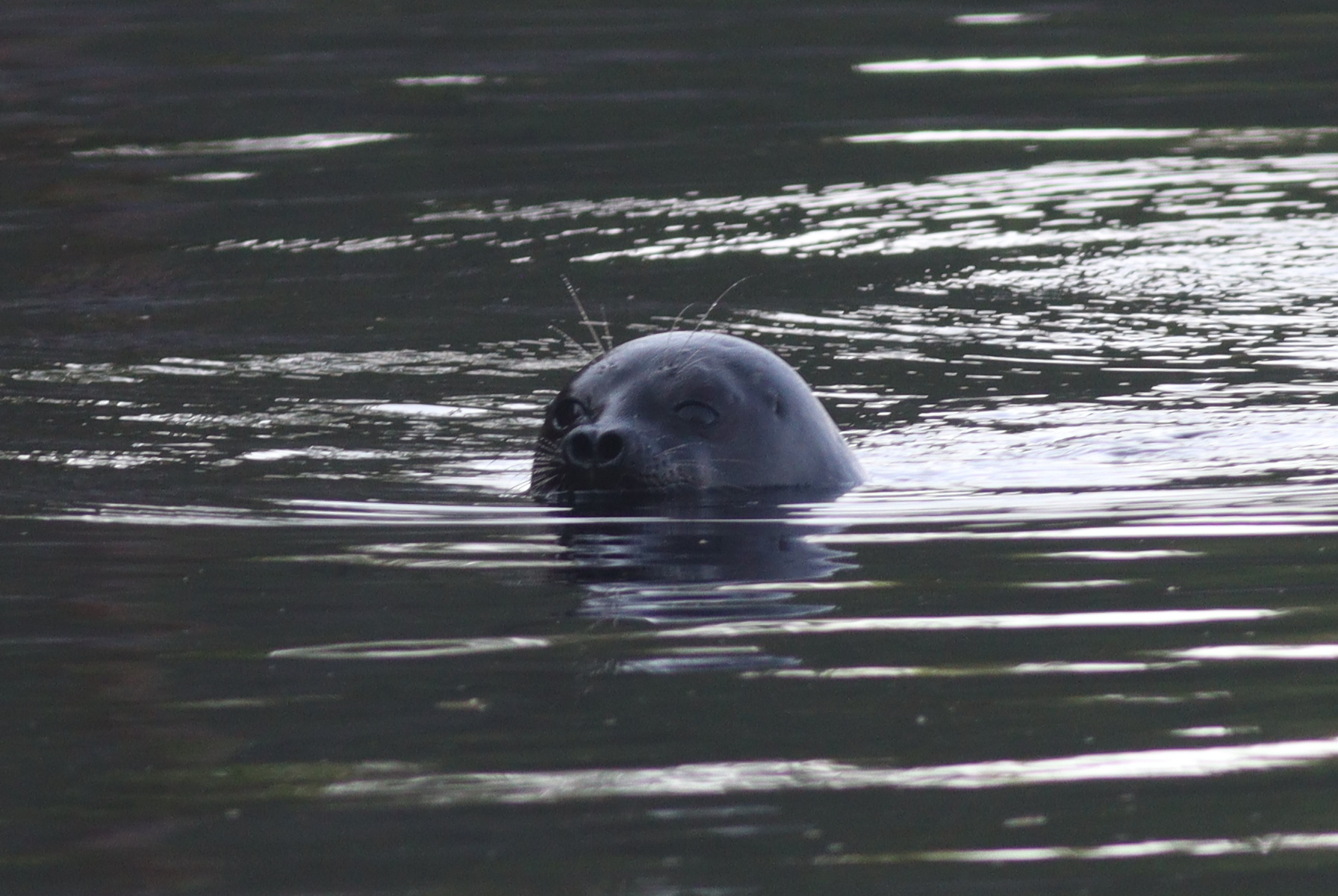
The Saimaa ringed seal swimming in Rantasalmi in September 2024

The Saimaa ringed seal is endemic to their habitat in Lake Saimaa, Finland. The lake lies between the cities of Lappeenranta in the south and Joensuu in the north, spanning an oval of approximately 180 by 140 km (112 by 87 mi). It consists of numerous larger basins connected by narrower glacier-carved channels, and its geography is maze-like, having 13,710 islands, an approximate coastline length of 14,850 kilometres (9,230 mi), and a surface area of 4,279 km^{2} (1,652 mi^{2}). It is relatively shallow, having an average depth of 17 metres (56 ft) and a maximum depth of 85.8 m (281 ft). The freshwater lake freezes over between the months of November and May, leaving the seals both an ice habitat and an open water habitat. During summer months when the ice is melted, these islands provide ample space for the seals for moulting and breeding.

=== Range ===
Saimaa ringed seals are named as such due to their only habitat being Lake Saimaa, Finland. Thus, their range is restricted only to the waters of Lake Saimaa and its surrounding banks.

== Appearance ==
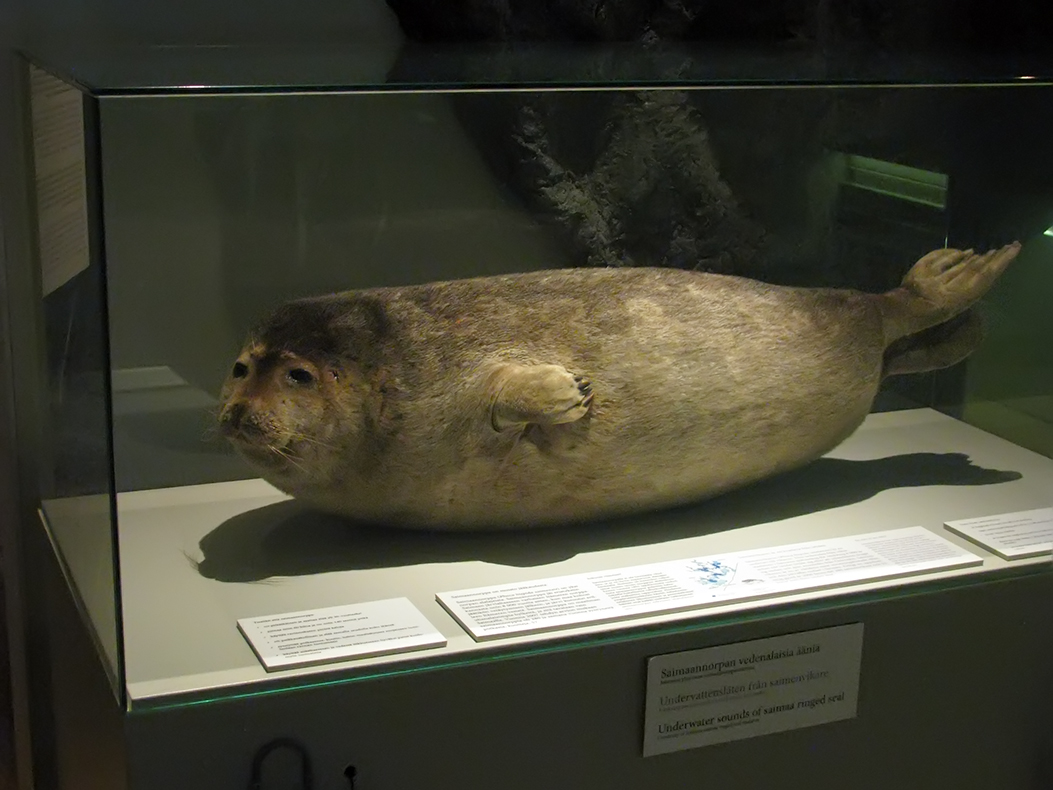
A stuffed Saimaa ringed seal at the Finnish Museum of Natural History.

An adult Saimaa ringed seal is between 85 and 160 centimetres (2.79 and 5.25 ft) in length and weighs between 50 and 90 kilograms (110 and 200 lb), males usually being larger than females. They are dark grey, with a grey-black dorsal with circular white rings. The bottom of the seal is light grey. The Saimaa ringed seal is darker than any other ringed seal.

== Diet ==
The Saimaa ringed seal does not have an incredibly varied diet. They are generalist feeders and exclusively eat fish. The fish consumed consist primarily of small schooling fish averaging 8.6 cm in length and up to 21 cm in length, while it has been shown that the pups eat slightly smaller fish than the average. The majority of their diet consists of vendace, smelt, perch, and roach. The pups' diet varies markedly from the adults' in that their diet consists primarily of perch and roach found in the shallow water where they spend most of their time in their earlier months, while the adults consume more vendace and smelt.

It was believed for a long time that the Saimaa ringed seal was competing with the commercial and recreational fishing industries and there were bounties paid on them until the 1940s. However, it has recently been proven that the Saimaa ringed seal has minimal to no effect on the fishing industry. They do not prey on the local endangered salmon species (Salmo salar, S. trutta lacustris, and Salvelinus alpinus). Although they do prey on the valuable vendace population, the proportion of the vendace population to the amount consumed by the seals indicates that they do not compete with the local fishing industries.

== Behaviour ==
=== Reproduction ===
Saimaa ringed seals become mature between the ages of 4 and 6 years. Their pregnancy rate is between 80 and 95 percent. Their gestation lasts 11 months. Their pups are between 55 and 65 centimetres (1.80 and 2.13 ft), and 4 to 5 kilograms (8.8 to 11.0 lb) at birth. The Saimaa ringed seal's longevity is just over 20 years.

A study conducted from 1980–84 revealed that Saimaa ringed seals make burrowed dens close to the shore and they reproduce once a year due to their longevity.

Saimaa ringed seals have two kinds of lairs or dens; they have a haul-out lair where no breeding takes place, and the breeding lair. Breeding lairs are located closer to the shore than haul-out dens.

=== Diving ===
Diving is an important behaviour for aquatic mammals as it is something they rely on for behaviours such as foraging and travelling. The duration of their dives increases from spring to autumn, which may be a result of food availability, but it is interesting because they are one of the few landlocked seal species. Many studies have been done to observe Saimaa ringed seal diving, which was discovered to last longer than expected. Their average time for a long dive was recorded at 15 minutes and it was believed to be an aerobic resting dive.

The average dive depth ranges from 10 to 15 m; however, their maximum dive depths were limited by environmental depth. The Saimaa ringed seal has also been observed to have seasonal hauling-out patterns. In May and June, when the seals are moulting, they are observed to haul out both day and night; however, in late summer they are observed to haul out only at night.

The Saimaa ringed seal is able to complete its dives and navigate in its environment due to its highly developed vibrissae, also known as whiskers. Using their vibrissae, they are able to detect sound and pressure waves in their otherwise dark environment.

== Conservation ==
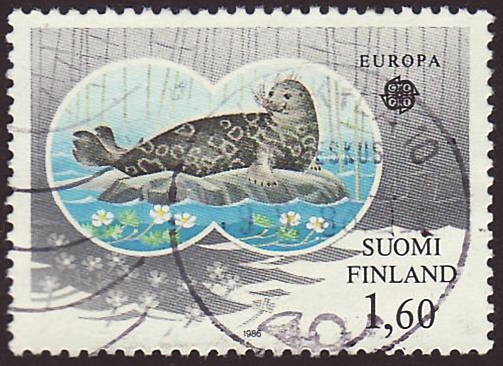
1986 Finnish commemorative stamp designed by Pirkko Vahtero to the issue "EUROPA 1986 - Nature Conservation"; drawing with a Saimaa ringed seal in binocular view

The Saimaa ringed seal has been protected by law in Finland since 1955; it is also listed as endangered by the United States government under the Endangered Species Act.

The threatened extinction of the Saimaa ringed seal was long the focus of a major publicity campaign by the Finnish Association for Nature Conservation, and a poster depicting the seal has become a Finnish icon of nature conservation in general.

In 1983, the population was between 100 and 150 seals. In 2005, it was about 270, but as a result of two unfavourable breeding seasons, 2006 and 2007, the number dropped down to 260. In 2013, the population was estimated at just over 300 and the population numbers were slowly growing. The number of breeding-aged females was 87. It was thought that the immediate threat of extinction would be alleviated if the population grew to over 400 individuals.

In spring 2016, 79 pups were found, four of which were dead.

In order to protect the Saimaa ringed seal, there are voluntary fisheries restrictions in a part of their living areas. The most important form of restriction is a ban on fishing nets from April 15 till the end of June in about 15% of the lake; nearly all fishing is recreational. Bycatch mortality has, however, remained high with estimated mortality of 20–30 seals annually, most of them pups of the same year.

In 2010 the European Union required Finland to do more to protect the seals, particularly from net fishing. To reduce the by-catch mortality of seals aged over one year, the use of certain fishing methods has been banned since 2011, which included strong mesh nets, large fish traps, and fish-baited hooks, in the main part of the Saimaa ringed seal's habitat.

In 2016, one Act and Mutual Agreement between authorities and owners of fishing waters replaced two earlier acts. The fishing co-operatives get 1.7 euros per hectare to ensure that fishing limitations are followed. Net fishing (except of vendace nets) is forbidden between mid-April and end of June in certain areas, which have been drawn at a 5 km radius from nesting sites.

Breeding success of Saimaa ringed seals depends on sufficient ice and snow cover. The loss of snow and ice caused by ongoing climate change poses a direct threat to them. Human-made snowdrifts have proved to be successful in improving seals' breeding success during winters with poor snow conditions. Snowdrifts were tested for three winters, and from 2014, they have been used regularly. In addition, artificial lairs are also in development for winters when there is no snow on the ice due to climate change. Conservation experts expect to produce 100 of these boxes for dispersal and maintenance by the local citizenry.

Recent estimates place the current population at around 500 individuals.

The Saimaa ringed seal lives mainly in two Finnish national parks, Kolovesi and Linnansaari. Strays have been seen in a much larger area, including Savonlinna centre.

== Norppalive ==
Norppalive (literally "Ringed Seal Live") is a live webcast of the Saimaa ringed seal produced by WWF. It shows a live image of a place that is occasionally visited by a Saimaa ringed seal. The purpose of Norppalive is to raise awareness of the Saimaa ringed seal. In 2016, Norppalive had up to 180,000 simultaneous viewers and a total of more than two million viewers. One of the most well-known ringed seals found in live broadcasts is Pullervo, who has become Finland's most famous Saimaa ringed seal.

== See also ==
- Ladoga ringed seal
- Baikal seal
