= West Siberian Glacial Lake =

Periglacial lake of the Weichselian Glaciation

Ice Age lakes of Siberia and Central Asia

The West Siberian Glacial Lake, also known as West Siberian Lake (Russian: Западно-Сибирское море) or Mansiyskoe Lake (Russian: Мансийское озеро, Mansi Lake), was a periglacial lake formed when the Arctic Ocean outlets for each of the Ob and Yenisei rivers were blocked by the Barents-Kara Ice Sheet during the Weichselian Glaciation, approximately 80,000 years ago. It was situated on the West Siberian Plain, and at its maximum extent the lake's surface area was more than 750,000 km^{2} which is more than twice that of the present-day Caspian Sea.

It is theorized that because drainage to the Arctic Ocean basin (e.g. by the Ob and Yenisei Rivers) was prevented, the lake would eventually overflow to the Mediterranean Sea through a circuitous route that would include the Aral Sea, the Caspian Sea, and the Black Sea. This would have resulted in water from the Selenga River and Lake Baikal draining over a course of some 9,700 kilometres (6,000 mi), considerably longer than any river's course today.

Data
Date	Elevation	Area	Volume	Average depth
90–80 ka	60 m	610000 km^{2}	15000 km^{3}	24 m
60–50 ka	45 m	881000 km^{2}	32000 km^{3}	36 m

See Mangerud et al. (2004) for diagrams and descriptions of the lake as well as postulated drainage patterns.

== See also ==
- the Baikal seal, a freshwater seal of Lake Baikal probably related to Caspian seals.
- the Turgai Sea or West Siberian Sea, a Cretaceous to Eocene extension of the Tethys Sea separating Europe and Asia
- Paratethys
