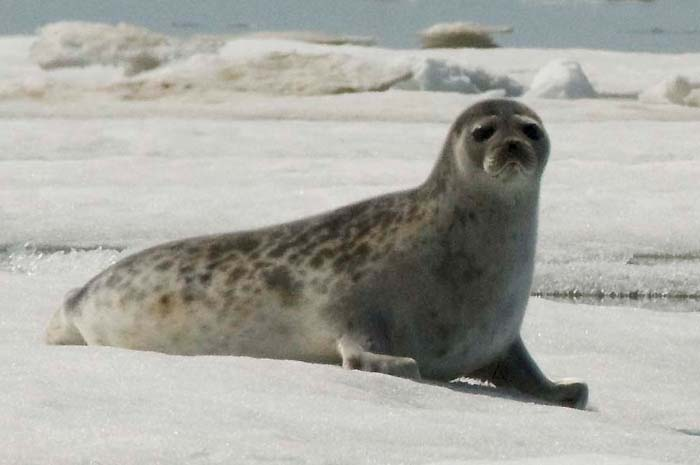

Conservation status
- Least Concern (IUCN 3.1)

- Threatened (ESA)

Scientific classification
- Kingdom: Animalia
- Phylum: Chordata
- Class: Mammalia
- Order: Carnivora
- Parvorder: Pinnipedia
- Family: Phocidae
- Genus: Pusa
- Species: P. hispida
- Subspecies: P. h. hispida

Trinomial name
- Pusa hispida hispida (Schreber, 1775)

= Arctic ringed seal =

Subspecies of carnivore

The Arctic ringed seal (Pusa hispida hispida) is a subspecies of ringed seals (Pusa hispida). Arctic ringed seals inhabit the Arctic Ocean, and are the most abundant and wide-ranging seal in the Northern Hemisphere. The ringed seal species is the smallest true seal, and gets its name from a distinctive patterning of light spots on dark grey colored fur. The ringed seal is commonly preyed upon by Polar bears, Arctic foxes, and Killer whales. Population estimates and survival rates are unknown, but average life expectancy is 15-28 years. Ringed seals have long been a component of the diet of indigenous people of the Arctic. Arctic ringed seals have been listed as threatened on the Endangered Species Act since 2012, and increasingly face loss of their habitat due to shrinking ice and snow cover.

== Physical characteristics ==
The Arctic ringed seal shares a striking similarity with other species of ringed seals. It is characterized by a small head, a snout that resembles a cat's with whiskers, and a sturdy, elongated body. Its coat is typically dark with a silver-colored belly, marked by silver rings along its back and sides. This feature is what gives it the common name 'ringed seal'. They have strong claws on their fore flippers, which they use to pierce ice to create breathing holes. Depending on subspecies and sex, adult seals can vary in size, measuring from 100 to 175 cm (39.5 to 69 in) and weighing from 30 to 140 kg (70 to 310 lb). The seal averages about 5 ft (1.5 m) long. This species is the smallest species in the true seal family.

== Taxonomy and phylogeny ==
Ringed seals are members of the Phocidae family. Researchers propose that the Phocidae family diverged from Pinnipeds, a monophyletic group of aquatic carnivores. Pinnipeds diverged from their terrestrial relatives around 40 million years ago. Pinnipeds originated in the Arctic, and diverged 20-25 million years ago into three families: Phocidae (true seals), Otariidae (sea lions), and Odobenidae (walruses). Members of the Phocidae group, which include ringed, Baikal, and Caspian seals, have adapted to breeding on sea ice. Molecular, biogeographic, and morphological approaches to classification of Pusa hispida remain incomplete.

The Arctic ringed seal, Pusa hispida hispida, is one of 5 recognized ringed seal subspecies. There have been up to 10 proposed subspecies, but current data only supports 5. The other four subspecies are found in the Sea of Okhotsk (Pusa hispida ochotensis), the Baltic Sea (Pusa hispida botnica), Lake Ladoga in Russia (Pusa hispida ladogensis), and Lake Saimaa in Finland (Pusa hispida saimensis). Ringed seals were geographically isolated from each other during the Last Glacial Maximum, during which land bridges and thick sea ice separate populations and pushed some populations southward. This expanded the range of ringed seals and created subspecies, which are discrete breeding populations. There is low genetic differentiation between species. There is some thought that Pusa h. hispida, the Arctic subspecies, may include multiple different subpopulations. More research into the Arctic population structure is needed to confirm.

== Distribution and abundance ==
Arctic ringed seals exhibit circumpolar distribution around the Northern Hemisphere. They have historically been found in most seasonally ice covered seas. The Arctic ringed seal is the most abundant out of all the ringed seal subspecies. Their distribution is divided into five regions. These regions are the Greenland Sea and Baffin Bay, Hudson Bay, Beaufort Sea, Chukchi Sea, and the White, Barents and Kara Seas. These regions do not reflect their full distribution since estimates of Arctic ringed seal populations are not available in certain areas. It can be difficult to accurately assess ringed seals' abundance, due to difficulty in tracking their trends in movement. This is due to the remoteness of their habitat, time spent below ice, and their wide range of seasonal movements. Population estimates in the five regions have not been conducted since the late 1900s for most regions. Based on aerial surveys in 2007-2008, the Hudson Bay ringed seal population estimate is 53,346 seals. Based on available data for study areas within the Beaufort and Chukchi Seas, scientists estimate that there are about 1 million seals in this region.

There is no evidence that Arctic ringed seals were historically distributed in other regions. Various studies were conducted in the 1900s to determine population sizes. In 1979, the Greenland Sea and Baffin Bay region was estimated to have 787,000 seals. The population estimate for seals is about 220,000 seals in the White, Barents, Kara, and East Siberian Seas. This data was compiled in the late 1900s.

Note: There is no available range map for the Arctic ringed seal subspecies. See ringed seal wikipedia page for range map of entire species.

== Habitat and seasonal behavior ==
Arctic ringed seals are uniquely adapted to live on ice, and the seasonality of ice cover strongly influences ringed seal behaviors. Specifically, ice cover affects their movements, foraging, reproductive behavior, and vulnerability to predation. As water freezes in the late fall, ringed seals surface to breathe in the remaining open water. Once the ice becomes too thick, they create breathing holes by scraping the ice with their claws. The breathing holes can be maintained in ice 2 m or greater in thickness. They form subnivean lairs over the breathing holes, which are used mainly for pupping, and nursing young. As snow builds up around them, the seals breathe through the holes. According to tracking records, Arctic ringed seals breeding exhibits inter-annual fidelity to breeding sites. That is, they have a tendency to return to breeding sites that were previously used. These snow caves serve as refuge from low temperatures. These low temperatures can be dangerous to pups, and the lairs also hide the seals from predators.

As temperatures warm, ringed seals transition to laying on the surface of the ice near breathing holes. The number of seals on the surface of the ice starts to increase during spring as the snow melts. Ringed seals are usually solitary, however they may gather in groups around breathing holes during the molting season each spring. Throughout most of its range, seals use ice as a location for resting, pupping, and molting.

Currently there is no specified critical habitat for the ringed seal. There is a proposed map for the critical habitat as of March 2019. The Endangered Species Act requires designation of a critical habitat for species within one year of listing. Various wildlife groups, including the Center for Biological Diversity, have taken legal action against the National Marine Fisheries Service for failing to designate a critical habitat for Ringed Seals.

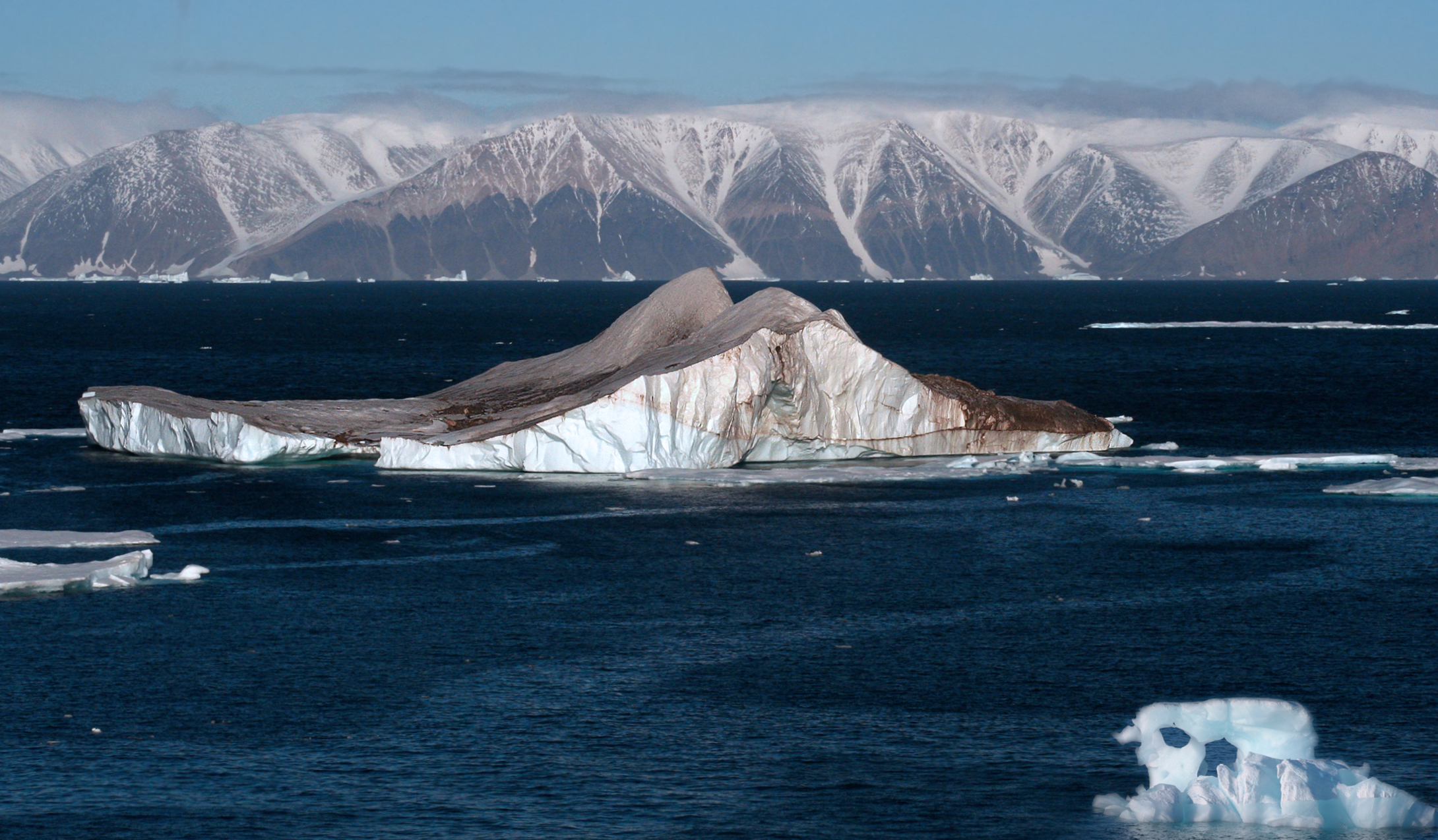

== Ecology and behavior ==
=== Reproduction and life history ===
Male ringed Seals reach sexual maturity as late as 7 years old. For females, sexual maturity can be as late as 9 years, but it can be as early as 3 years for both sexes. Ringed seals breed annually, but the timing varies based on the region. Though the timing varies with latitude, pupping usually occurs in late March through April in the Arctic. Much is unknown about the breeding system, but it is thought to be polygynous. Mating occurs while females are still nursing their pups, and mating is believed to happen near birth lairs. Males are reported to have territorial tendencies during the breeding season, producing a strong, gasoline-like scent to mark their breathing holes and lairs. After a 9 month gestation period, female seals give birth to a single pup. At birth they pups are approximately 60-65 cm in length and weigh 4.5-5.0 kg. The pups are born with a white natal coat of blubber, known as the “lanugo,” that provides insulation until it sheds after 4-6 weeks. The pups nurse for as long as 2 months in stable shorefast ice, but for as little as 3-6 weeks in moving ice. During nursing, Arctic ringed seals spend about 50% of their time in the water, and practice developing deep diving skills. Pups are normally weaned before the spring ice breaks up, and pups are four times their birth weights at weaning. Ringed seals live about 25-30 years, and are solitary with territorial tendencies for most of their lives besides breeding.

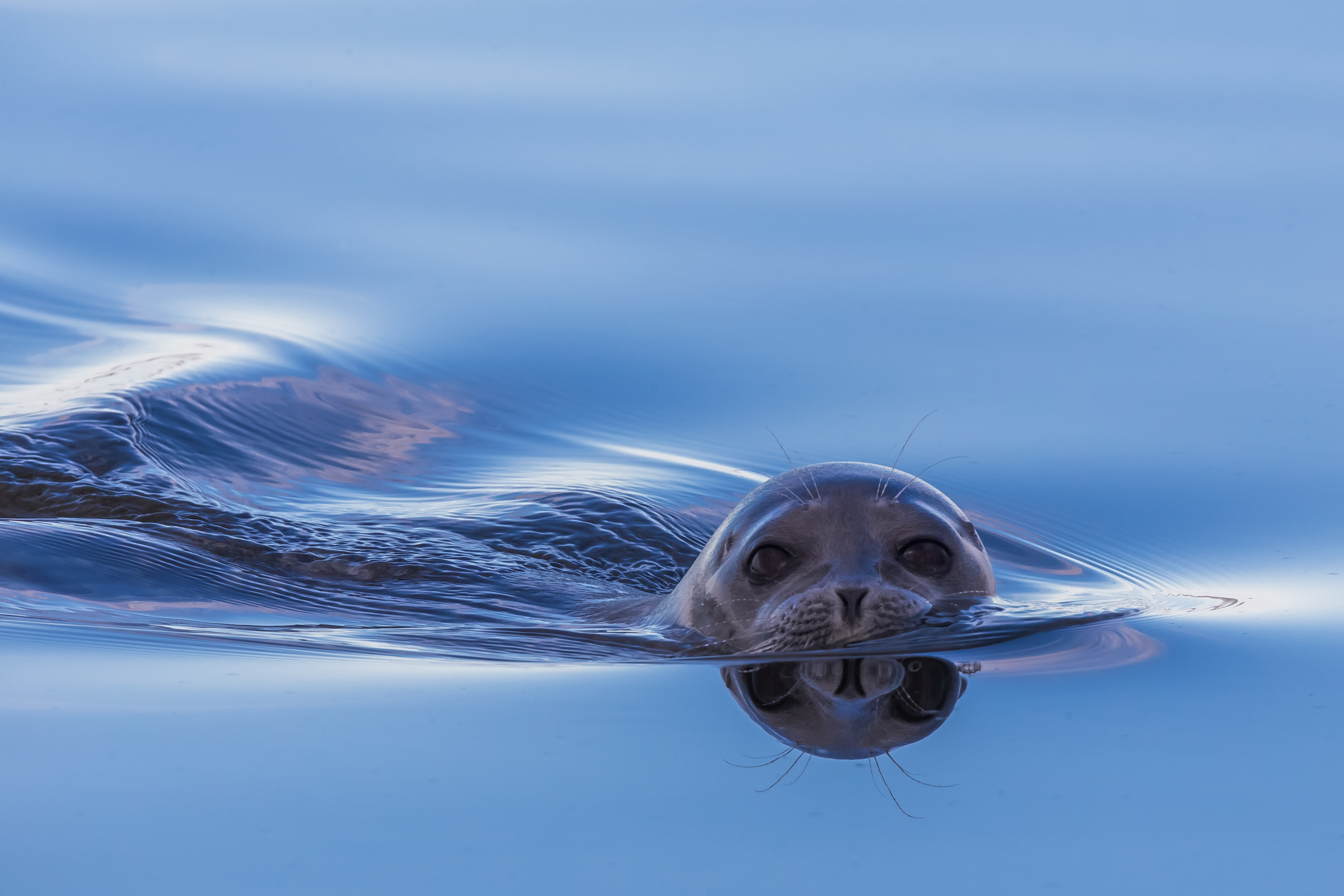

=== Diet ===
Ringed seals eat a wide variety of small prey that span several trophic levels. Scientists have some disagreement over their exact diet. Analysis reveals their diet varies depending on a variety of factors, such as location, season, life stage, and sex. Research suggests a latitudinal gradient as well. Arctic cod is most often reported as the primary prey species. Herring, redfish, snailfish, sand lance, and Atlantic salmon are also common prey items. Mating and molting occur in the spring, during which shrimp and invertebrates become more important to the diet. During summer and fall, seals feed on prey such as sand lance during the open water season, to prepare fat reserves for the winter. In the fall, prey from the cod family tend to make a higher percentage of the seal’s diet from late fall through spring. If females don't get adequate blubber reserves from feeding, they will suppress ovulation for that year. This ensures they always have enough energy reserves needed for reproduction. Feeding is usually a solitary behavior, during which they may dive to depths of 35 to 150 feet and stay submerged for up to 39 minutes. The mechanism of food consumption is unclear. Some studies report that seals eat small fish by swallowing them whole, while others suggest that seals filter food with their teeth.

=== Predation ===
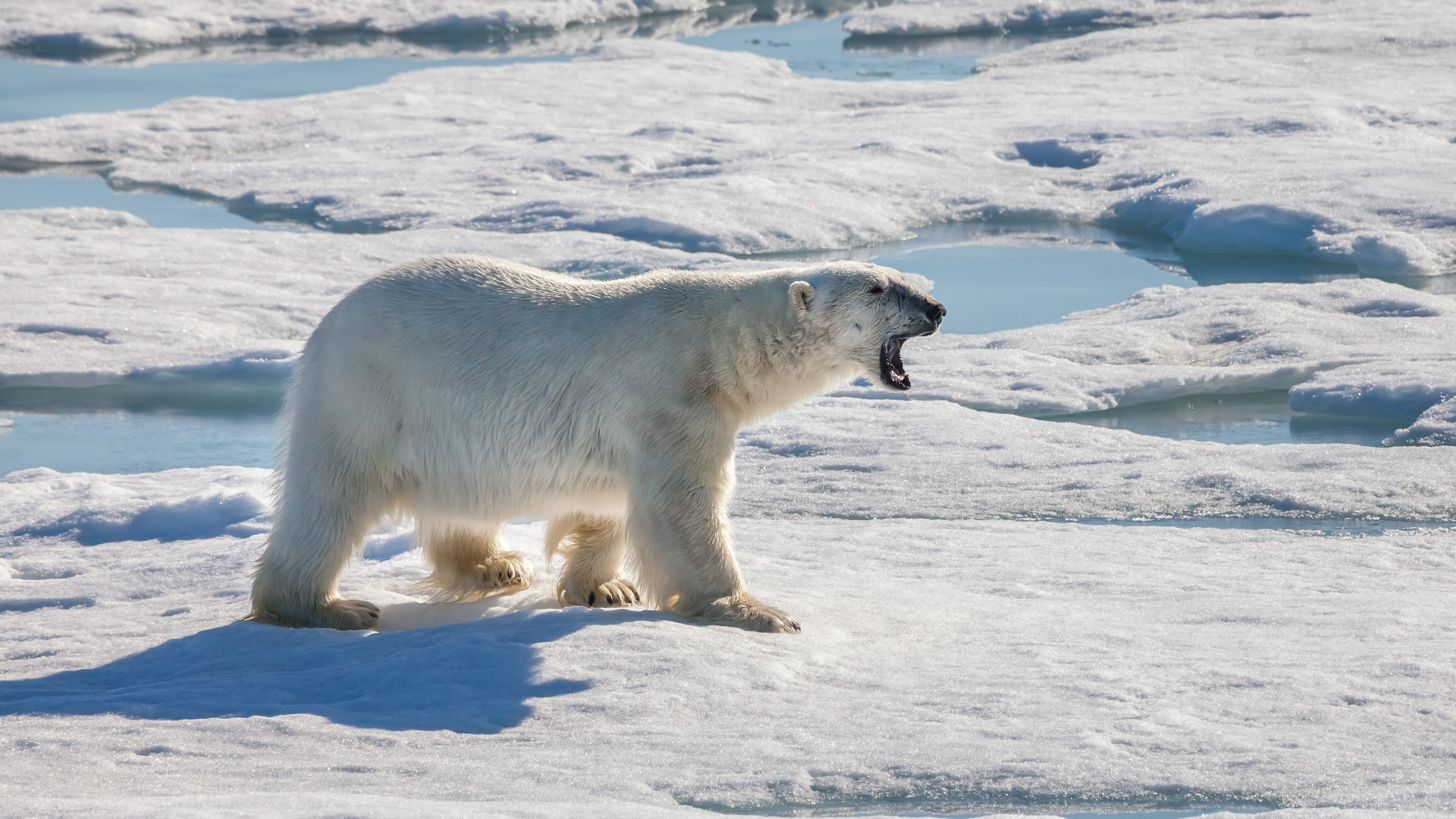

Polar bears are the primary predator of ringed seals. Ringed seal pups are especially vulnerable, and make easy kills for polar bears. Analysis of fatty acid signatures found that ringed seals are the predominant prey species for polar bears. While the ice lairs provide some protection, Arctic foxes are also a threat, as the foxes can enter the birth lairs and eat the pups. They will also eat the ringed seal remains leftover from the polar bear kills. Greenland sharks and the occasional Atlantic walrus also may prey on ringed seals in the water. Pups have several behaviors that are adaptive responses to predation pressure. These include their time spent practicing diving, use of breathing holes, prolonged lanugo stage, and ability to hide in snow caves.

== Conservation ==
=== Major threats ===
The major threat to ringed seals is habitat loss due to global climate change. Ringed seals depend on floating sea-ice platforms for reproduction. This leaves them extremely vulnerable to the effects of rising sea temperatures. The effects of a warming climate are most extreme in northern regions, where these arctic ringed seals inhabit. This is due to the albedo effect, in which melting snow and ice reduces the amount of sunlight reflected back. This means that more solar radiation is absorbed by the water, further increasing sea temperatures. Major declines in sea ice are predicted for July and November after 2050. It would take many years to restore previous ice thickness, and the loss of ice over multiple years makes it unlikely that the Arctic will return to previous conditions. This would be detrimental to ringed seals’ reproduction, foraging, and way of life. The ringed seal has a long gestational period and is only able to produce only a single pup each year. This reproductive habit makes them especially vulnerable to environmental challenges. Ringed seals need accumulated snow and stable ice to build their birth lairs. This habitat can be affected by warming temperatures, affecting the time period that the pups have to grow and mature in protection. By 2100, scientists predict that April snow cover will not be sufficient to form and occupy birth lair. They also predict that this will result in increased pup and adult mortality.

It has been proposed that increased temperatures could lead to increased biological productivity. This trend could benefit ringed seals in the short term. However, this can lead to increased vulnerability of seal pups to predation. Additionally, ocean acidification reduces seawater pH and absorption of the carbonate ions in the water. The waters of the Arctic are some of the most vulnerable to ocean acidification. The impact of ocean acidification on ringed seals could be at lower trophic levels. Seals rely on these trophic levels for food, leading to negative impacts on the seals’ dietary habits.

=== Human interactions ===
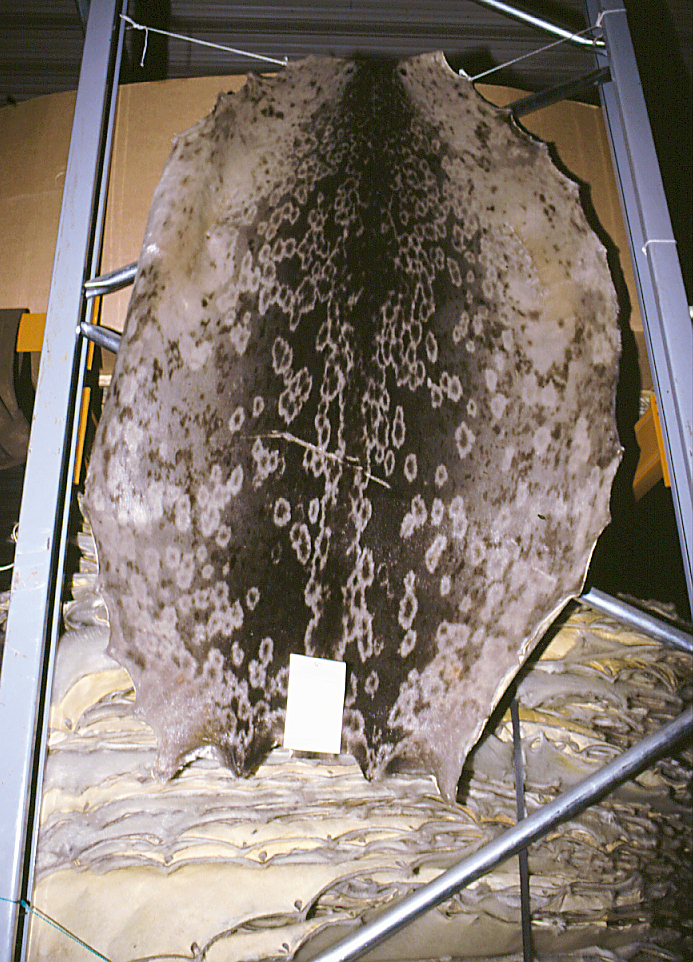

Ringed Seals have been hunted by humans for thousands of years. For indigenous peoples in the Arctic, seals have long been an important component of their diet. Early Paleoskimo sites in Arctic Canada reveal signs of harvested ringed seals dating back from c. 300-3500 BC. They are still an important resource for many northern coastal communities. Subsistence harvesting of Arctic ringed seals occurs, but in sustainable levels.

Additionally, there are many human-related threats to ringed seals. These include commercial fishing, ship traffic, petroleum drilling, pollutants, and human-aided global warming. Ringed Seals are also vulnerable to oil spills. The former Trump administration was looking to expand offshore oil drilling in the Arctic. They were also expanding fossil fuel production in the Alaska National Wildlife Refuge. Drilling for oil in the ringed seal’s habitat threatens their health and safety.

=== Conservation efforts ===
In the United States, ringed seals have been listed as threatened under the Endangered Species Act since 2012. They also are included under the Marine Mammal Protection Act. The only population that lives in US waters are the Arctic subspecies, which reside in the Alaskan waters. They are only allowed to be harvested by Alaskan Natives for subsistence hunting. There is very little overlap between the ringed seals' habitat and US commercial fishing. Therefore, human-caused mortality rates are unknown. The Act prohibits all other forms of hunting of ringed seal. However, as of March 2019, there is no designated critical habitat for ringed seals, preventing these seals from getting vital habitat protection.

In Russia, the Franz Josef State Nature Reserve protects large swaths of ringed seal habitat in the Russian Arctic. This reserve spans the White and Kara seas, a region home to many ringed seals. Additionally, there have been quotas in place and licensing of hunting for decades.

Ringed seals are listed as a species of “Least Concern” on the IUCN Red List. The Red List assessment notes that the conservation status of ringed seals should be reassessed within a decade. This is in part due to the impact of climate change on ringed seals. The European Red List also assesses the conservation status of European species according to IUCN guidelines.The IUCN Red List does not have an Action Recovery Plan at this time, nor a Systematic monitoring scheme. This may be due to the ringed seals' current listing of “Least Concern." US Fish and Wildlife Services does not list any candidate information, species status assessments, recovery plans, conservation plans, or 5 year reviews for this species. A recovery plan will likely be added in the future as their habitat deteriorates due to climate change.

=== Anticipated conservation actions ===
The IUCN recommends conservation actions which manage and protect the species, land, and water. Specifically, there needs to be effort to protect and manage the site, including resources and habitat. Procuring critical habitat designation under the Endangered Species Act would promote population recovery. More research must be done on population size, distribution, and trends, in order to design effective conservation plans.
