= Listvyanka =

Listvyanka (Russian: Листвянка) is the name of several inhabited localities in Russia.

Urban localities

- Listvyanka, Irkutsky District, Irkutsk Oblast, a work settlement in Irkutsky District, Irkutsk Oblast

Rural localities

- Listvyanka, Altai Krai, a selo in Chauzovsky Selsoviet of Topchikhinsky District of Altai Krai
- Listvyanka, Kuytunsky District, Irkutsk Oblast, a village in Kuytunsky District, Irkutsk Oblast
- Listvyanka, Izhmorsky District, Kemerovo Oblast, a village in Troitskaya Rural Territory of Izhmorsky District of Kemerovo Oblast
- Listvyanka, Tisulsky District, Kemerovo Oblast, a village in Listvyanskaya Rural Territory of Tisulsky District of Kemerovo Oblast
- Listvyanka, Topkinsky District, Kemerovo Oblast, a settlement in Shishinskaya Rural Territory of Topkinsky District of Kemerovo Oblast
- Listvyanka, Tyazhinsky District, Kemerovo Oblast, a settlement in Listvyanskaya Rural Territory of Tyazhinsky District of Kemerovo Oblast
- Listvyanka, Kurgan Oblast, a village in Kosolapovsky Selsoviet of Tselinny District of Kurgan Oblast
- Listvyanka, Moscow Oblast, a settlement in Bereznyakovskoye Rural Settlement of Sergiyevo-Posadsky District of Moscow Oblast
- Listvyanka, Novosibirsk Oblast, a selo in Cherepanovsky District of Novosibirsk Oblast
- Listvyanka, Orenburg Oblast, a settlement in Burlyksky Selsoviet of Belyayevsky District of Orenburg Oblast
- Listvyanka, Ryazan Oblast, a settlement in Listvyansky Rural Okrug of Ryazansky District of Ryazan Oblast
