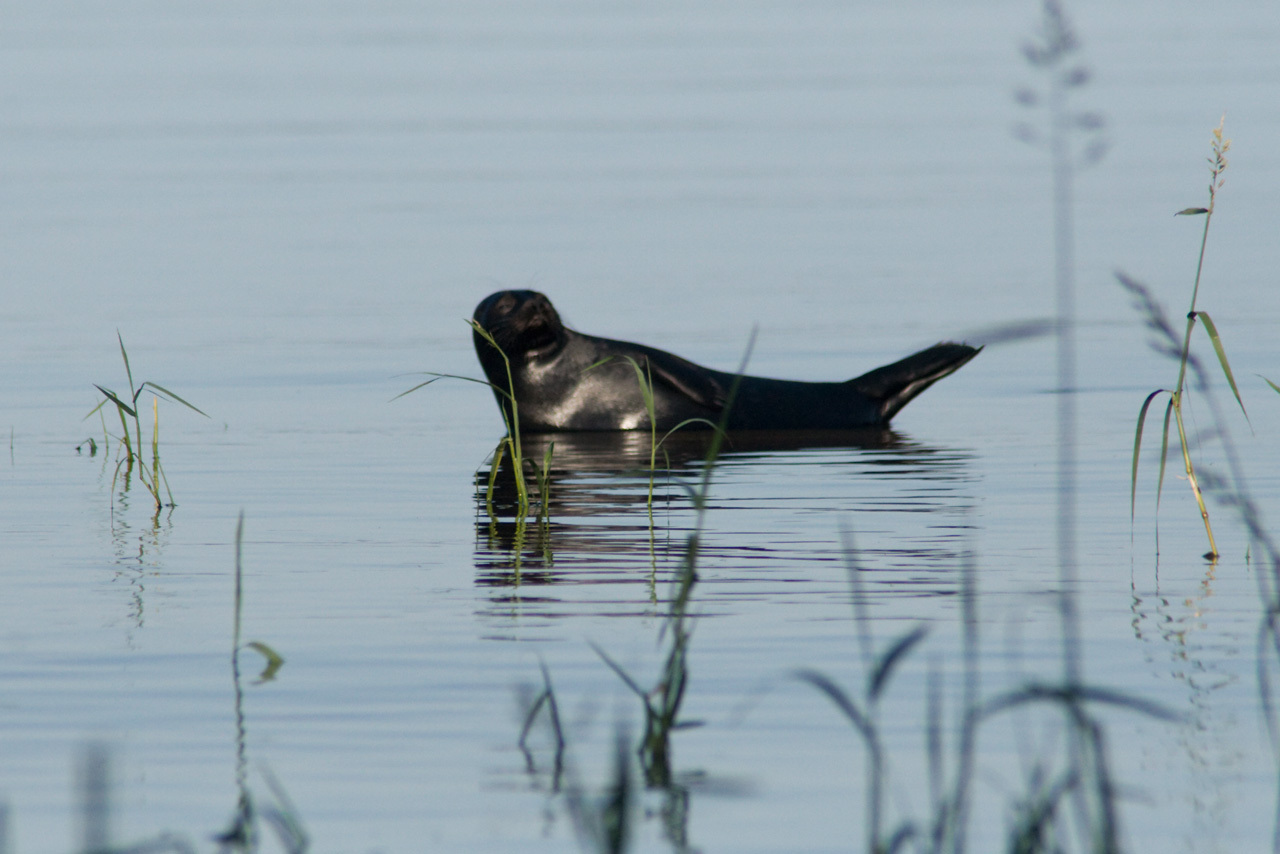

Conservation status
- Vulnerable (IUCN 3.1)

Scientific classification
- Kingdom: Animalia
- Phylum: Chordata
- Class: Mammalia
- Order: Carnivora
- Parvorder: Pinnipedia
- Family: Phocidae
- Genus: Pusa
- Species: P. hispida
- Subspecies: P. h. ladogensis

Trinomial name
- Pusa hispida ladogensis (Nordquist, 1899)

Synonyms
- Phoca hispida ladogensis

= Ladoga ringed seal =

Freshwater seal found in northwestern Russia

The Ladoga ringed seal (Russian: Ладожская нерпа; Pusa hispida ladogensis) is a freshwater subspecies of the ringed seal (Pusa hispida) found entirely in Lake Ladoga in northwestern Russia. This pinniped was isolated in freshwater lakes and separated from the Arctic ringed seal as a result of the isostatic rebound of the region following the end of the Weichselian Glaciation.

It is related to the even smaller population of Saimaa ringed seals in Lake Saimaa, a lake that flows into Ladoga through the Vuoksi River.

== Appearance ==
The adult Ladoga seal grows to about 150 cm in length and weighs approximately 60–70 kg. Pups are approximately 50–60 cm at birth and weigh approximately 4–5 kg. There are four variations of coats. About 47% of Ladoga seals have a dark brown coat with lighter ring shaped patterns, 29% have a dark brown coat with lighter vein-like patterns, and 17% have a light brown coat with a dark dorsal belt as well as faint rings and spots. The coats of the remaining 7% are not described by Popov. Annual molting takes place from April through June.

== Reproduction ==
Females reach maturity at the age of four to five, and males at the age of six to seven. Pups are delivered in February through March, with weaning taking place after six to eight weeks. A normal lifespan is about 30–35 years.

== Conservation ==
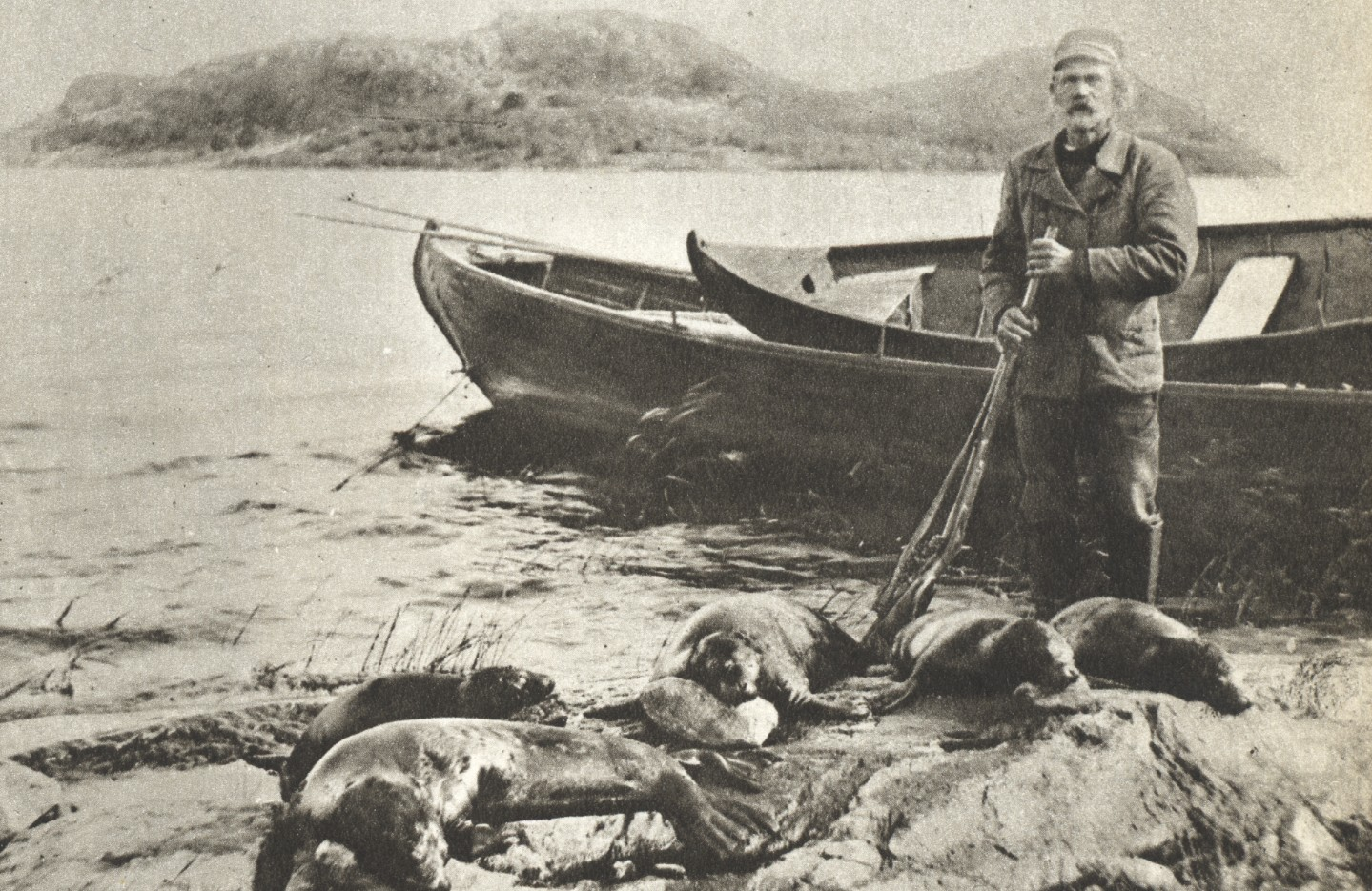
Ringed seal hunter Juho Pöllänen from Sortavala at the shores of Ladoga with his prey in 1909

The current population is about 2,000–3,000, down from approximately 20,000 at the beginning of the 20th century, due to overhunting; hunting of the seals was banned entirely in 1980, but some illegal poaching still occurs. The species' primary threats include entanglement in fisheries netting, industrialization in the areas surrounding Lake Ladoga, fuel spills from water vessels and the disturbance of their warm-weather sunning places by human recreational activities. The Ladoga seal is listed as an Appendix II species under the Bern Convention and also included in the Red Data Book of the Russian Federation.
