= Ungava seal =

Conservation status
- Endangered (IUCN 3.1)

- Critically Imperiled (NatureServe)

Scientific classification
- Kingdom: Animalia
- Phylum: Chordata
- Class: Mammalia
- Order: Carnivora
- Parvorder: Pinnipedia
- Family: Phocidae
- Genus: Phoca
- Species: P. vitulina
- Subspecies: P. v. mellonae

Trinomial name
- Phoca vitulina mellonae Doutt, 1942

Subspecies of harbor seal

The Ungava seal (Phoca vitulina mellonae) is a subspecies of Harbor seal, endemic to a small series of freshwater lakes in the Ungava Peninsula, located in northern Quebec. It is noted for being one of the few examples of freshwater seals. It was thought that fewer than 100 individuals remained in 2020. The Ungava seal is currently classified by the International Union for Conservation of Nature as endangered.

== Evolution ==
Although very little is known about the Ungava seal due to limited studies, it is hypothesized that they entered their habitat using the Tyrrell sea anywhere between 3000 and 8000 years ago, where they then became trapped inside the freshwater lakes as the Laurentide Ice Sheet retreated.

== Diet ==
A study found that the Lake trout and Lake whitefish population in the Ungava peninsula were more depressed than the Brook trout population, suggesting that the Ungava seals diet mainly consists of the former two. This could be due to preference, however its more likely because the brook trouts spawning occurs in sheltered locations, making them inaccessible to seals during a vulnerable period.
