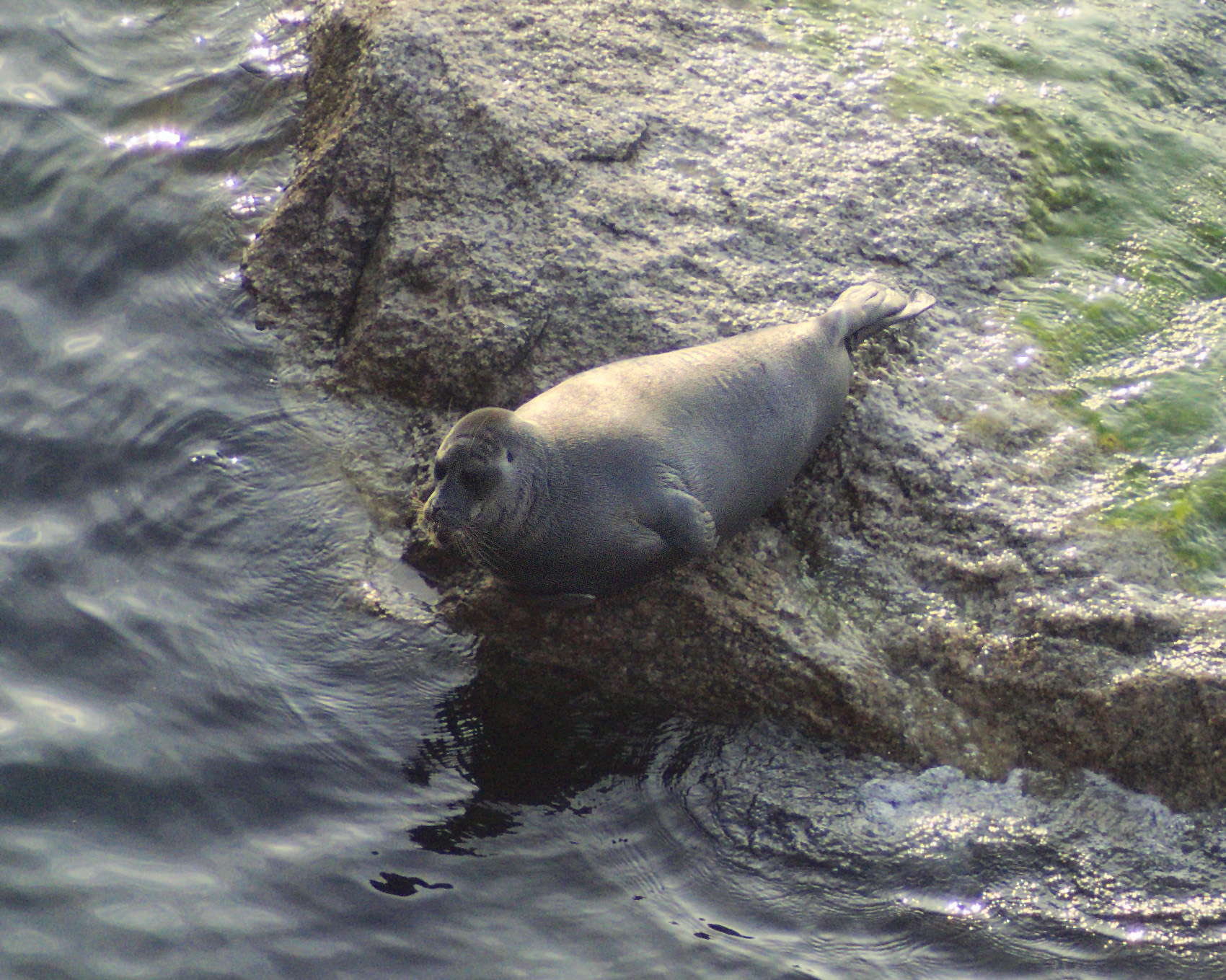
- Baikal seal

Scientific classification
- Kingdom: Animalia
- Phylum: Chordata
- Class: Mammalia
- Order: Carnivora
- Parvorder: Pinnipedia
- Family: Phocidae
- Subfamily: Phocinae
- Tribe: Phocini
- Genus: Pusa; Scopoli, 1771

Type species
- Phoca foetica (now Pusa hispida) Schreber, 1775

Species
- Pusa caspica Pusa hispida Pusa sibirica Pusa saimensis
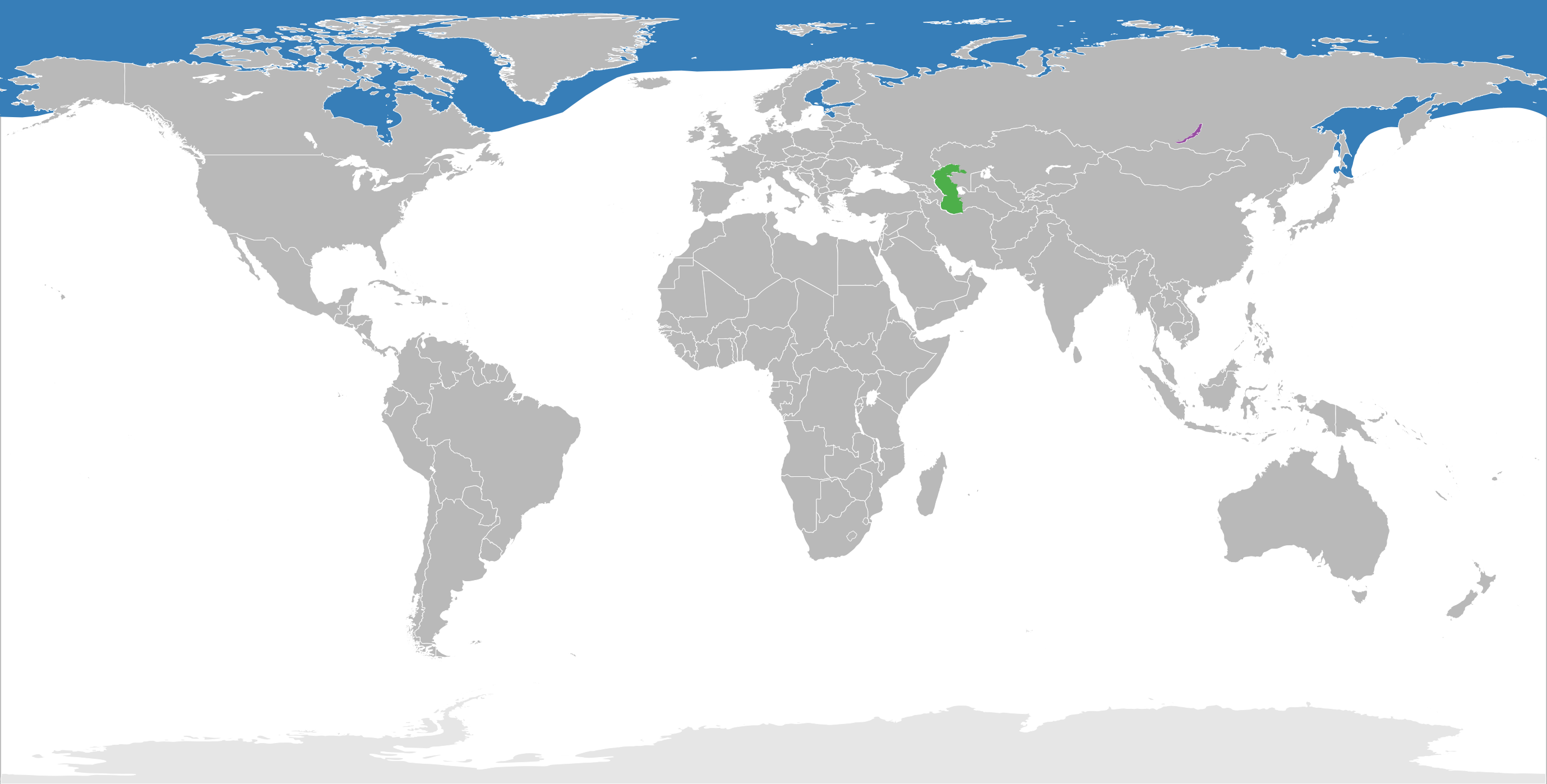
- Pusa distribution P. hispida in blue, P. caspica in green, P. sibirica in purple

= Pusa =

Genus of mammals

Pusa is a genus of the earless seals, within the family Phocidae. The genus were split from the genus Phoca, and some sources still give Phoca as an acceptable synonym for Pusa.

The species in this genus are found in Arctic and subarctic regions, as well as around the Caspian Sea. This includes these countries and regions: Russia, Finland, Scandinavia, Britain, Greenland, Canada, the United States, Iran, Azerbaijan, Kazakhstan, and Japan. Due to changing local environmental conditions, the ringed seals found in the Canadian region has varied patterns of growth. The northern Canadian ringed seals grow slowly to a larger size, while the southern seals grow quickly to a smaller size. The International Union for Conservation of Nature recognizes three species of seals in Pusa, while other sources additionally recognize the Saimaa ringed seal as a distinct species rather than a subspecies of the ringed seal.

The Caspian seal and Saimaa ringed seal are endangered, while the Ladoga seal subspecies of the ringed seal is categorized as vulnerable.

== Taxonomy ==
- Pusa
  - - - Ringed seal
      - Saimaa ringed seal
    - Baikal seal
  - Caspian seal

Cladogram showing relationships among the extant members of genus Pusa, combining several phylogenetic analyses.

=== Species ===
Genus Pusa – Scopoli, 1771 – four species
| Common name | Scientific name and subspecies | Range | Size and ecology | IUCN status and estimated population |
|---|---|---|---|---|
| Caspian seal | Pusa caspica (Gmelin, 1788) | Caspian Sea | Size: about 126–129 cm (50–51 in) in length. Adults weigh around 86 kg (190 lb) Habitat: Diet: crustaceans and various fish species, such as Clupeonella engrauliformis, C. grimmi, C. caspia, Gobiidae, Rutilus caspicus, Atherina boyeri, and Sander lucioperca | EN |
| Ringed seal | Pusa hispida (Schreber, 1775) Five subspecies: P. h. hispida in the Arctic Ocean and Bering Sea; P. h. ochotensis in the Sea of Okhotsk; P. h. saimensis in Lake Saimaa in Finland; P. h. ladogensis in nearby Lake Ladoga in Russia; P.h. botnica in the Gulf of Bothnia. | northern coast of Japan in the Pacific, and throughout the North Atlantic coasts of Greenland and Scandinavia as far south as Newfoundland, and include two freshwater subspecies in northern Europe | Size: 100 to 175 cm (39.5 to 69 in) and weigh from 32 to 140 kg (71 to 309 lb). The seal averages about 5 ft (1.5 m) long with a weight of about 50–70 kg (110–150 lb) Habitat: Diet: mysids, shrimp, arctic cod, and herring | LC |
| Saimaa ringed seal | Pusa saimensis (Nordqvist, 1899) | Saimaa | Size: Habitat: Diet: | EN |
| Baikal seal or nerpa | Pusa sibirica Gmelin, 1788 | Lake Baikal in Siberia, Russia | Size: Habitat: Diet: | LC |
