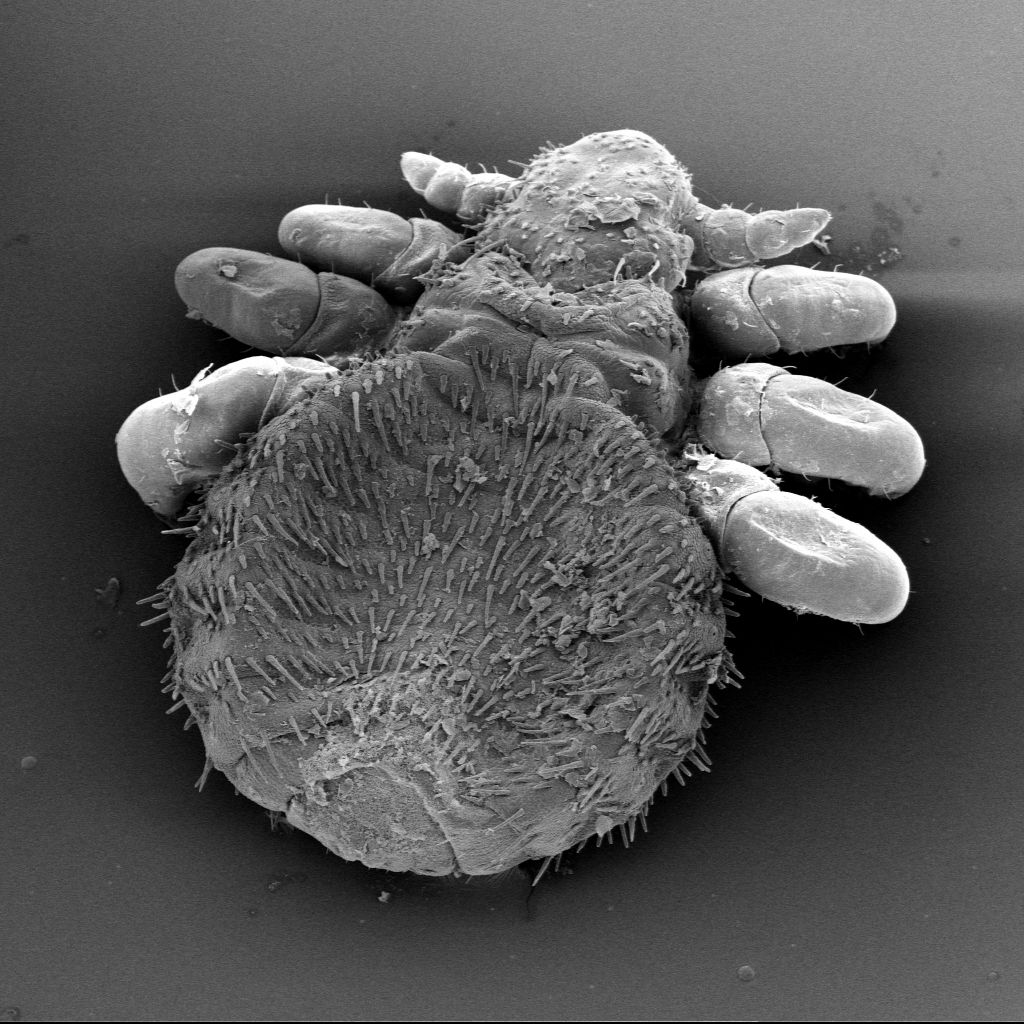
- Echinophthirius horridus

Scientific classification
- Kingdom: Animalia
- Phylum: Arthropoda
- Clade: Pancrustacea
- Class: Insecta
- Order: Psocodea
- Suborder: Troctomorpha
- Infraorder: Phthiraptera
- Parvorder: Anoplura
- Family: Echinophthiriidae; Enderlein, 1904

Genera
- Antarctophthirus; Echinophthirius; Latagophthirus; Lepidophthirus; Proechinophthirus

= Echinophthiriidae =

Family of lice

Echinophthiriidae is a family of lice in the suborder Anoplura, the sucking lice. This family of lice are parasites of seals and the river otter, and are the only insects that infest aquatic hosts.

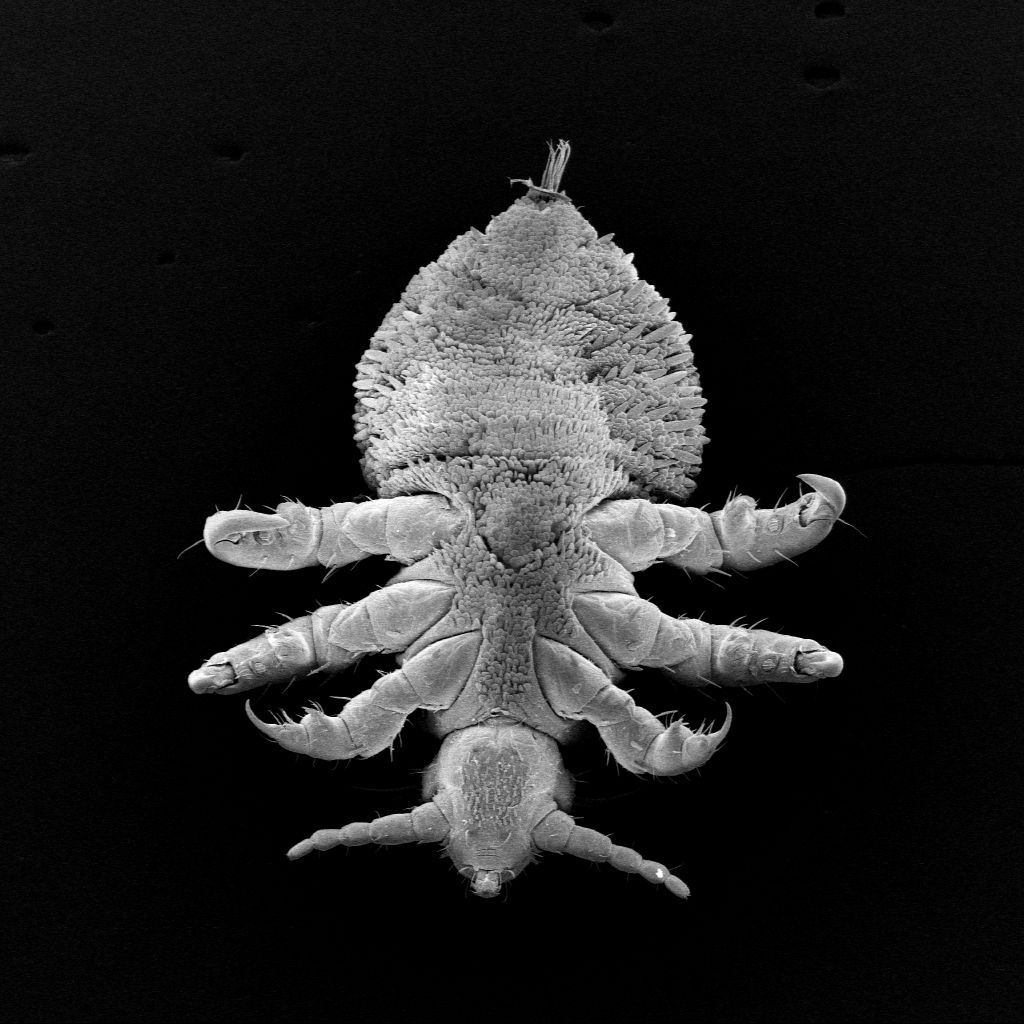
Antarctophthirus trichechi

These lice have adaptations influenced by the anatomy of their hosts. Because some marine mammals, such as fur seals, have a layer of air trapped under their waterproof coats that insulates them against cold water, their lice actually live in a mostly dry, warm habitat. Other mammals have blubber for insulation, so their skin is in contact with the water; their lice parasites live in a cold aquatic environment.

Lice in this family have a chaetotaxy characterized by three kinds of setae: spines, scales, and hairs. Different species have different arrangements of these setae. Species also have various egg-laying habits, with some laying them singly or in clusters, and some cementing them to the hairs of the host animal. These lice have antennae but no eyes. In most species the middle and rear pairs of legs are larger with blunt claws while the front pair of legs is smaller with pointed claws. Scanning electron microscope examination shows that the species Antarctophthirus microchir uses its larger middle and rear pairs of legs to cling to the hairs of its host, and the smaller, pointed front legs are probably sensory structures.

Depending on species and temperature, the life cycle of one of these lice can take about 2 to 4 weeks. Each species tends to favor a different part of the host animal's body; for example, Antarctophthirus ogmirhini lives on the back flippers and tail and Lepidophthirus macrorhini favors the flippers, including the digits and the webbing between them. Proechinophthirus fluctus lives under the fur, while Antarctophthirus callorhini prefers parts with naked skin, such as the nostrils and eyelids of the host. Lice may serve as intermediate hosts or vectors for parasites of their hosts. Echinophthirius horridus is an intermediate host of Dipetalonema spirocauda, a nematode parasite of harbour seals.

== Species ==
There are 13 species classified in 5 genera. Taxa and their host animals include:

- Genus Antarctophthirus
  - Antarctophthirus callorhini (on Northern fur seals)
  - Antarctophthirus carlinii (on Weddell seals)
  - Antarctophthirus lobodontis (on Crabeater seals)
  - Antarctophthirus mawsoni (on Ross seals)
  - Antarctophthirus microchir (on multiple species of sea lions)
  - Antarctophthirus ogmirhini (on Leopard seals)
  - Antarctophthirus trichechi (on walruses)
- Genus Echinophthirius, one species:
  - Echinophthirius horridus (on phocines)
- Genus Latagophthirus, one species:
  - Latagophthirus rauschi (on Northern river otters)
- Genus Lepidophthirus, two species:
  - Lepidophthirus macrorhini (on Southern elephant seals)
  - Lepidophthirus piriformis (on Monk seals)
- Genus Proechinophthirus, two species:
  - Proechinophthirus fluctus (on Northern fur seals)
  - Proechinophthirus zumpti (on Southern fur seals)

=== Phylogeny ===
Being obligate parasites of seals, the evolution of Echinopthiriids is thought to be "intimately associated with pinniped evolution"; the river otter louse Latagophthirus is thought to support this hypothesis, as pinnipeds were thought to have evolved from a non-marine ancestor and only diverged into the earless seals and otaries after becoming marine, with the lice infesting them speciating alongside. Below is a partitioned maximum likelihood phylogenetic tree based on a concatenated sequence alignment of 1022 nuclear genes taken from louse species, with their hosts listed in brackets. Notably, the taxonomy of host species do not always conform to the lice's own:

- Pediculus humanus (humans)
- - Haematopinus eurysternus (Suina)
  - - Lepidophthirus macrorhini (Southern elephant seal)
    - - Proechinophthirus fluctus (Northern fur seal)
      - - - Antarctophthirus microchir (Southern sea lion)
          - Antarctophthirus microchir (Australian sea lion)
        - - Antarctophthirus lobodontis (Crabeater seal)
          - - Antarctophthirus ogmorhini (Leopard seal)
            - Antarctophthirus carlinii (Weddell seal)

This result was also recovered in a study of mitochondrial protein-coding genes of a more diverse assemblage of lice species.
