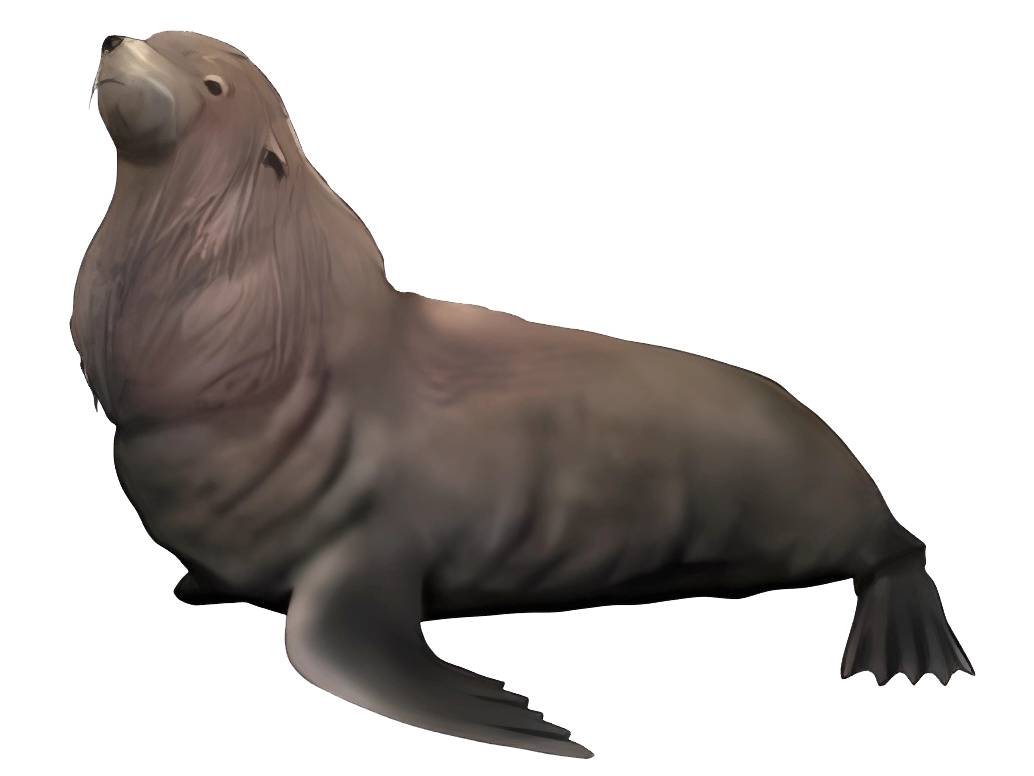

Scientific classification
- Kingdom: Animalia
- Phylum: Chordata
- Class: Mammalia
- Order: Carnivora
- Parvorder: Pinnipedia
- Family: Otariidae
- Genus: Callorhinus
- Species: †C. gilmorei

Binomial name
- †Callorhinus gilmorei Berta & Deméré, 1986

= Callorhinus gilmorei =

Callorhinus gilmorei Temporal range: Pliocene - Early Pleistocene

Extinct species of pinniped

Callorhinus gilmorei is an extinct species of fur seal that lived in Japan and western North America during the Pliocene and Early Pleistocene.

Callorhinus gilmorei was similar to its close relative, the living northern fur seal (C. ursinus). It mainly differed in having more primitive dental features, such as double-rooted cheek teeth, and in the structure of the mandible.
