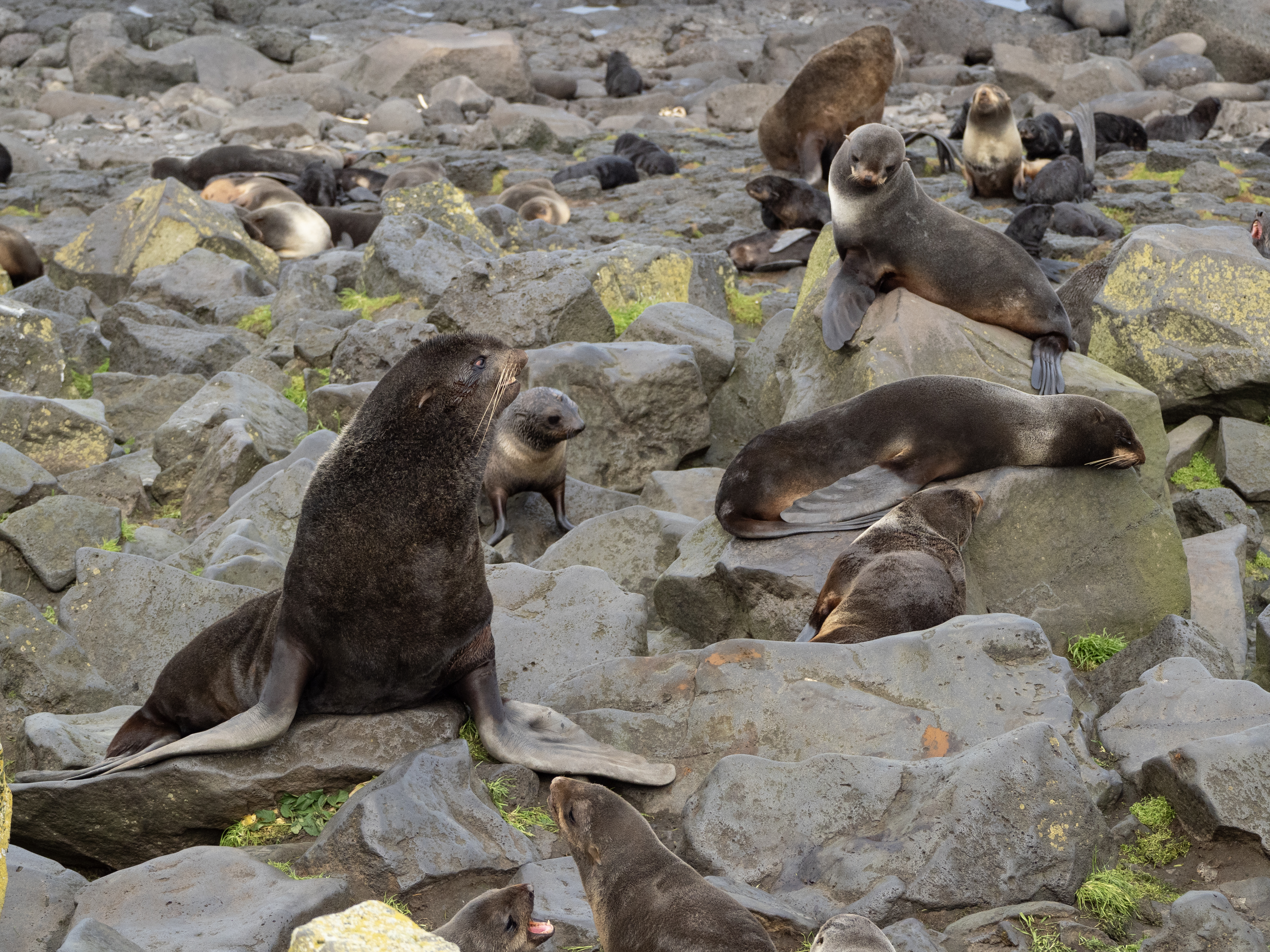

Conservation status
- Vulnerable (IUCN 3.1)

Scientific classification
- Kingdom: Animalia
- Phylum: Chordata
- Class: Mammalia
- Order: Carnivora
- Parvorder: Pinnipedia
- Family: Otariidae
- Genus: Callorhinus
- Species: C. ursinus

Binomial name
- Callorhinus ursinus (Linnaeus, 1758)
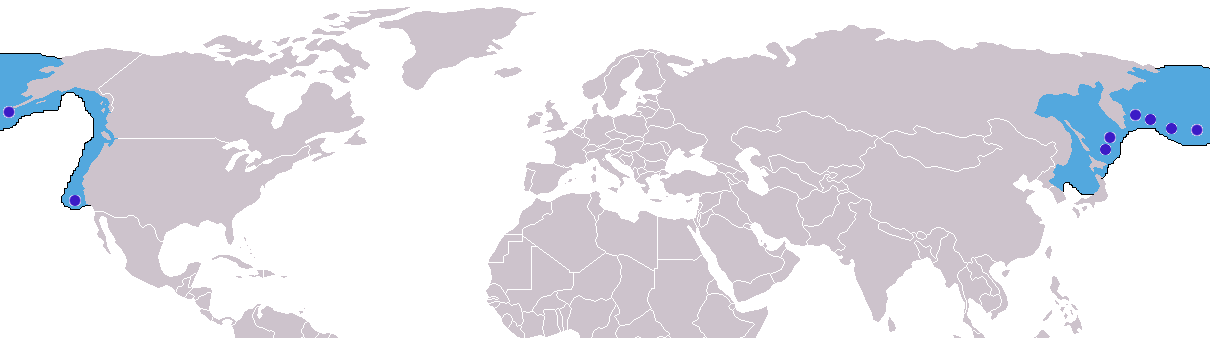
breeding colonies
non-breeding population

Synonyms
- Phoca ursina Linnaeus, 1758

= Northern fur seal =

Only fur seal in the northern hemisphere

The northern fur seal (Callorhinus ursinus) is an eared seal found along the north Pacific Ocean, the Bering Sea, Sea of Japan and the Sea of Okhotsk. It is the largest member of the fur seal subfamily (Arctocephalinae) and the only living species in the genus Callorhinus. A single fossil species, Callorhinus gilmorei, is known from the mid-late Pliocene of California, Mexico, and Japan.

== Description ==
Northern fur seals exhibit sexual dimorphism, with males being about a third longer and more than 4.5 times heavier than adult females. Both sexes have short, down-curved muzzles and a small nose in which extends slightly beyond the mouth in females and a bit more in males. The lush pelage is thick with a dense, cream-colored underfur. This underfur is covered with longer guard hairs that can be seen when the fur is wet and their flippers are unique of the species. Due to the cartilaginous extensions on all of the toes, the fur seal species has the longest hind flippers in any otariid. The ear pinnae are long and in older individuals, lose the dark fur on the tips. Young pups are born with a black pelt, gaining colors of darker brown across the body and lighter coloration on the chest and belly. Adult males also have gray hair on the back of their necks in contrast to females. Seen especially in females and juveniles, the eyes are proportionately large.

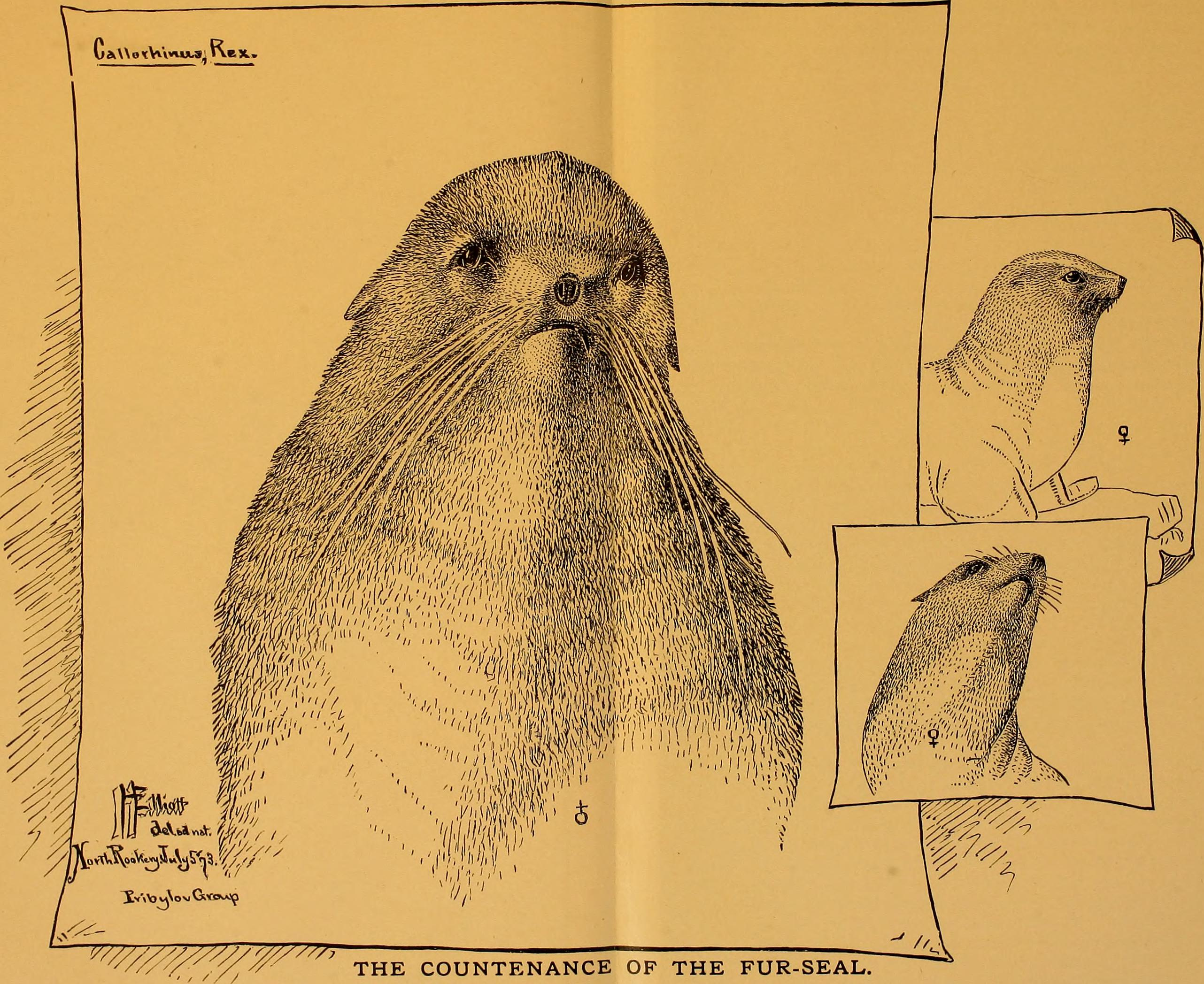
1898 depiction of callorhinus in Cumberland Sound

The adult males have strong, stocky bodies with enlarged necks and a course maned filled with longer guard hairs that extends from the lower neck to the shoulders. They have coat colors that range from gray to black to reddish dark brown all over. Even with their large size and big skulls, the heads of the males appear to be short along with their short muzzle and the back of the head being tucked away behind the ear pinnae. Also seen in adult males, the canine teeth are longer and have a greater diameter.

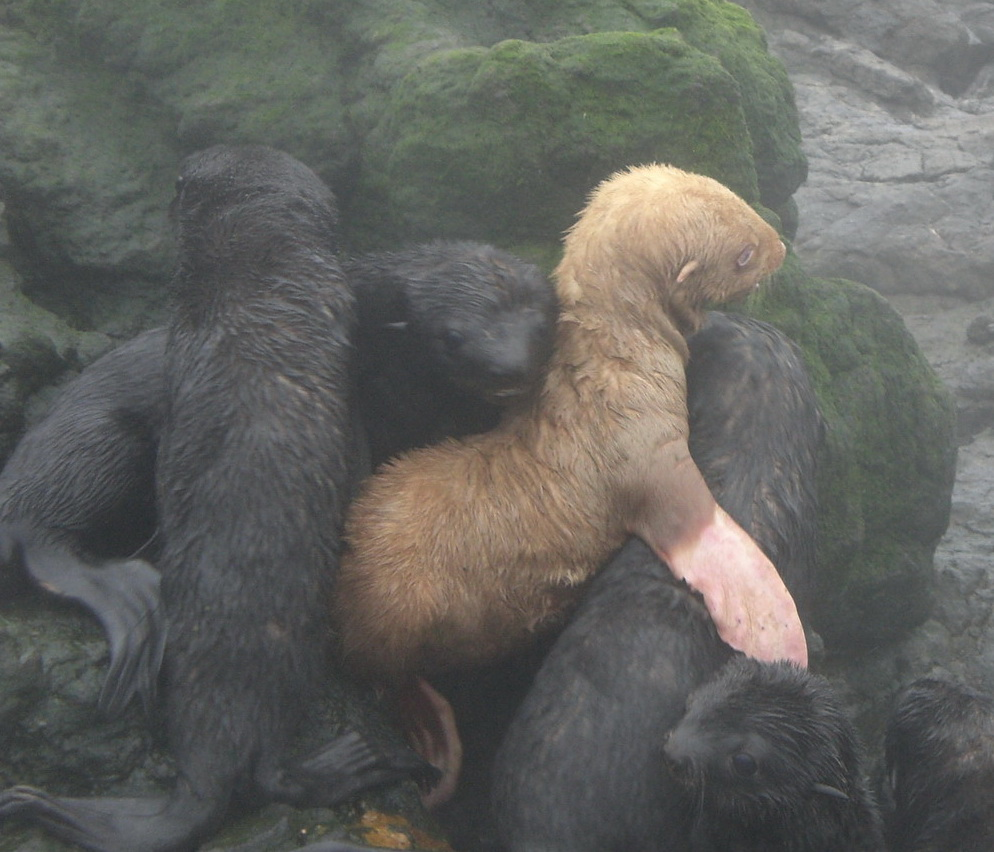
Fur seal pups, including one rare albino

It is a challenge to differentiate the sexes until the individual reaches age five. Adult females and subadults have a coat of dark silver-gray with more complex coloration than adult males. The flanks, sides, parts of the muzzle and chin are a creamy tan to rust color and also create a sort of 'brush stroke' that runs backwards underneath each eye. Starting from birth, young pups have a blackish coat with oval areas of buff on the sides, axillary area, and on the muzzle. Then after three to four months, these pups molt to the color of adult females and subadults.

"Males can be as large as 2.1 m (6 ft 11 in) and 270 kg (600 lb). Females can be up to 1.5 m (4 ft 11 in) and weigh 50 kg (110 lb) or more. Newborns weigh 5.4–6 kg (12–13 lb), and are 60–65 cm (24–26 in) long."

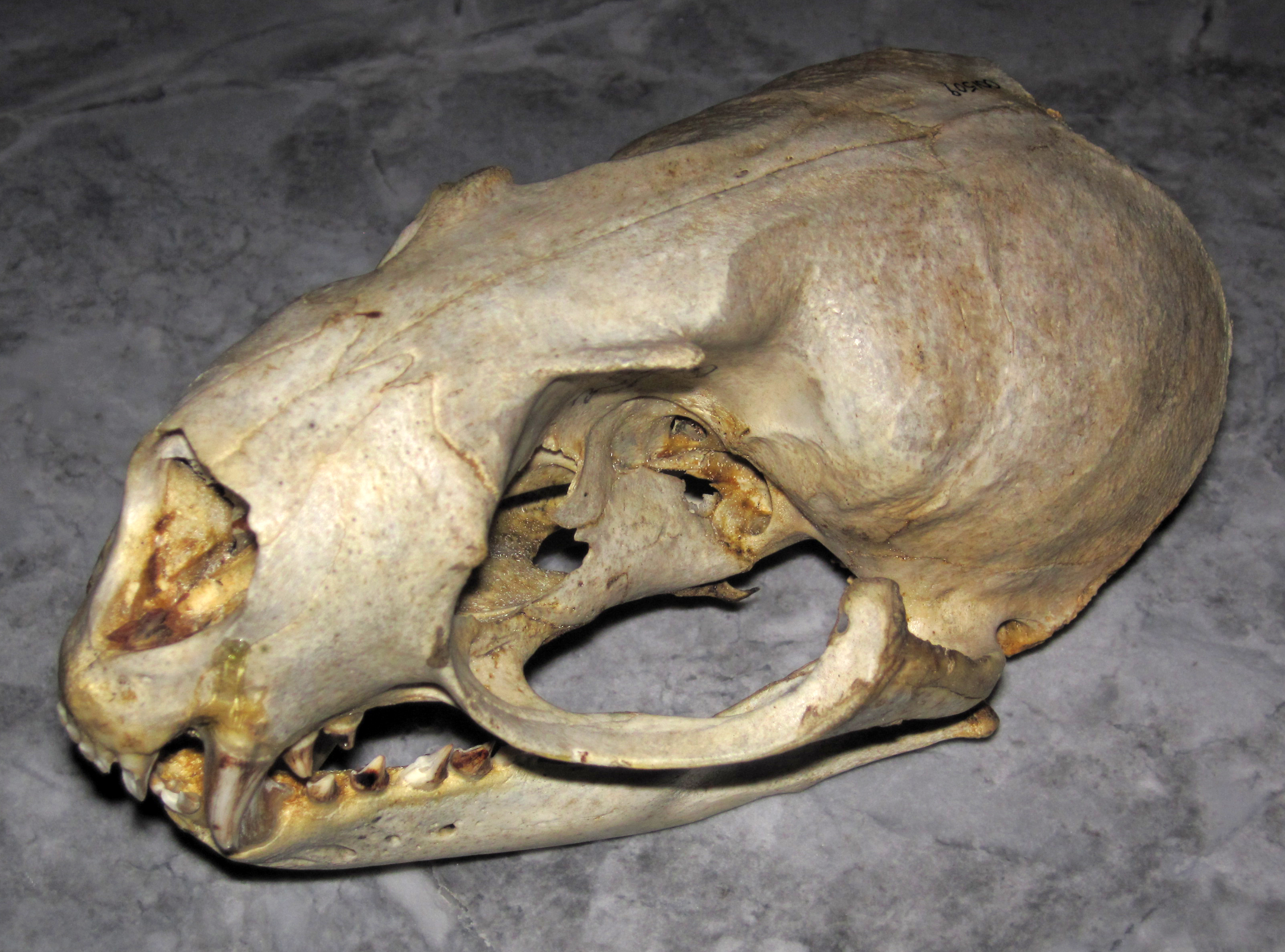
The skull

The teeth are haplodont, common in carnivorous marine mammals adapted to tearing fish flesh. As with most caniforms, the upper canines are prominent. The dental formula of the adult is 3.1.4.22.1.4.1.

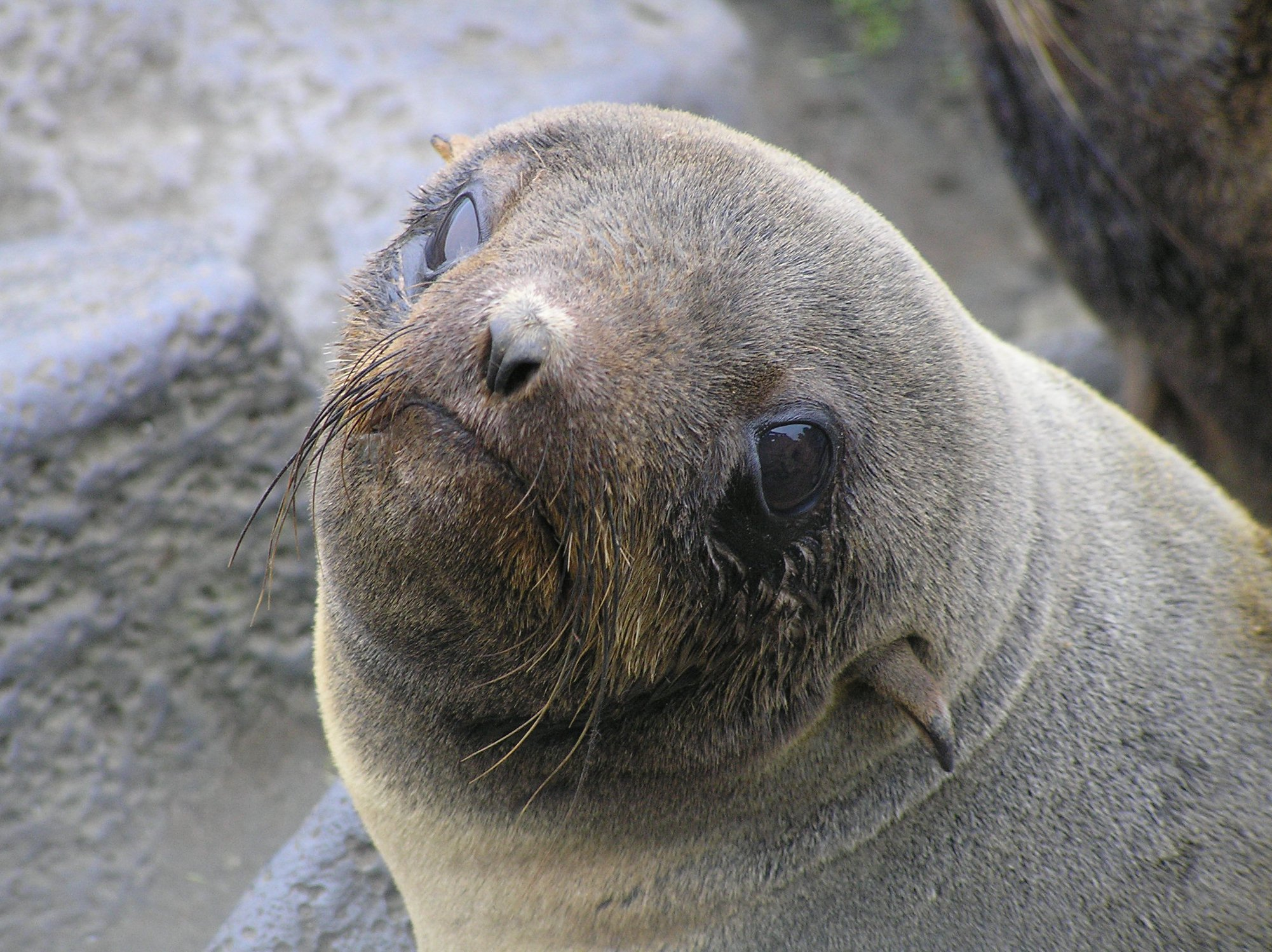
Close up of face and ears

Like other otariids, northern fur seals are built for efficient terrestrial locomotion. Their hind limbs are in a plantigrade stance and are able to rotate under the body for quadrupedal locomotion and support. When swimming, there are two different types of movement: locomotion and diving. These seals swim primarily with forelimb propulsion due to their physiology. They have flexible joints between vertebrae for better maneuverability in the water as well as "greater muscular leverage" for pectoral strokes. Stroke patterns are different for different dive types and locomotion, and stroke rates vary for individuals since there is a relationship between maximum stroke rate and body size.

== Distribution and habitat ==
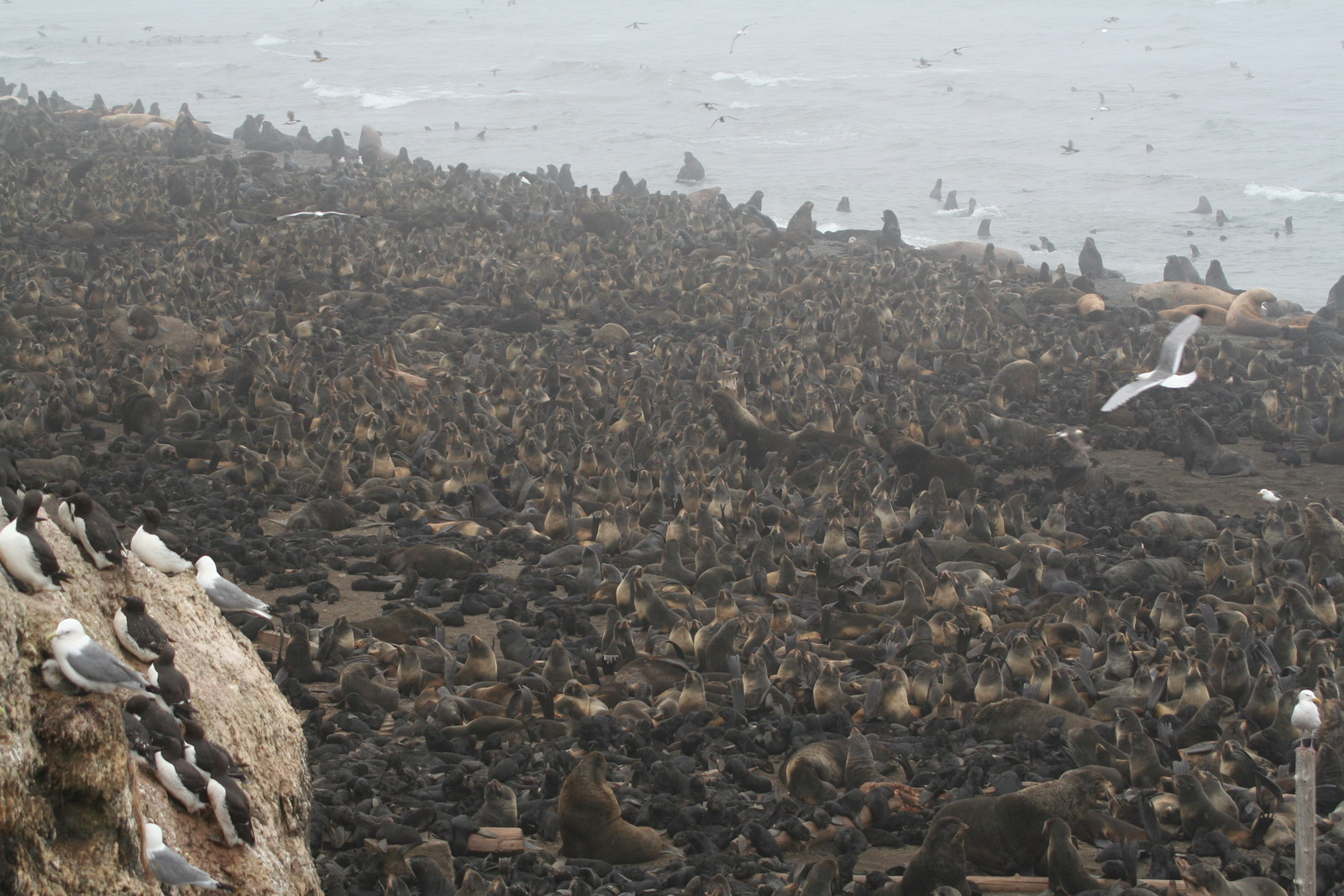
Overview of rookery

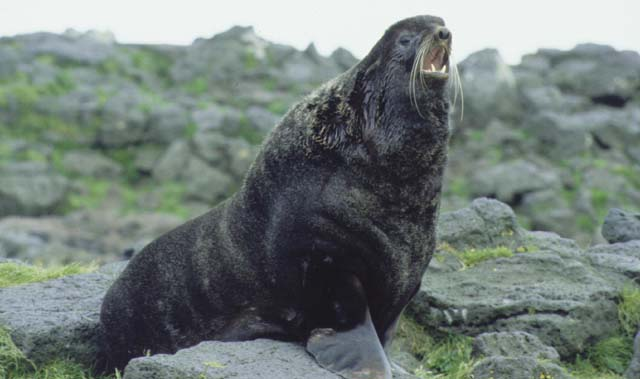
Bull

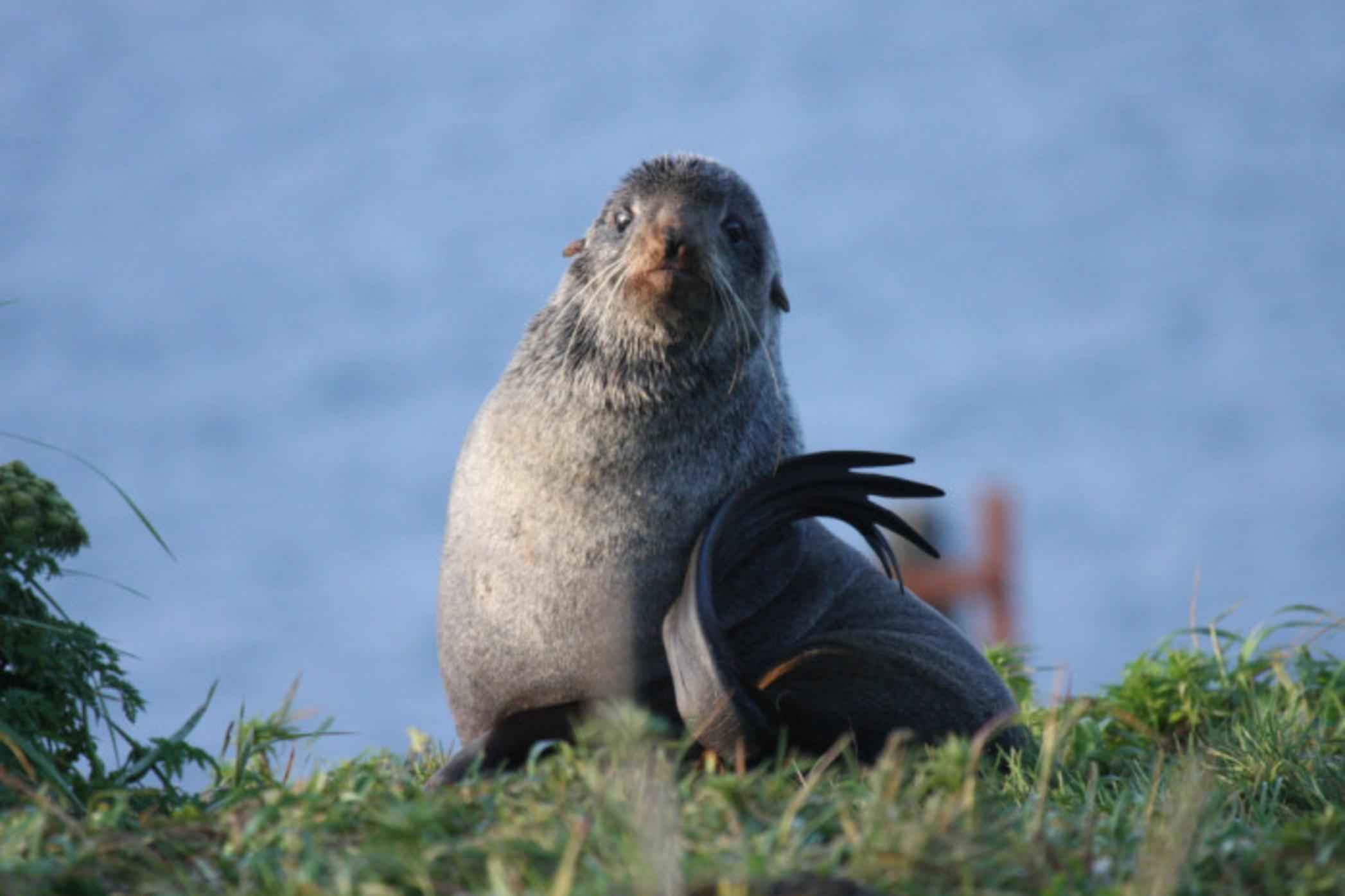
Cow

The northern fur seal is found in the north Pacific – its southernmost reach is a line that runs roughly from the southern tip of Japan to the southern tip of the Baja California Peninsula, the Sea of Okhotsk, and the Bering Sea. An estimated 1.1 million northern fur seals occur across the range, of which roughly half breed on the Pribilof Islands in the east Bering Sea. Another 200–250 thousand breed on the Commander Islands in the west Bering Sea, some 100,000 breed on Tyuleniy Island off the coast of Sakhalin in the southwest Sea of Okhotsk, and another 60–70 thousand in the central Kuril Islands in Russia. Smaller rookeries (around 5,000 animals) are found on Bogoslof Island in the Aleutian Chain, San Miguel Island in the Channel Island group and South Farallon Island off the coast of California. Evidence from stable isotope analysis of Holocene fur seal bone collagen (δ^{13}C and δ^{15}N) indicates that before the maritime fur trade, it was more common for these animals to breed at local rookeries in British Columbia, California, Oregon, Washington, and likely along much of the northwest coast of North America.

During the winter, northern fur seals display a net movement southward, with animals from Russian rookeries regularly entering Japanese and Korean waters in the Sea of Japan and Alaskan animals moving along the central and eastern Pacific to British Columbia, Canada and as far south as Baja California.

The northern fur seal's range overlaps almost exactly with that of Steller sea lions; occasional cohabitation occurs at reproductive rookeries, notably in the Kurils, the Commander Islands, and Tyulen'i Islands. The only other fur seal found in the Northern Hemisphere is the Guadalupe fur seal which overlaps slightly with the northern fur seal's range in California.

== Ecology ==
This species is considered a generalist that takes on a varying diet dependent on location and season from midwater fish to squid. In Alaskan waters and the Bering Sea shelf, walleye pollock, capelin, and several species of squid are consumed most. When entering the West Coast, mackerel, octopus, sardine and more become staples in the diet. Colony-specific areas are targetted for foraging opportunities with other preferred land sites used for resting and reproduction/raising their young.

Northern fur seals are preyed upon primarily by sharks and killer whales. Occasionally, very young animals are eaten by Steller sea lions.

Due to very high densities of pups on reproductive rookeries and the early age at which mothers begin their foraging trips, mortality can be relatively high. Consequently, pup carcasses are important in enriching the diet of many scavengers, in particular gulls and Arctic foxes.

In 2017, 14 samples of spiny lice were collected off of the nasal passage of fur seal pups. In 2021, these spiny lice were identified as having unique bristle arrangements, and were given the scientific name Antarctophthirus nevelskoyi. They were named after the famous Russian explorer, Admiral Gennady Ivanovich Nevelsky.

== Reproductive behavior ==
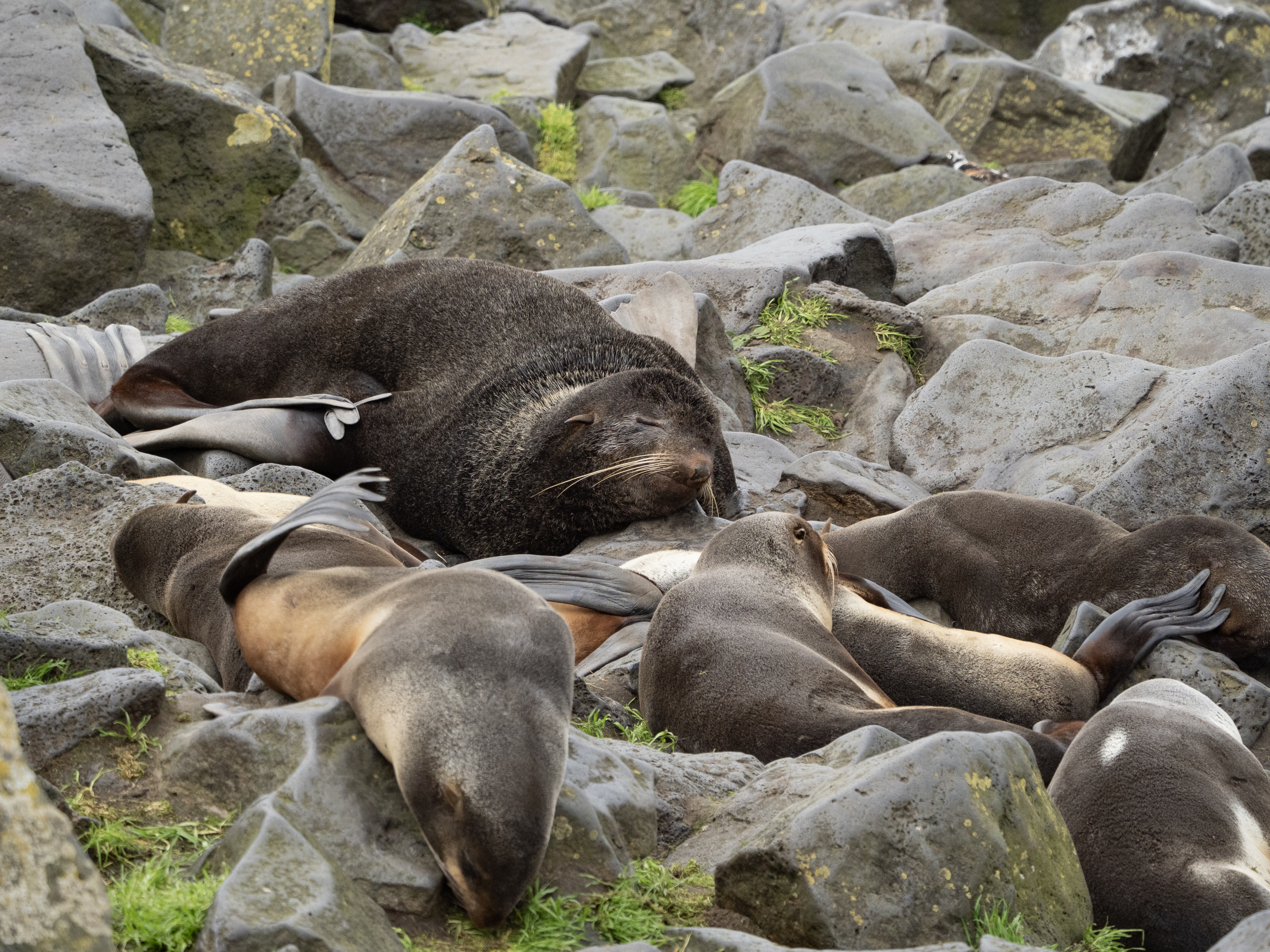
Male and harem

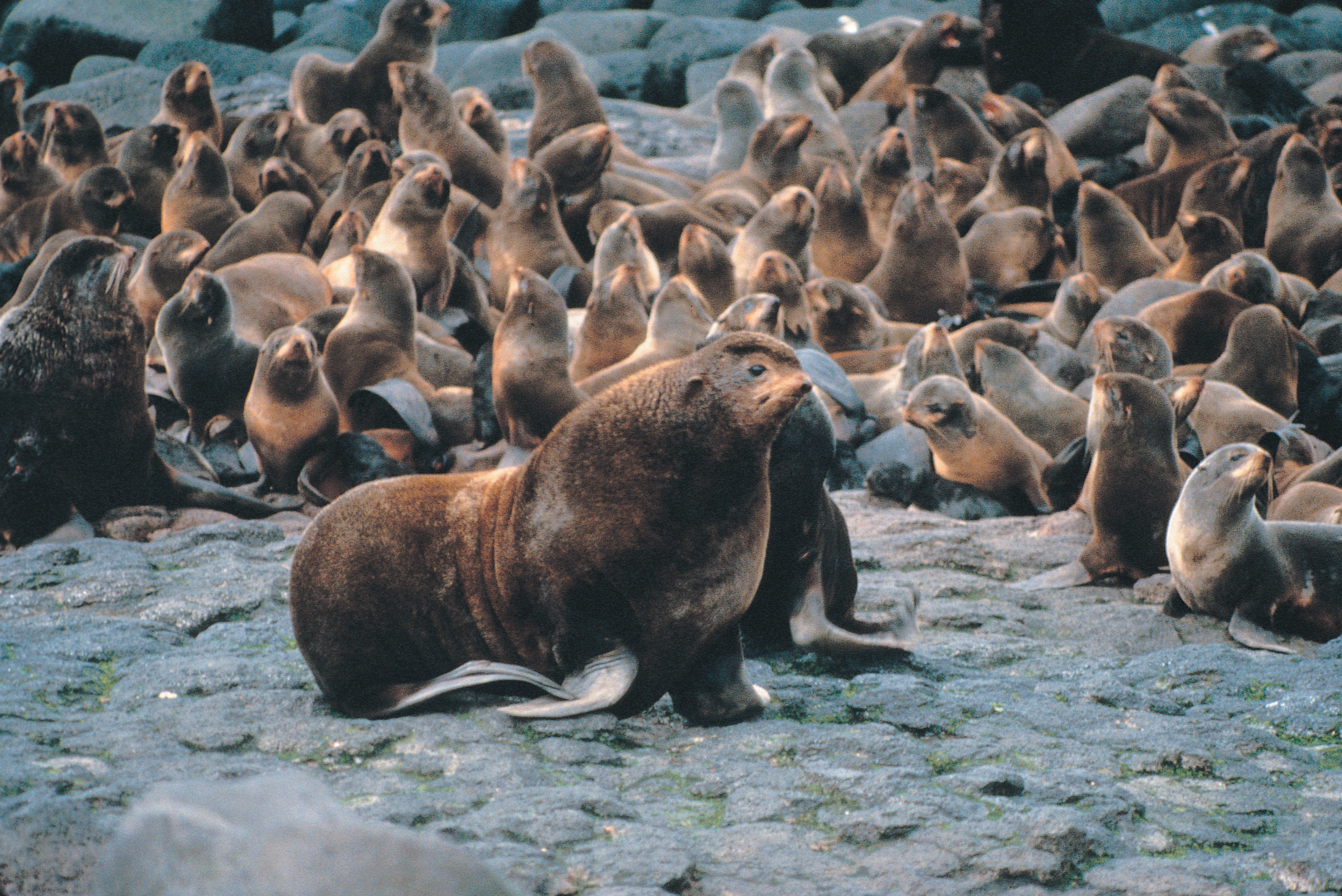
Bull and Harem

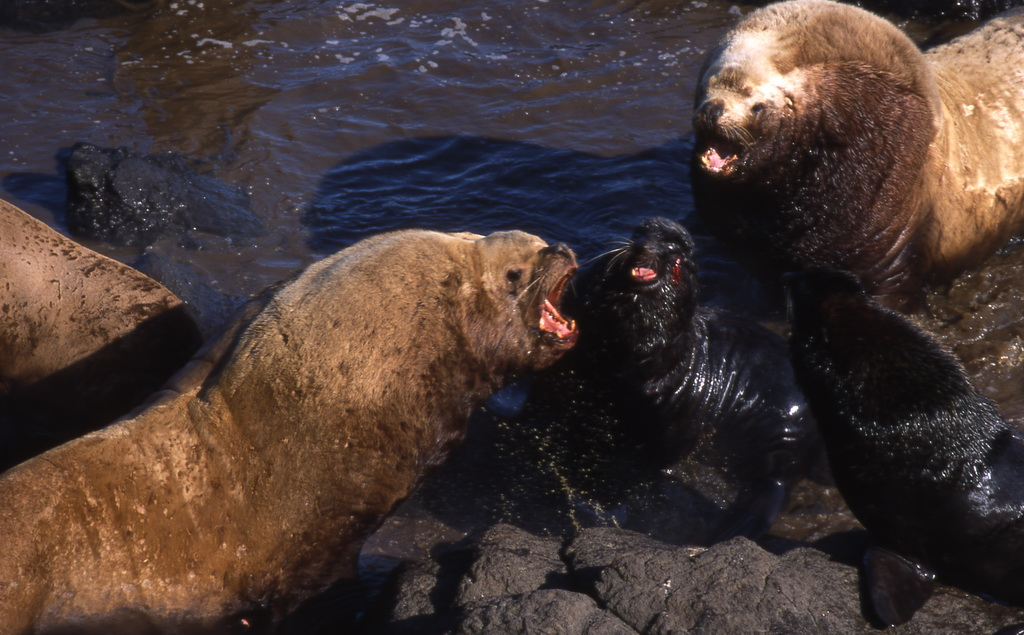
Fighting with Steller sea lions

Seals enter breeding rookeries in May. Generally, older males (10 years and older) return first and compete for prime breeding spots on the rookeries. They remain on the rookery, fasting throughout the duration of the breeding season. The females come somewhat later, and give birth shortly thereafter. Like all other otariids, northern fur seals are polygynous, with some males breeding with up to 50 females in a single breeding season. Unlike Steller sea lions, with which they share habitat and some breeding sites, northern fur seals are possessive of individual females in their harem, often aggressively competing with neighboring males for females. Deaths of females as a consequence of these conflicts have been recorded, though the males themselves are rarely seriously injured. Young males unable to acquire and maintain a territory of a harem typically aggregate in neighboring "haulouts", occasionally making incursions into the reproductive sections of the rookery in an attempt to displace an older male.

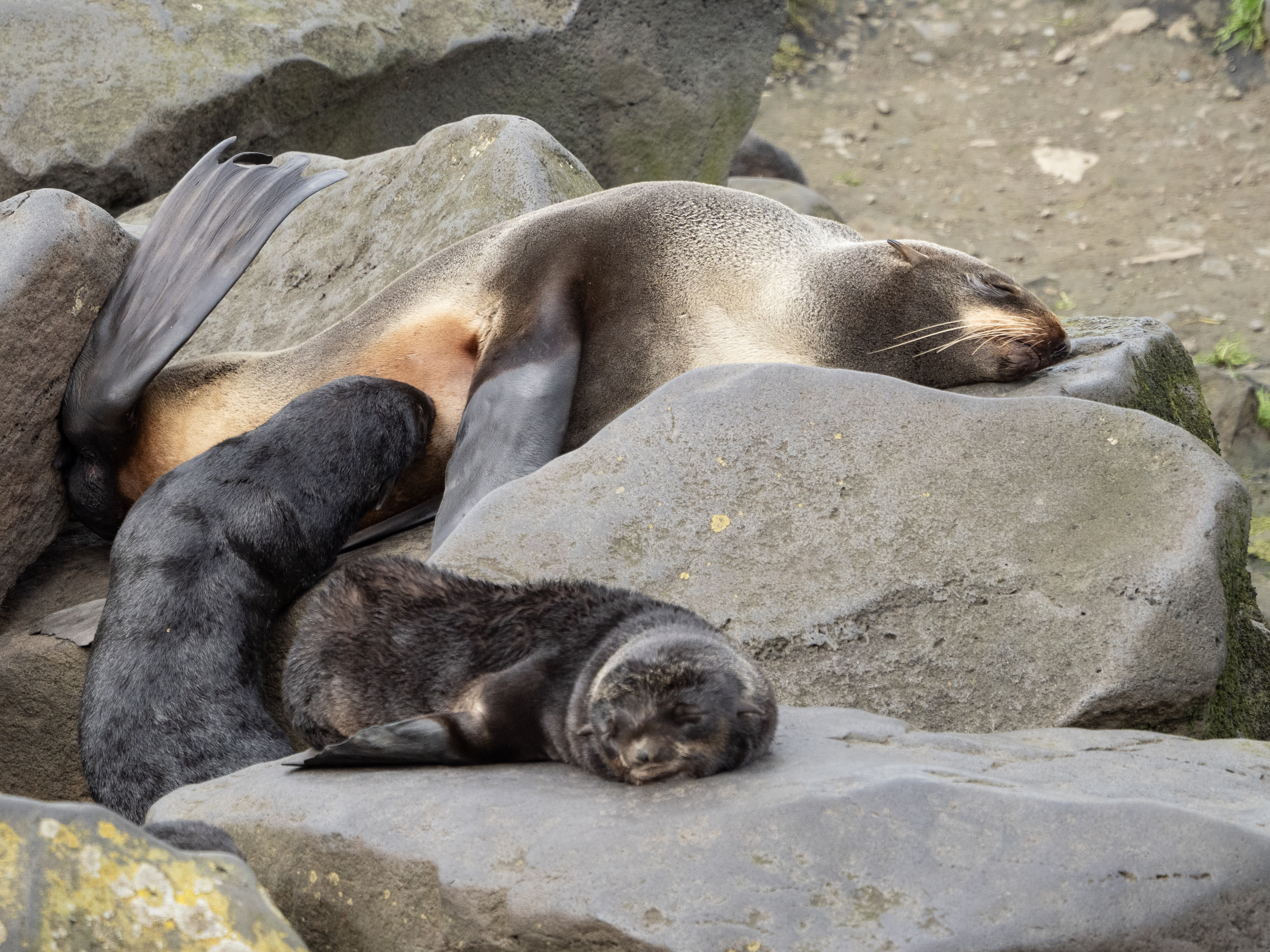
Northern fur seal pup nursing

After remaining with their pups for the first eight to ten days of their lives, females begin foraging trips lasting up to a week. These trips last for about four months before weaning, which happens abruptly, typically in October. Most of the animals on a rookery enter the water and disperse towards the end of November, typically migrating southward. Breeding site fidelity is generally high for fur seal females, though young males might disperse to other existing rookeries, or occasionally find new haulouts.

Peak mating occurs somewhat later than peak birthing from late June to late July. As with many other otariids, the fertilized egg undergoes delayed implantation: after the blastocyst stage occurs, development halts and implantation occurs four months after fertilization. In total, gestation lasts around a year, such that the pups born in a given summer are the product of the previous year's breeding cycle.

== Status ==
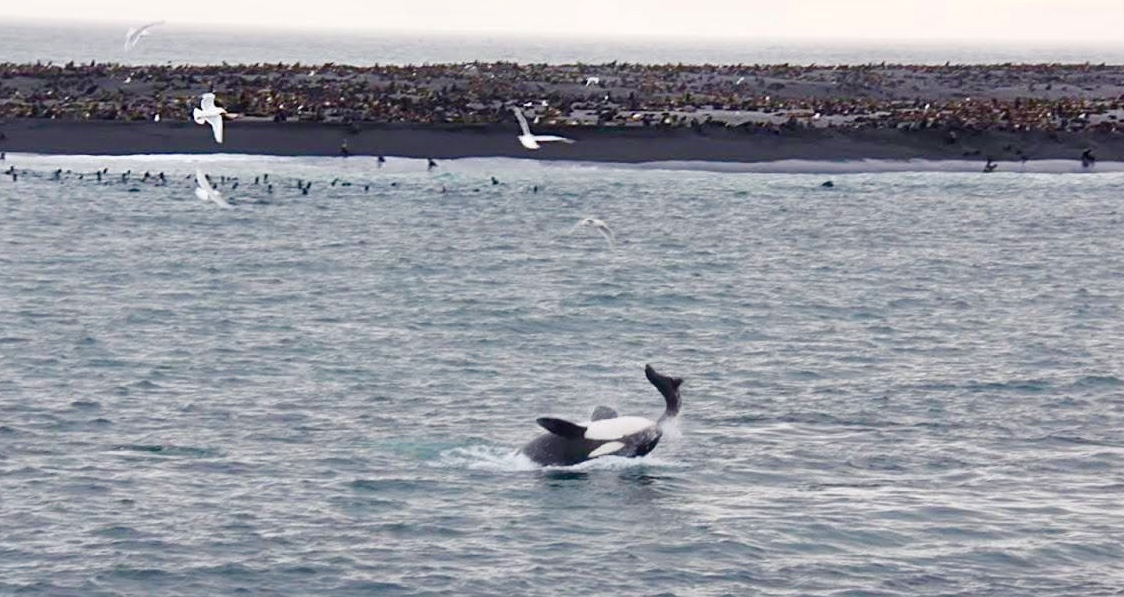
An orca feeding on a Northern fur seal

Concern about the status of fur seal populations has increased, particularly in the Pribilof Islands, where pup production has decreased about 50% since the 1970s, with a continuing drop of about 3.4% per year through 2018. This has caused them to be listed as "vulnerable" on the IUCN Red List, and more specifically, the Pribilof Islands / eastern Pacific stock is listed as "depleted" under the U.S. Marine Mammal Protection Act, though to date the species is not yet listed under the U.S. Endangered Species Act). Increasing concern about the species' status, particularly in the eastern part of its range, has led to an intensified research program into their behavioral and foraging ecology with an estimated decline 1.8% annually from 1999-2019. Possible causes for recent declines and lack of recovery are increased predation by killer whales, competition with fisheries, and climate change effects, nutritional limitation, but to date, no scientific consensus has been reached.

=== Fur trade ===
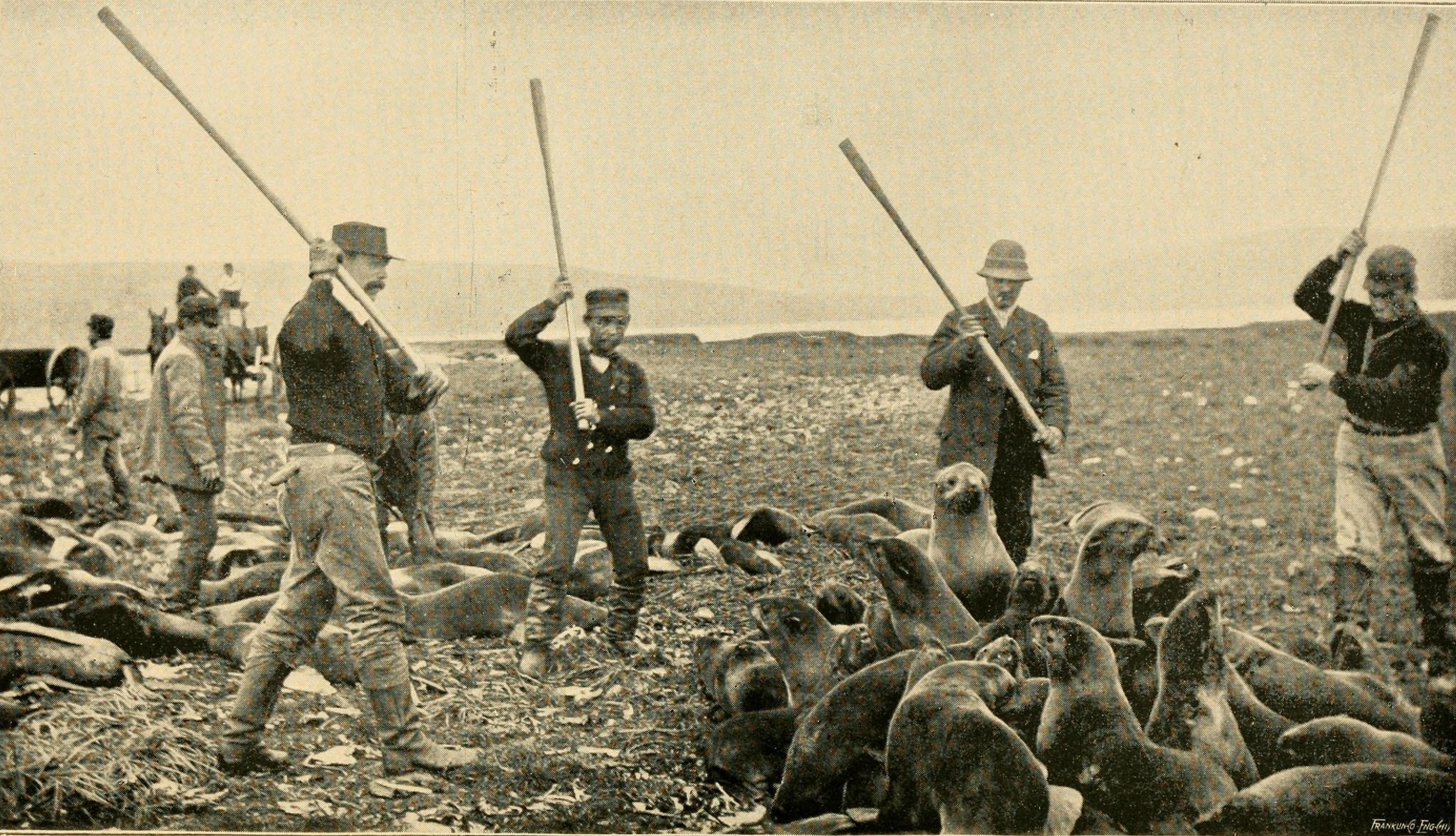
Men killing fur seals on Saint Paul Island, Alaska, 1890s

Northern fur seals have been a staple food of native northeast Asian and Alaska Native peoples for thousands of years. The arrival of Europeans to Kamchatka and Alaska in the 17th and 18th centuries, first from Russia and later from North America, was followed by a highly extractive commercial fur trade. The commercial fur trade was accelerated in 1786, when Gavriil Pribylov discovered St. George Island, a key rookery of the seals. An estimated 2.5 million seals were killed from 1786 to 1867. This trade led to a decline in fur seal numbers. Restrictions were first placed on fur seal harvest on the Pribilof Islands by the Russians in 1834. Shortly after the United States purchased Alaska from Russia in 1867, the U.S. Treasury was authorized to lease sealing privileges on the Pribilofs, which were granted somewhat liberally to the Alaska Commercial Company. From 1870 to 1909, pelagic sealing proceeded to take a significant toll on the fur seal population, such that the Pribilof population, historically numbering on the order of millions of individuals, reached a low of 216,000 animals in 1912.

Significant harvest was more or less arrested with the signing of the North Pacific Fur Seal Convention of 1911 by Great Britain (on behalf of Canada), Japan, Russia, and the United States. The Convention of 1911 remained in force until the onset of hostilities among the signatories during World War II, and is also notable as the first international treaty to address the conservation of wildlife. A successive convention was signed in 1957 and amended by a protocol in 1963. "The international convention was put into effect domestically by the Fur Seal Act of 1966 (Public Law 89-702)", said an Interior Department review of the history. Subsistence harvesting of northern fur seals is permitted on St. Paul and St. George Islands, Alaska, under regulated limits. A small harvest has also been reported in Russia, although its current status requires verification.

== See also ==
- Marine Mammal Center
- The White Seal, written by Rudyard Kipling
- https://www.marinebio.org/video/northern-fur-seals-videos/
