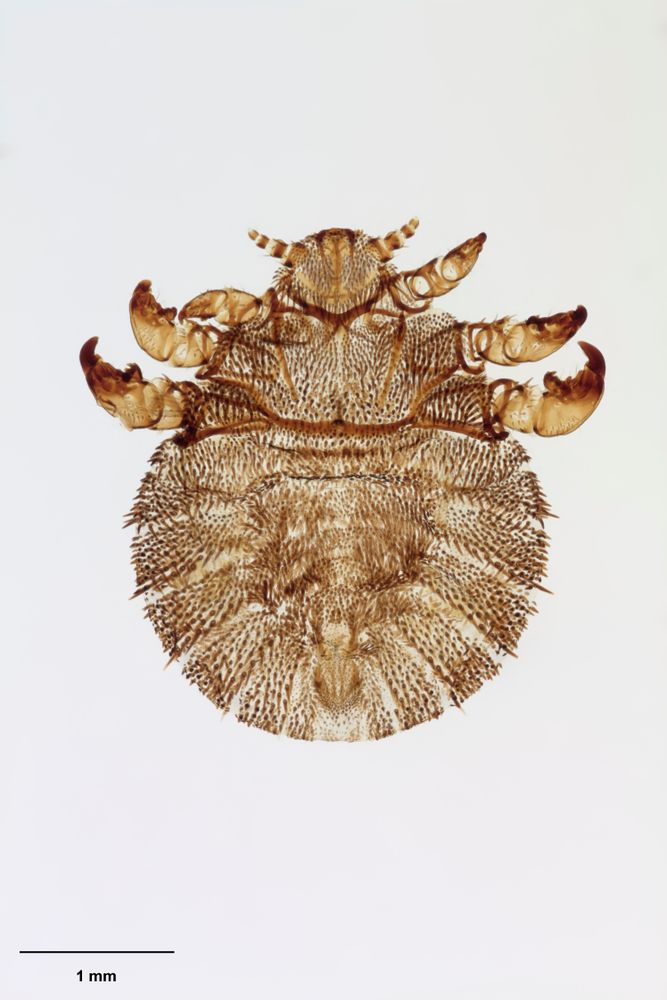
- from Macquarie Island

Scientific classification
- Kingdom: Animalia
- Phylum: Arthropoda
- Clade: Pancrustacea
- Class: Insecta
- Order: Psocodea
- Infraorder: Phthiraptera
- Family: Echinophthiriidae
- Genus: Lepidophthirus
- Species: L. macrorhini

Binomial name
- Lepidophthirus macrorhini Enderlein, 1904
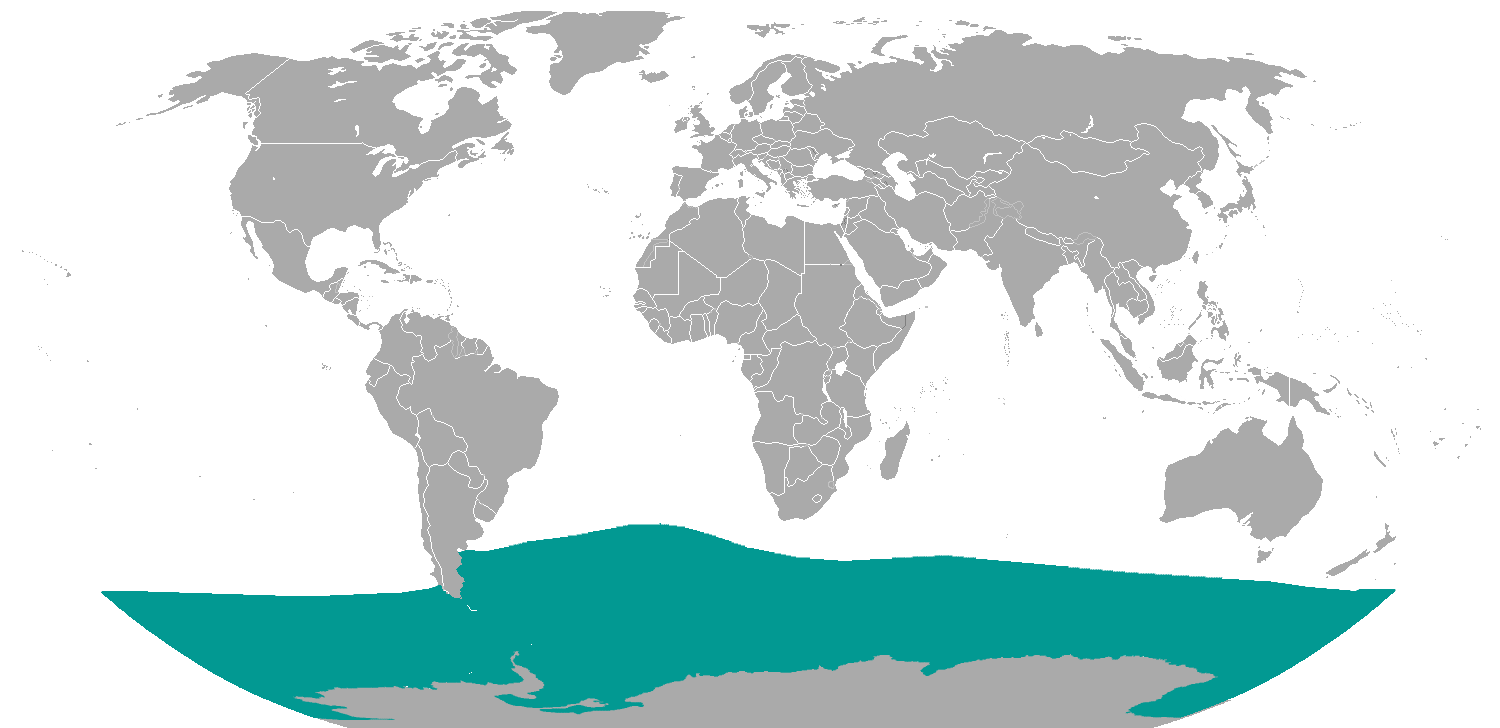
- Range of L. macrorhini's host

= Lepidophthirus macrorhini =

Species of seal louse

Lepidophthirus macrorhini is a species of seal lice (Echinophthiriidae), the type species of its genus Lepidophthirus. The primary hosts of these lice are the southern elephant seal, with the lice infesting their pelage; this seal species is one of the deepest diving mammals, surpassing all but two species of whales in their foraging dives. Thus, the lice infesting their hides needed to adapt alongside their hosts, and L. macrorhini is capable of enduring extreme hydrostatic pressures that they experience as the seal dives into the bathyal zone, over 2,000 metres (6,600 ft) below the ocean's surface. Despite the adults' resistance to pressure, the nymphs and especially the eggs must remain on dry land to survive, so the elephant seal lice reproduces during times when the elephant seals haul out for extended periods, such as during their breeding season.

== Description ==
In its 1904 initial description on the basis of 2 male and 21 female specimens recovered by one Dr. Werth, Enderlein compared the newly discovered louse to Echinophthirius lice which parasitize various seals such as Phoca spp. and Phocarctos hookeri. Despite their overall morphological similarity, the "scales" of this species is distinct from the spines of Echinophthirius; (Note: German: Oberseite des Thorax und besonders des Abdomens dicht mit breiten Schuppen besetzt ist, die Schmetterlingsschuppen sehr ähneln. Am nächsten steht diese form der Gattung Echinophthirius Giebel, die auf den Robben schmarotzt, besonders auf der Gattung Phoca) this difference lead him to establish the genus Lepidophthirus, with L. macrorhini (after a historical scientific name for southern elephant seals; Macrorhinus leoninus) being the type species by monotypy. A second species, L. piriformis, would later be described in 1966.

The head of this species is wider above, with the mouth positioned at the front of its underside. The species has no eyes, and its antennae have four segments. Its legs are robust, being short and squat. Lepidophthirus' scales densely occupy the top surface of the body, and there are no spines underneath this scale layer. Coloration tends to be brown with the sclerotized claws being darkest. There are two dark brown spots on top of the thorax surrounded by lighter regions; a pale and narrow longitudinal line runs between these regions.

Compared to other species in the family, L. macrorhini has a more rounded posterior region, a posterior projection of the coxae, an expanded rostrum, and a more robust first leg pair with a "well-developed" nail- or hook-like tarsal claw; in general, this species is larger and rounder-bodied than other Echinophtiriids.

The respiratory system of the louse consists of a well-developed tracheal tree with two main trunks which connect together within the abdomen's posterior. The spiracles, which are the respiratory system's orifices, protrude from the body wall which is unlike the flat or flush spiracles on human lice. The spiracles of seal lice have a closure system made up of heavily sclerotized cuticular plugs and cuticular rods along with their associated muscles; the rod acts as a piston which closes the spiracle when necessary. This mechanism is more elaborate and complex than other Anopluran lice. The tracheal and digestive systems, which are inherently hollow, are thought to collapse when exposed to high water pressure during dives.

== Distribution ==
As in other lice, L. macrorhini is an obligate ectoparasite; the types were recovered from a young male southern elephant seal which lived on the Kerguelen Islands, with subsequent studies confirming no other regular hosts (though one record exists of a Weddell seal infested by L. macrorhini), and that they infest elephant seals in the King George, Macquarie, and Elephant Islands as well. Genetic analysis comparing this species to other Echinopthiriid lice shows that they have comparatively higher population mutation rates, indicating a higher overall population size and heterozygosity; of the Echinopthirid host species studied, southern elephant seals have the greatest geographical distribution.

== Biology ==
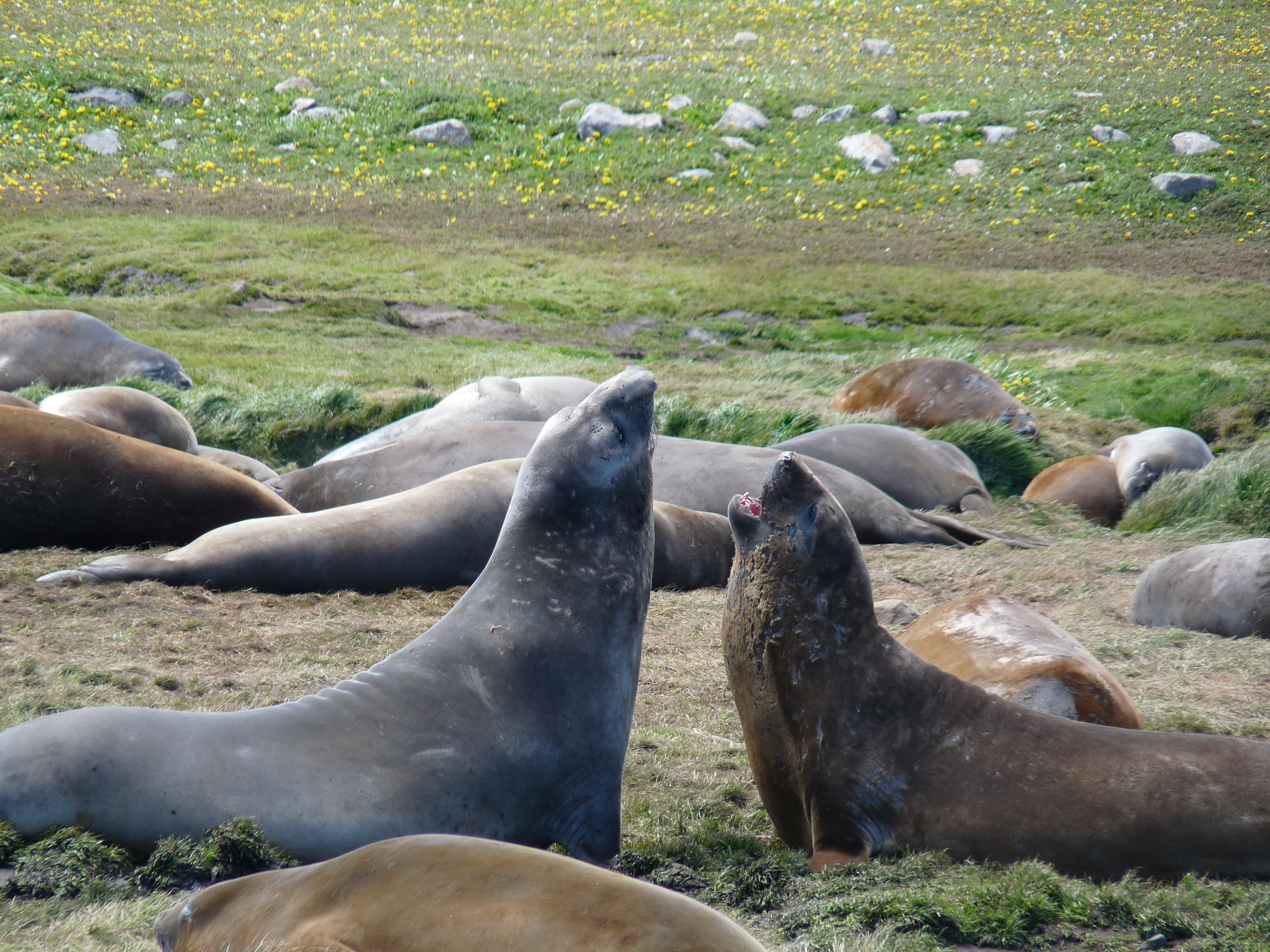
Southern elephant seals are the only host of Lepidophthirus macrorhini. This photo was taken in the Kerguelens.

Due to the habits of its host, Lepidophthirus macrorhini must be able to withstand periods of starkly contrasting environmental conditions; while breeding, they face weeks to months of hot or Antarctic summers. After they and their hosts complete reproduction, the louse must then adapt to the open ocean for the rest of the year, and survive diving trips which take them through the ocean's oxygen minimum zone. The authors of a 2025 paper believe that the "extraordinary challenges" that the elephant seal lice faces has few equivalents in the natural world; southern elephant seals are one of the deepest diving mammals, with the deepest record reaching depths of 2,388 metres (7,835 ft). Lepidophthirus macrorhini had to adapt with their host, developing a more rounded body shape to withstand extreme hydrostatic pressures of the seals' foraging dives; an experiment using a pressure chamber revealed that most adults and nymphs are capable of surviving hydrostatic pressures equivalent to the elephant seals' deepest recorded dive, with adults recovering from pressure exposure (by resuming movement) within a minute of exposure to ambient pressures, though nymphs may take longer to recover from exposure to higher pressures of 150–200 kg (330–440 lb) per 1 square centimetre (0.16 sq in). During the experiment's calibration, an adult was accidentally exposed to 450 kg (990 lb) per square centimeter for several minutes, which is equivalent to pressures from a deeper depth than the deepest record for the Cuvier's beaked whale; this individual louse survived the ordeal.

Outside of deep dives, regular immersion in the sea exposes the lice to other adverse conditions, including hypoxia, low ambient temperatures, and salinity. The lice consume more oxygen in air than in water, and this is consistent despite factoring in higher temperatures and life stage; by entering a state of quiescence which reduces metabolic activity, both adults and nymphs can obtain enough oxygen from seawater to survive their hosts' months-long foraging trips, though the mechanism for underwater respiration remains uncertain; respiration is performed either through oxygen diffusion through thinner cuticle sections, or the scales forming a "plastron" which traps a layer of air around the louse. Alternatively, they may rely on haemoglobins to store oxygen which would be released when the surrounding tissues are at critically low oxygen saturations. Whatever the case, the lice are able to survive for several days underwater.

The scales may provide protection against hydrostatic pressure and/or desiccation, in addition to the respiratory function explained above.

=== Feeding ===
As they feed on blood, the lice may be useful as a less invasive blood collection method while performing studies of isotopic patterns of carbon and nitrogen on elephant seals. An alphavirus dubbed as the Southern Elephant Seal (SES) virus was isolated from this louse species, clustering with the Semliki Forest Alphavirus group and being the first example of alphaviruses being transmitted by lice.

During the elephant seal's annual moulting period, the lice burrows into their first epidermal layer to avoid being sloughed off with the seal's shed skin. Additionally, the enlarged tarsal claws on the first leg-pair is thought to aid the lice in remaining attached during the moult. While burrowing into skin, the lice trigger an inflammatory response in the seals which may facilitate secondary infections. When removed from a host, the lice quickly perish due to desiccation.

=== Reproduction ===
L. macrorhini must reproduce on land as their eggs cannot survive underwater. Thus they time their breeding cycle with their host's own: L. macrorhini reproduces during periods where the elephant seals haul out, such as periods where the seal cows give birth, and individuals may also move hosts by crawling onto the pups. Eggs are often laid around the seals' umbilical region.

Nymphs lack the amount of scales present in adults, which has been hypothesized to be a reason for their longer recovery times after being subjected to high pressures.
