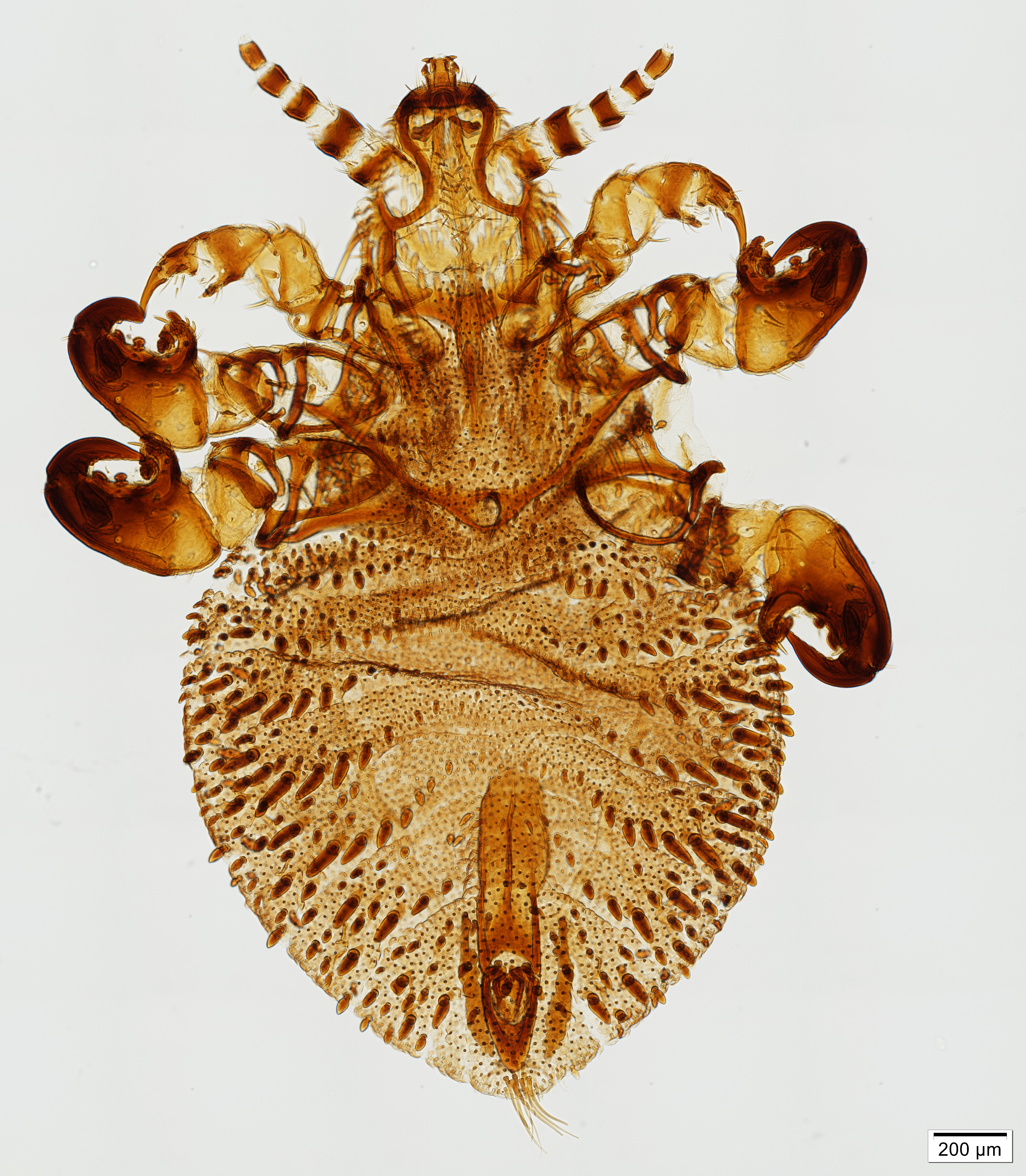
- Male A. trichechi specimen collected from walrus

Scientific classification
- Domain: Eukaryota
- Kingdom: Animalia
- Phylum: Arthropoda
- Class: Insecta
- Order: Psocodea
- Family: Echinophthiriidae
- Genus: Antarctophthirus; Enderlein, 1906

= Antarctophthirus =

Genus of lice

Antarctophthirus is a genus of lices belonging to the family Echinophthiriidae.

The species of this genus are found in arctic regions.

Species:

- Antarctophthirus callorhini (Osborn, 1899)
- Antarctophthirus carlinii Leonardi, Poljak, Carlini, Galliari, Bobinac, Santos, Marquez & Negrete, 2014
- Antarctophthirus lobodontis Enderlein, 1909
- Antarctophthirus mawsoni Harrison, 1937
- Antarctophthirus microchir (Trouessart & Neumann, 1888)
- Antarctophthirus ogmorhini Enderlein, 1906
- Antarctophthirus trichechi (Bohemann, 1865)
