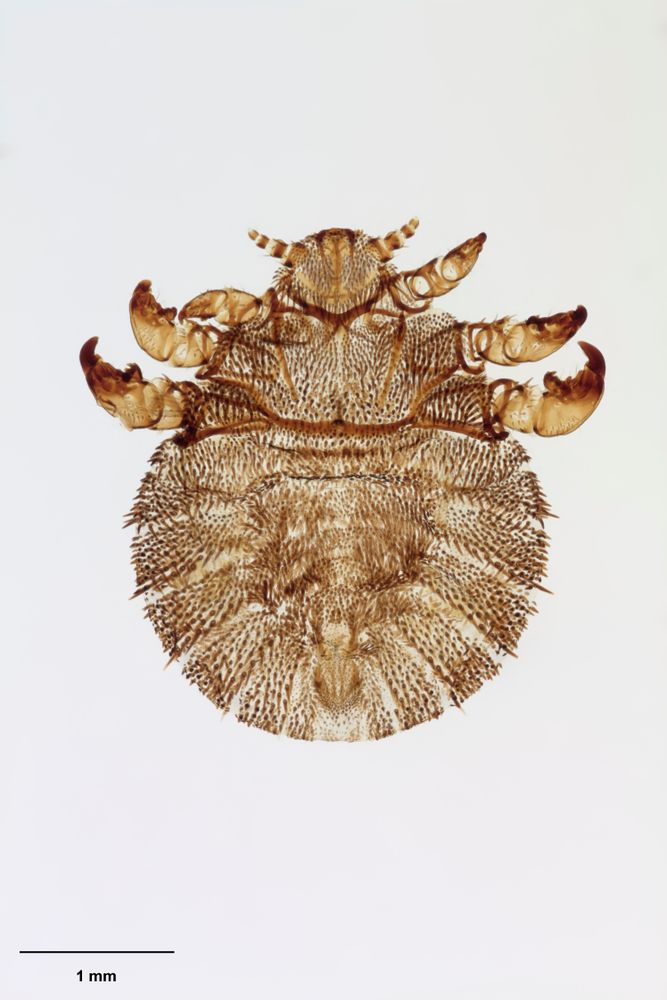
- Lepidophthirus macrorhini

Scientific classification
- Kingdom: Animalia
- Phylum: Arthropoda
- Clade: Pancrustacea
- Class: Insecta
- Order: Psocodea
- Infraorder: Phthiraptera
- Family: Echinophthiriidae
- Genus: Lepidophthirus; Enderlein, 1904

Type species
- Lepidophthirus macrorhini Enderlein, 1904

= Lepidophthirus =

Genus of seal lice

Lepidophthirus is a genus of lice which parasitizes southern seals (Monachinae). Two species are currently recognized:

== Species ==
- Lepidophthirus macrorhini Enderlein, 1904 (on southern elephant seals)
- Lepidophthirus piriformis Blagoveshtchensky, 1966 (on monk seals)
