= Antarctophthirus microchir =

Scientific classification
- Kingdom: Animalia
- Phylum: Arthropoda
- Clade: Pancrustacea
- Class: Insecta
- Order: Psocodea
- Infraorder: Phthiraptera
- Family: Echinophthiriidae
- Genus: Antarctophthirus
- Species: A. microchir

Binomial name
- Antarctophthirus microchir (Trouessart and Neumann, 1888)

Species of louse

Antarctophthirus microchir is a parasite found on pinnipeds (commonly known as sea lions and seals) and is an ectoparasite with the ability to live on the surface of mammals while tolerating submersion in salt water.

== Life cycle ==
Larval stages: Eggs and first larval stage are mainly found on seal pups, which have less contact with water during the beginning of their lives. It is shown that the parasitic eggs have less resistance to water.

Nymph: Legs and spine are developed.

Adult: Exterior structures are developed. The haustellum functions as a suction and provides stability of the lice on mammal surface.

All stages of A. microchir were found on aquatic mammals, suggesting the lice complete the entire life cycle within the host.

== Main structures ==
- Chaetotaxy: Spines, scales, and hairs. Spines typically have grooves.
- Spiracles: Serve as a clear membrane for the lice.
- Legs: Hinge and middle legs are larger than forelegs. Often used to hold on to hairs of host.
- Head: The head is eyeless. However, it possesses a haustellum along with 8 hooks.
- Antennae : Consists of 5 segments. The terminal segment has sensorial organs.
- Abdomen: Membranous. More rounded in male.
