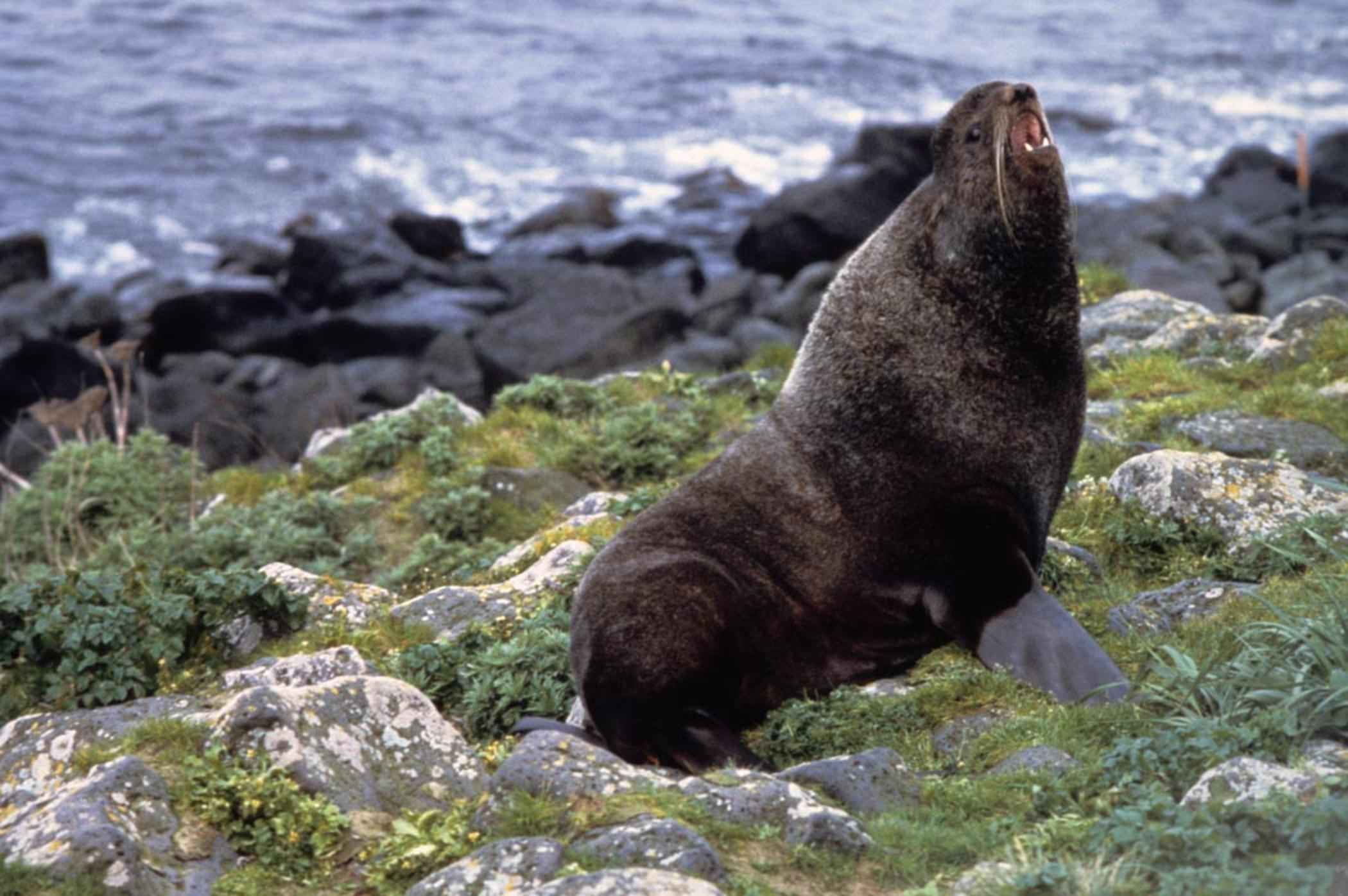
- Northern fur seal (Callorhinus ursinus)
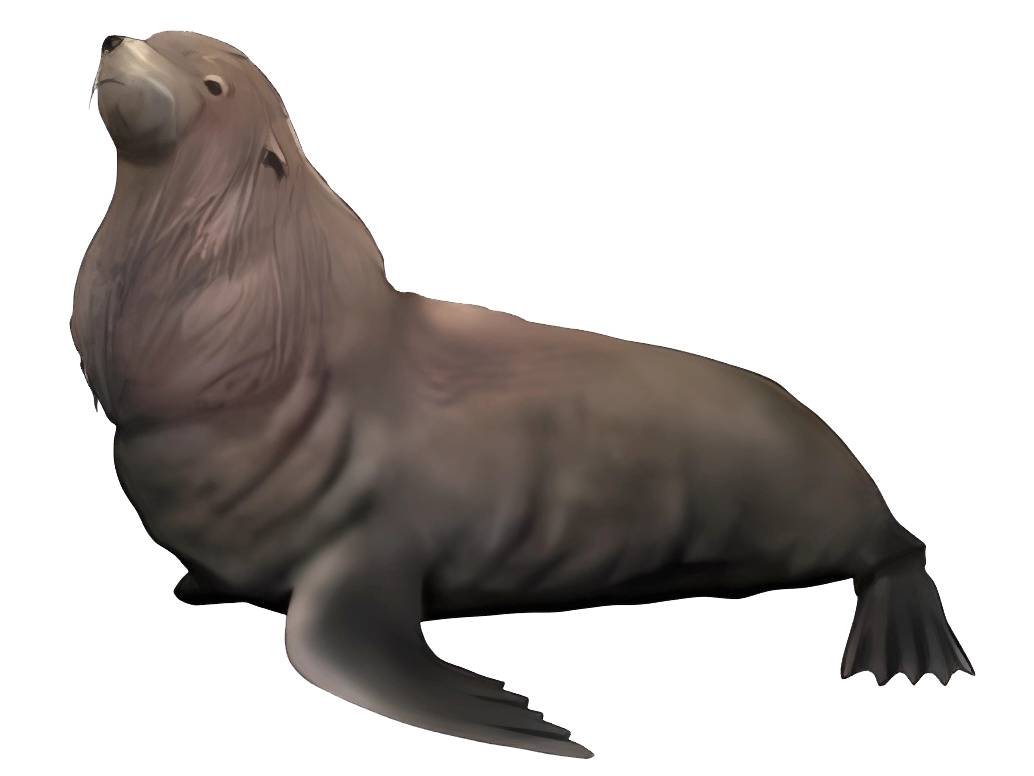
- †Callorhinus gilmorei

Scientific classification
- Kingdom: Animalia
- Phylum: Chordata
- Class: Mammalia
- Order: Carnivora
- Parvorder: Pinnipedia
- Family: Otariidae
- Subfamily: Arctocephalinae
- Genus: Callorhinus; Gray, 1859

Type species
- Arctocephalus ursinus Gray, 1859

Species
- Callorhinus ursinus; †Callorhinus gilmorei

= Callorhinus =

Callorhinus Temporal range: Pliocene - Recent

Genus of mammals

Callorhinus is a genus of fur seal. It contains the living northern fur seal (Callorhinus ursinus) as well as the extinct Callorhinus gilmorei and an unnamed species, both from the Pliocene and very beginning of the Pleistocene.

The scientific name of the northern fur seal is Callorhinus ursinus. That second part, ursinus, comes from Latin and means "like a bear." People gave them this name because the males are large and strong, with thick fur that makes them resemble bears when they emerge from the water. Therefore, referring to them as "sea bears" is a nickname derived from their appearance and scientific name.

Callorhinus may be a sister genus to the extinct giant otariid, Thalassoleon.
