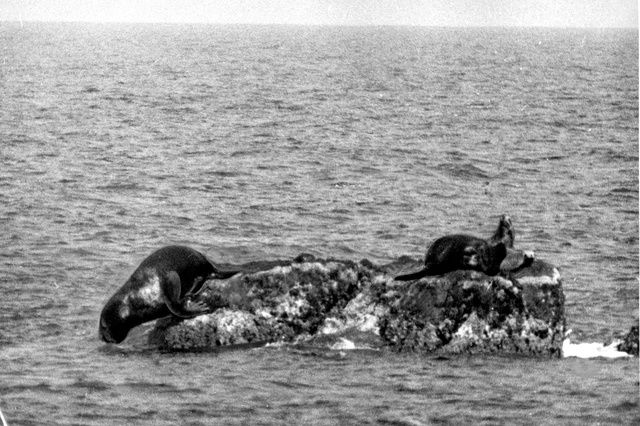
- Zalophus japonicus at Liancourt Rocks in 1934

Conservation status
- Extinct (1970s) (IUCN 3.1)

Scientific classification
- Kingdom: Animalia
- Phylum: Chordata
- Class: Mammalia
- Infraclass: Placentalia
- Order: Carnivora
- Parvorder: Pinnipedia
- Family: Otariidae
- Genus: Zalophus
- Species: †Z. japonicus

Binomial name
- †Zalophus japonicus (Peters, 1866)

Synonyms
- Z. lobatus Jentink, 1892

= Japanese sea lion =

Extinct species of sea lion from East Asia

The Japanese sea lion (Zalophus japonicus) (Japanese: ニホンアシカ, romanized: Nihon ashika, Korean: 강치, 바다사자) was an aquatic mammal that became extinct in the 1970s. It was considered to be a subspecies of the related California sea lion (Z. californianus) until 2003. They inhabited the western North Pacific and its marginal seas including the Sea of Okhotsk and the Sea of Japan, especially around the coastal areas of the Japanese archipelago and the Korean Peninsula. They generally bred on sandy beaches which were open and flat, but sometimes in rocky areas. They were hunted commercially in the 1900s, leading to their extinction.

== Taxonomy ==
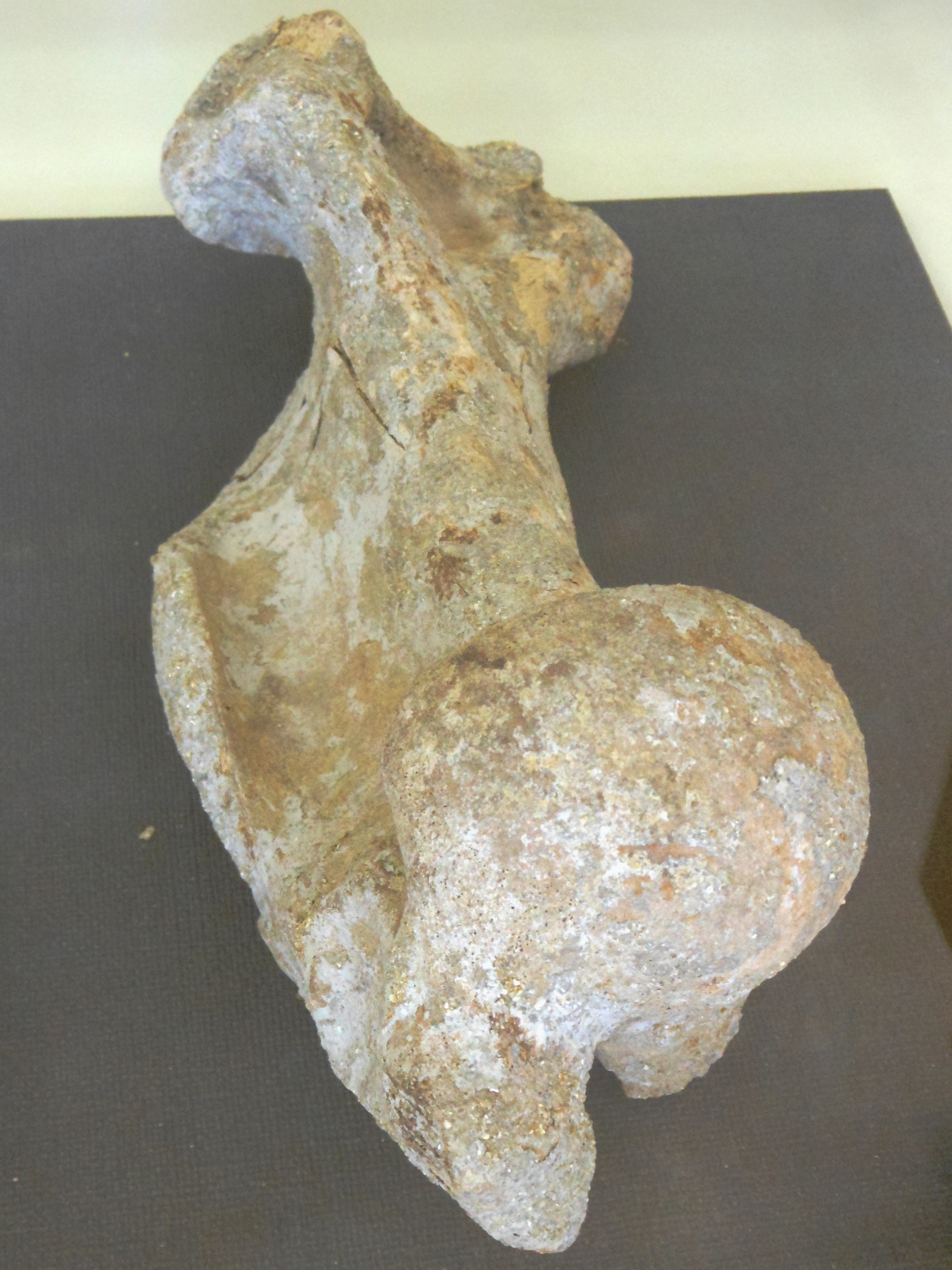
8,000-year-old sea lion fossil

Prior to 2003, it was considered to be a subspecies of California sea lion as Zalophus californianus japonicus. However, it was subsequently reclassified as a separate species. DNA analysis in 2007 estimated that the divergence point between the two sea lions took place around 2 million years ago (mya) in the early Pleistocene.

Several taxidermied specimens can be found in Japan and in the National Museum of Natural History, Leiden, the Netherlands, bought by Philipp Franz von Siebold. The British Museum possesses a pelt and four skull specimens.

== Description ==
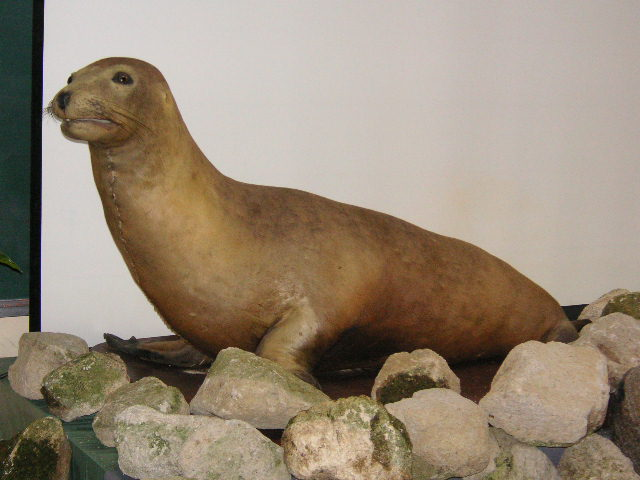
Taxidermied specimen, Tennōji Zoo, Osaka, Japan

Male Japanese sea lions were dark grey, reaching lengths of 2.3 to 2.5 metres (7.5 to 8.2 ft) and weighed about 450 to 560 kilograms (990 to 1,230 lb). Females were significantly smaller at 1.64 to 1.8 metres (5.4 to 5.9 ft) long and weighed about 120 kilograms (260 lb) with a lighter grey colour than the males.

== Distribution and habitat ==
Japanese sea lions were found along the northwest Pacific coastline, specifically in Japan, Korea, southern Kamchatka Peninsula, and the Sakhalin Island. However, they may not have existed in Kamchatka, with their northernmost range extending only to the Kuril Islands. Sightings of individual Japanese sea lions still persist in Korea, but these are probably misidentified Steller's sea lions (Eumetopias jubatus). The only reliable report from Kamchatka may have been of a single individual shot at Moneron Island in 1949.

Old Korean accounts also describe that the sea lion and spotted seal (Phoca largha) were found in a broad area containing the BoHai Sea, the Yellow Sea, and the Sea of Japan. Many places along the Japanese coastline are named after sea lions or seals, such as Ashika-iwa (海驢岩 or 海鹿岩, sea lion rock), Ashika-jima (海獺島 or 海鹿島, sea lion island), and Cape Inubō (犬吠埼, dog-barking point). Bones of Z. japonicus dating to 3500–2000 BC were found in the Shell Mound in Dongsam-dong, Busan. Genetic evidence confirms the former presence of Z. japonicus on the Liancourt rocks.

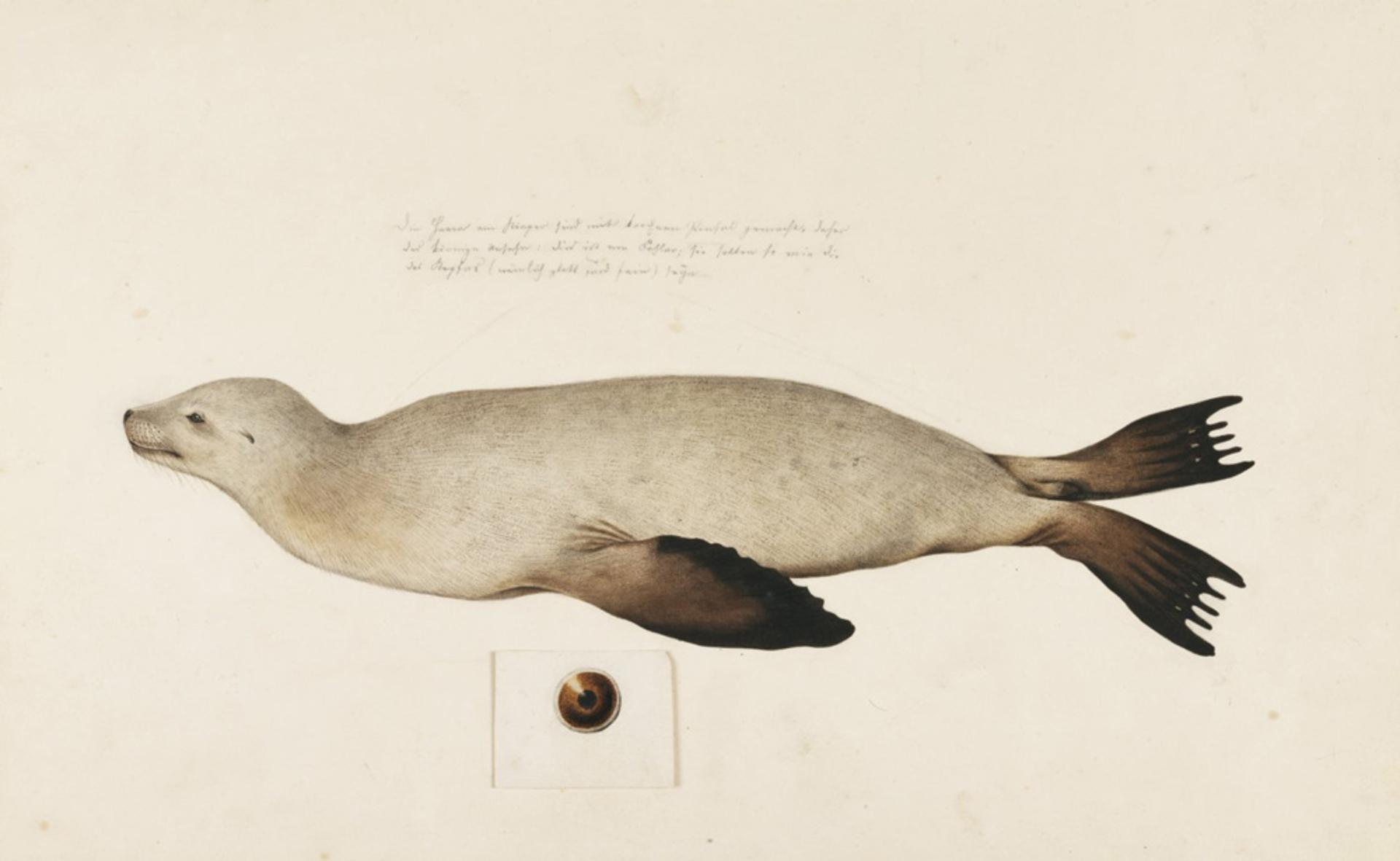
Illustration of a Japanese sea lion in a swimming position

They usually resided on flat, open, and sandy beaches, but rarely in rocky areas. Their preference was to rest in caves.

== Exploitation and extinction ==
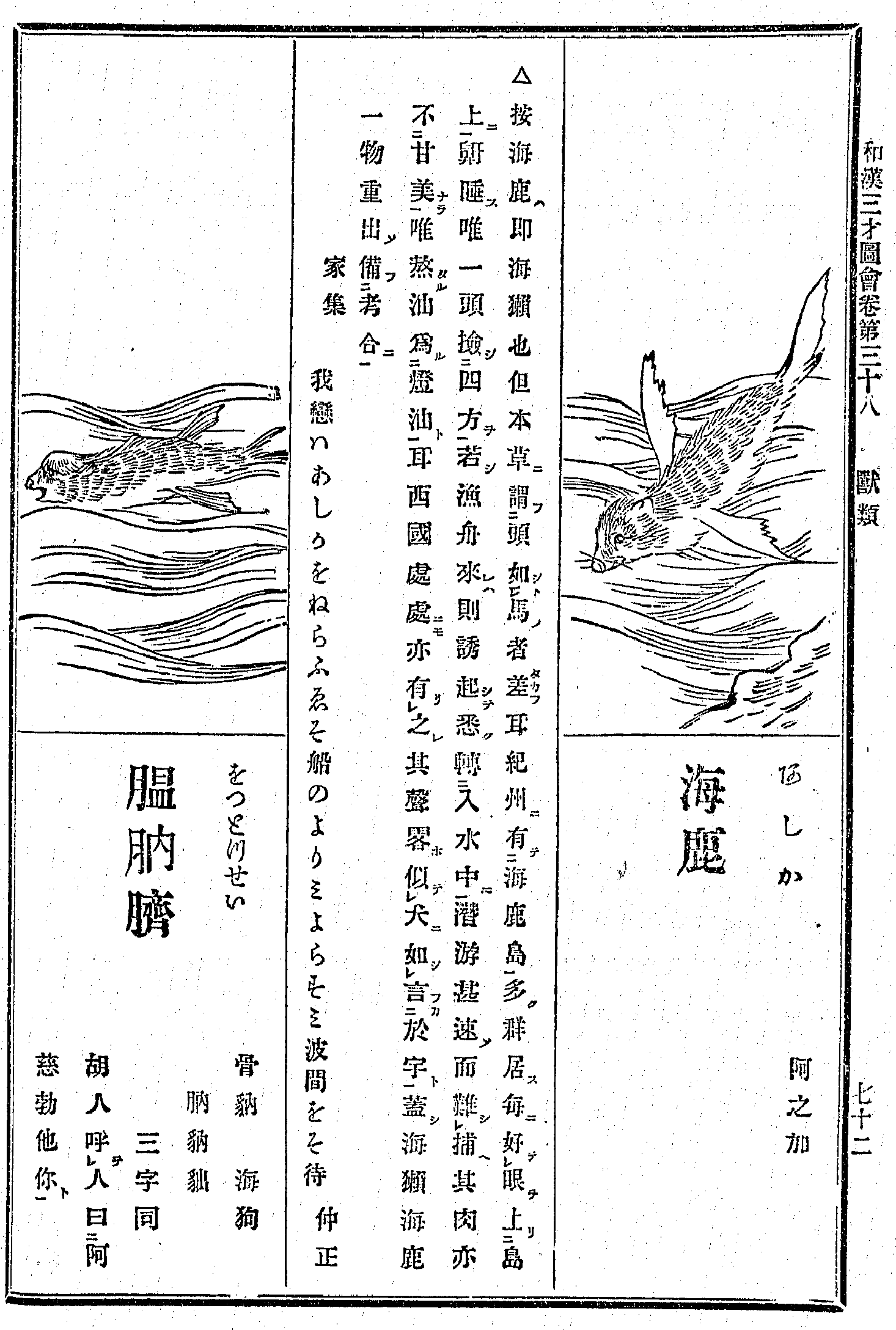
Sea lion (right) and fur seal, Wakan Sansai Zue (around 1712)

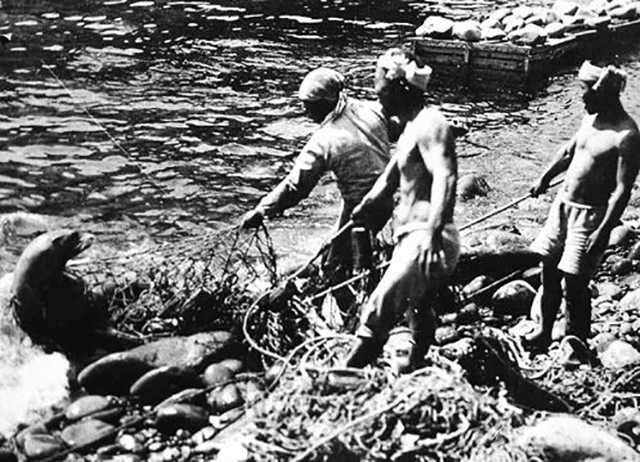
Sealing at Liancourt Rocks by Japanese fishermen in 1934

Many bones of the Japanese sea lion have been excavated from shell middens from the Jōmon period in Japan. An 18th-century encyclopedia, Wakan Sansai Zue, describes that the meat was not tasty and they were only used to render oil for oil lamps. Valuable oil was extracted from the skin, its internal organs were used to make expensive medicine, and its whiskers and skin were used as pipe cleaners and leather goods, respectively. At the turn of the 20th century, they were captured for use in circuses.

Harvest records from Japanese commercial fishermen in the early 1900s show that as many as 3,200 sea lions were harvested at the turn of the century, and overhunting caused harvest numbers to fall drastically to 300 sea lions by 1915 and to a few dozen sea lions by the 1930s. Japanese commercial harvest of Japanese sea lions ended in the 1940s when the species became virtually extinct. In total, Japanese trawlers harvested as many as 16,500 sea lions, enough to cause their extinction. Submarine warfare during World War II is also believed to have contributed to their habitat destruction. The last population survey dates from the 1950s and reported a population of only 50 to 60 animals on the Liancourt Rocks. The most recent sightings of Z. japonicus are from the 1970s, with the last confirmed record being a juvenile specimen captured in 1974 off the coast of Rebun Island, northern Hokkaido. There were a few unconfirmed sightings in 1983 and 1985. In any case, it was one of the most recent marine mammal extinctions to occur, alongside the Caribbean monk seal which went extinct at around the same time.

== Attempted rewilding ==
In 2007, the South Korean Ministry of Environment announced that South Korea, North Korea, Russia, and China will collaborate on bringing back sea lions to the Sea of Japan, starting with a search for any Japanese sea lions that might still be alive. The National Institute of Environmental Research of South Korea was commissioned to conduct feasibility research for this project. If the animal cannot be found, the South Korean government plans to relocate California sea lions from the United States. The South Korean Ministry of Environment supports the effort because of the symbolism, national concern, the restoration of the ecological system, and possible ecotourism.

== Post-extinction claimed sightings or vagrant records ==
Sightings of single sea lions of unclear identities have been reported at Iwami, Tottori in July 2003, and on Koshikijima Islands in March 2016. Both animals were positively identified as Otariidae based on photographs, but their identities are unclear.
