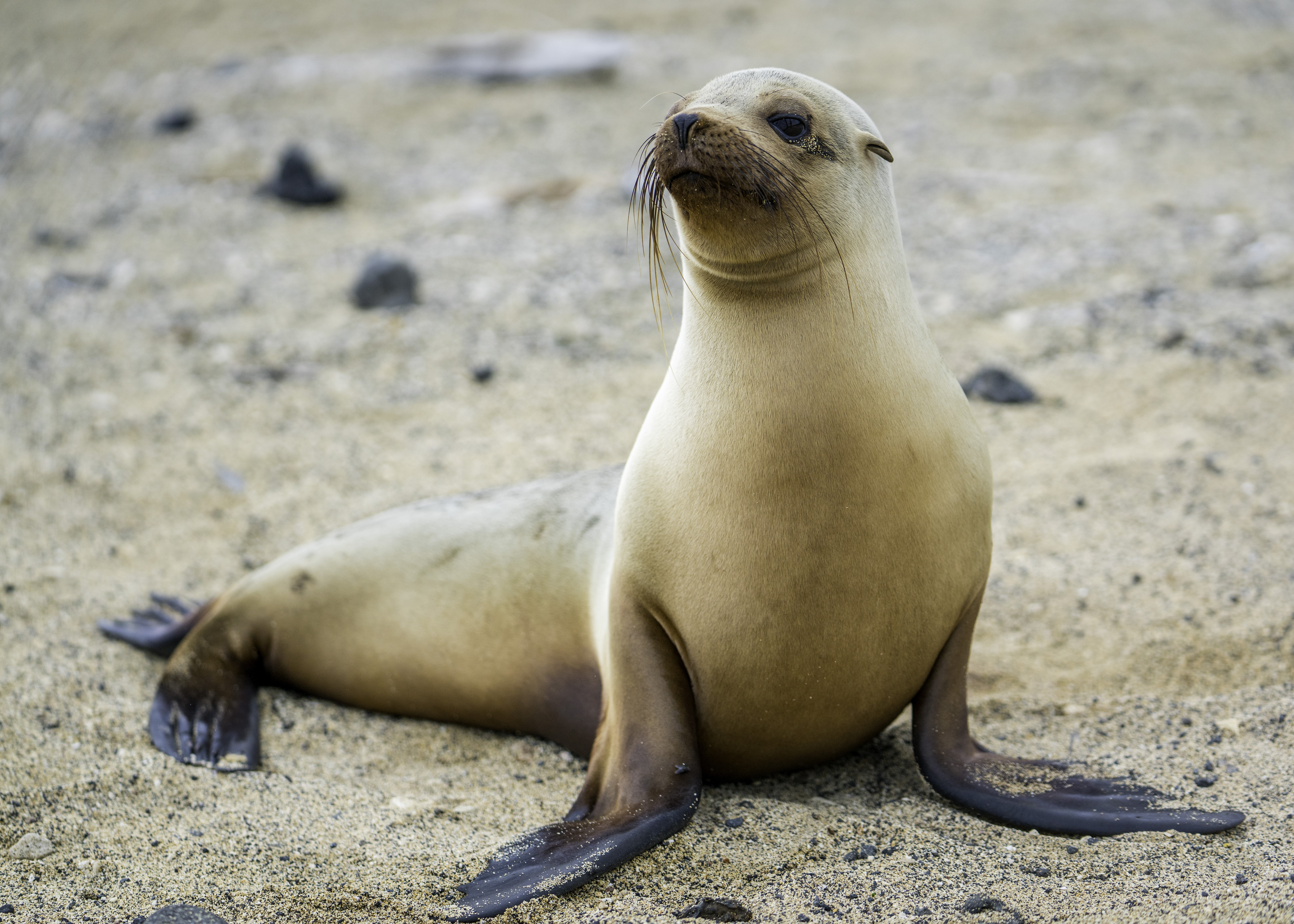
- Female
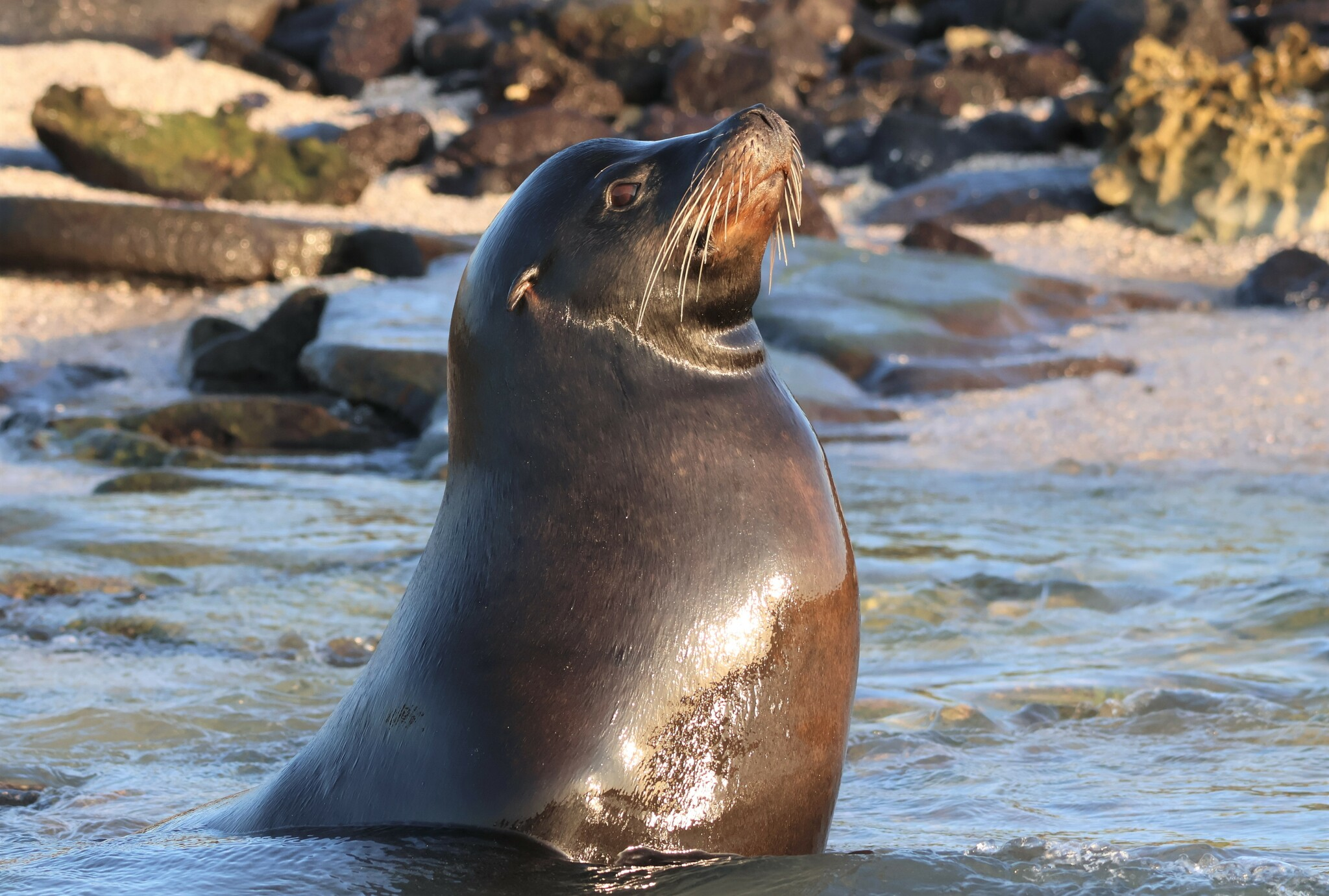
- Male

Conservation status
- Endangered (IUCN 3.1)

Scientific classification
- Kingdom: Animalia
- Phylum: Chordata
- Class: Mammalia
- Order: Carnivora
- Parvorder: Pinnipedia
- Family: Otariidae
- Genus: Zalophus
- Species: Z. wollebaeki

Binomial name
- Zalophus wollebaeki Sivertsen, 1953
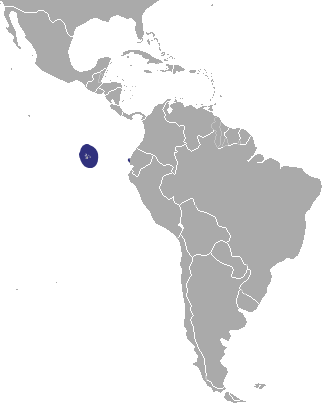
- Galápagos sea lion range

= Galápagos sea lion =

Species of carnivore

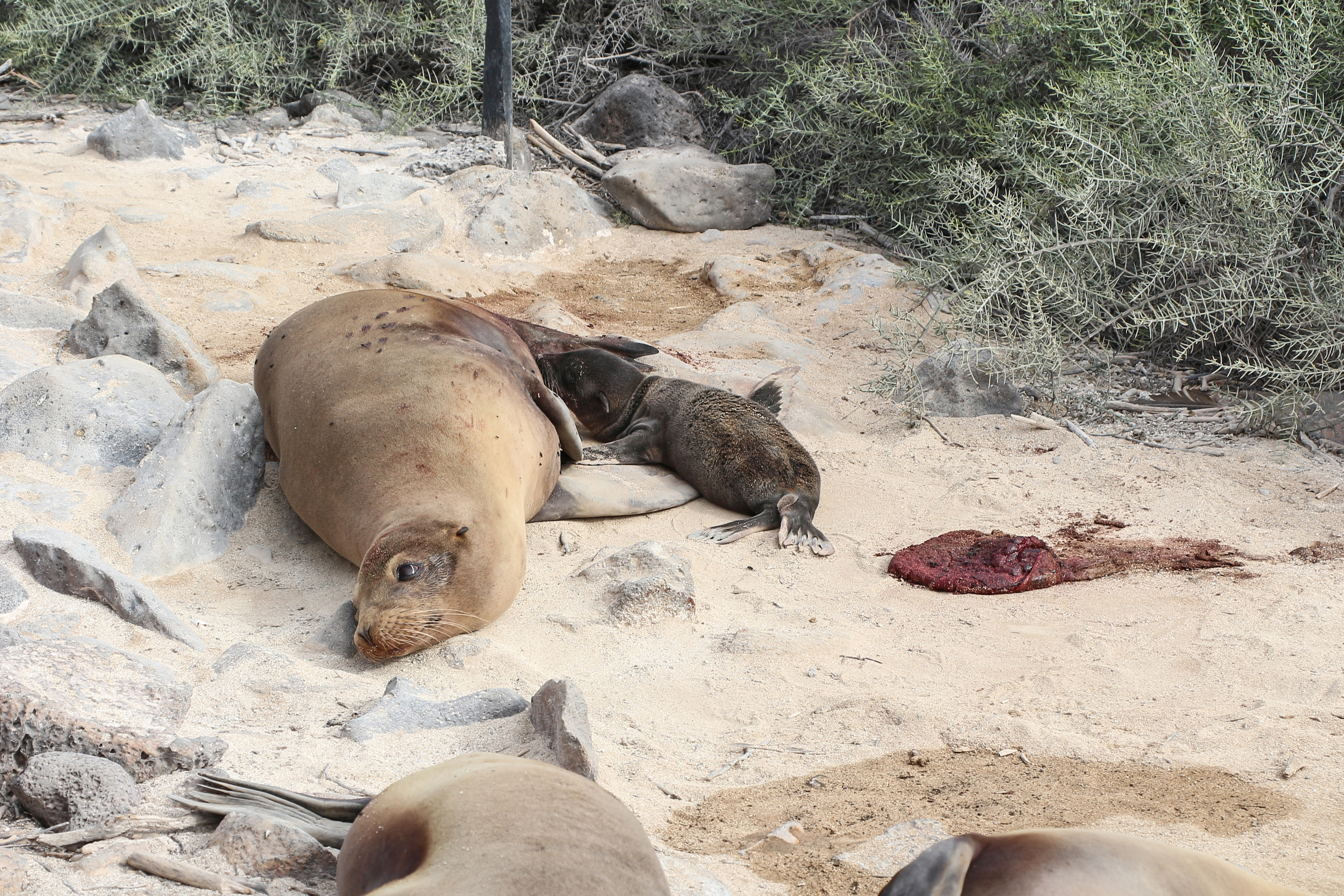
Female with pup

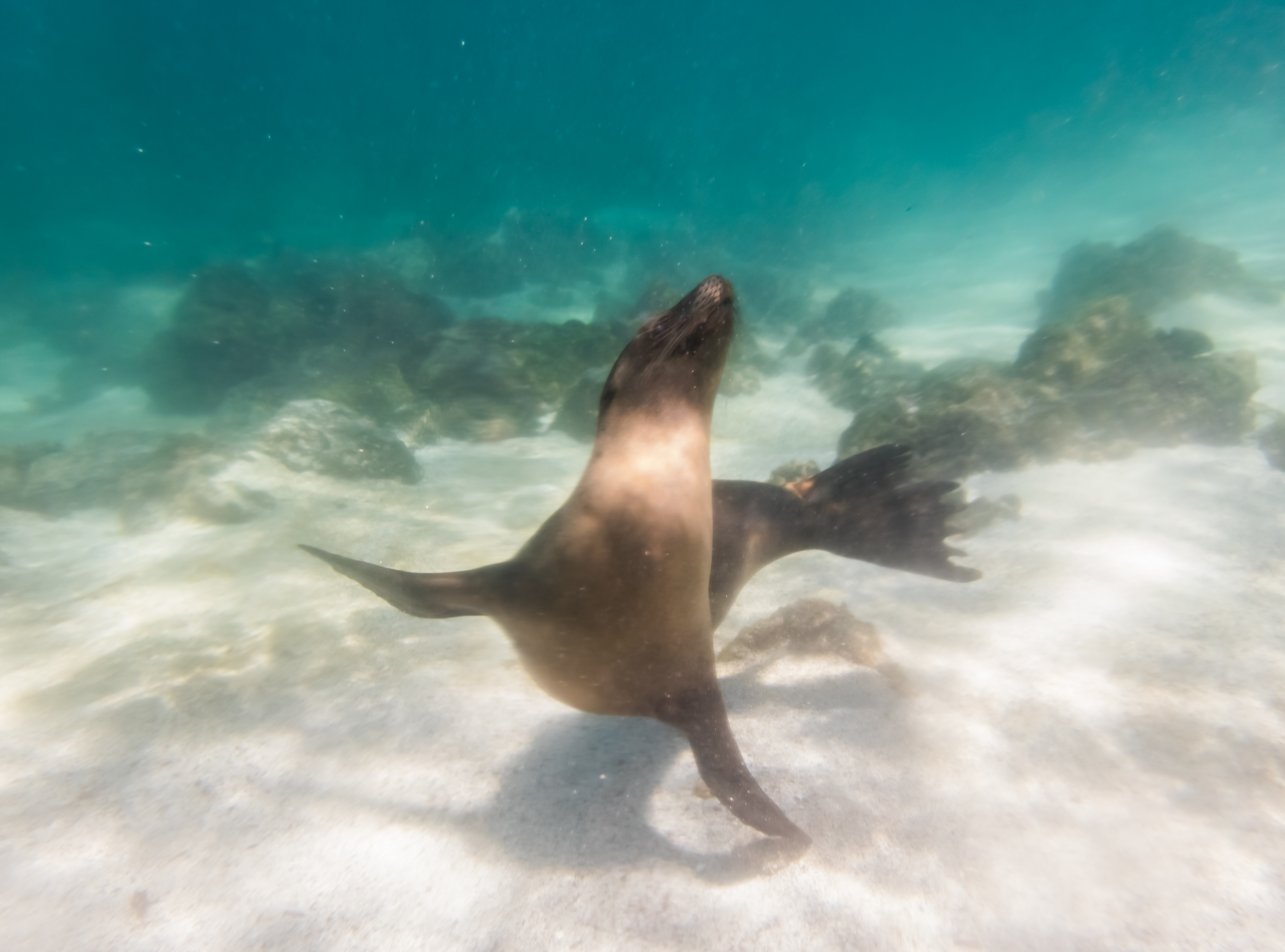
A Galápagos sea lion underwater off the coast of San Cristóbal

The Galápagos sea lion (Zalophus wollebaeki) is a species of sea lion that lives and breeds on the Galápagos Islands and, in smaller numbers, on Isla de la Plata (Ecuador). They are the smallest sea lion species.

== Taxonomy ==
This species was first described by Erling Sivertsen in 1953. It has been considered a subspecies of Zalophus californianus (called Z. c. wollebaeki) by many authors. But genetic data supports Z. wollebaeki as a separate species. The species belongs to the family Otariidae and genus Zalophus.

== Physical characteristics ==
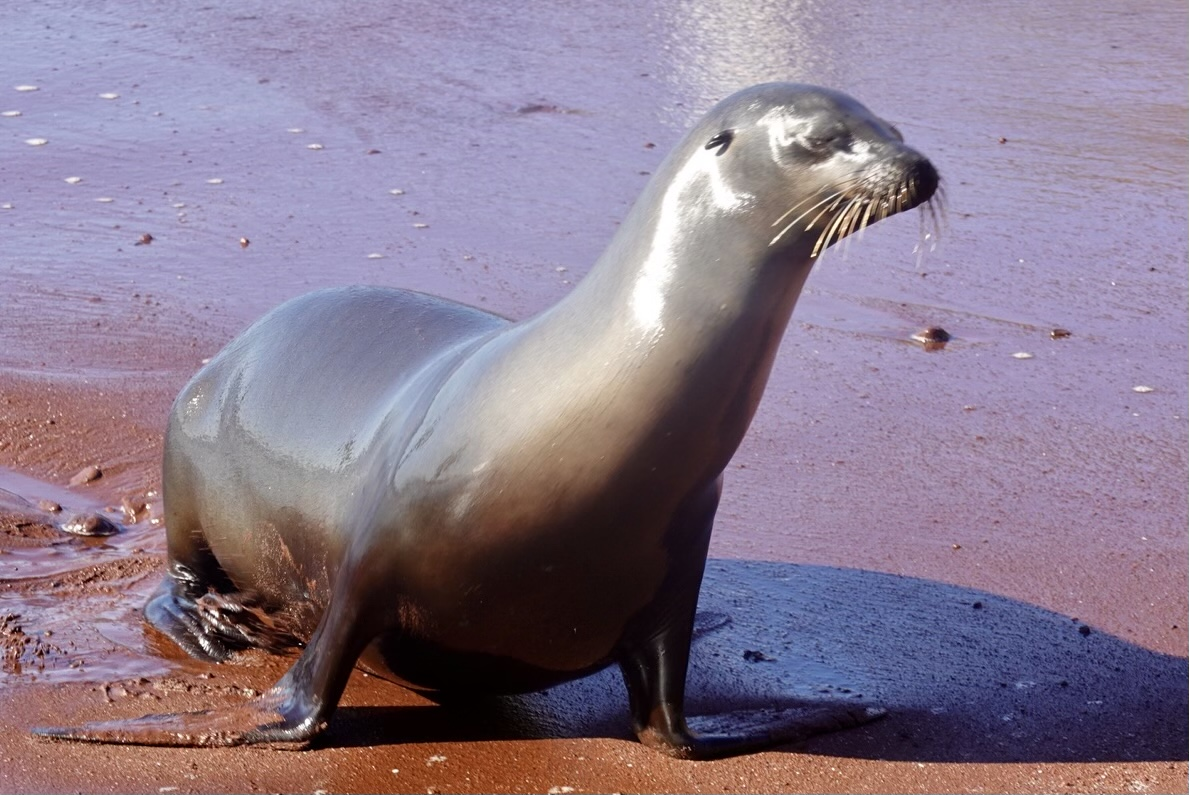
Standing on Land at Rábida Island

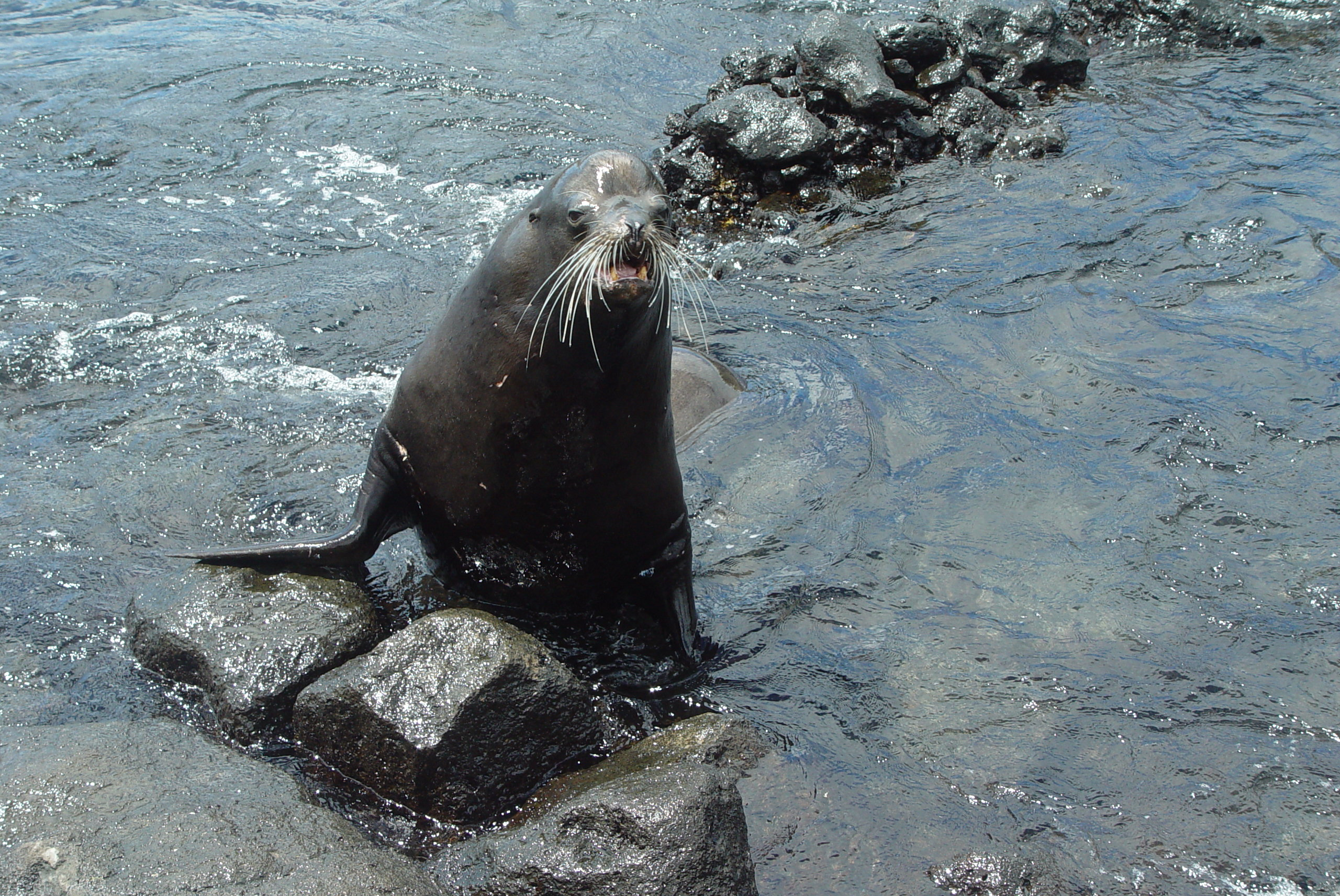
Male, at San Cristóbal Island

Slightly smaller than their Californian congener, Galápagos sea lions range from 1.5 to 2.5 m (4.9 to 8.2 ft) in length and weigh between 50 and 400 kg (110 and 880 lb), with the males averaging larger than females. Sexual dimorphism plays a small role in the physical characteristics and size of Galápagos sea lions, as males also tend to have a thicker, more robust neck, chest, and shoulders in comparison to their slender abdomen, whereas females have a longer, more slender neck and thick torso. The male's sagittal crest enlarges when he reaches sexual maturity, forming a small, characteristic bump-like projection on his forehead. Adult females and juveniles lack this trait and have a nearly flat head and little or no forehead. Galápagos sea lions, compared to California sea lions, have a slightly smaller sagittal crest and a shorter muzzle.

Both male and female sea lions have a pointy, whiskered nose and long, narrow muzzle. Young pups are almost dog-like in profile. Another characteristic that defines the sea lion is the pinnae of the external ears, which distinguish them from seals. The foreflippers have a short fur extending from the wrist to the middle of the dorsal fin surface, but other than that, the flippers are covered in black, leathery skin. Curving posteriorly, the first digit of the flipper is the largest, giving it a swept-back look. At the end of each digit is a claw, usually reduced to a vestigial nodule that rarely emerges above the skin. Although clumsy on land, sea lions are agile in water. With their streamlined bodies and flipper-like feet, they easily propel themselves through crashing surf and sharp coastal rocks. They also have the ability to control their flippers independently and thus change directions with ease.

When wet, sea lions are a shade of dark brown, but once dry, their color varies greatly. The females tend to be a lighter shade than the males and the pups a chestnut brown. Pups are born with a longer, brownish-black lanugo that gradually fades to brown within the first five months of life. At this time, they undergo their first molt, resulting in their adult coat. The age of maturity for Galápagos sea lions is about 4–5 years. The life span is estimated to be 15–24 years.

== Distribution ==
Galápagos sea lions can be found on all of the main islands of the Galápagos archipelago, and on a number of smaller islands in the area. Less than a quarter of them reside on San Cristobal Island. They have also colonized Isla de la Plata, just offshore mainland Ecuador, and can be spotted from the Ecuadorian coast north to Isla Gorgona in Colombia. Records have also been made of sightings on Isla del Coco, which is about 500 km (310 mi) southwest of Costa Rica. The population on Isla del Coco is considered vagrant.

== Diet and feeding patterns ==
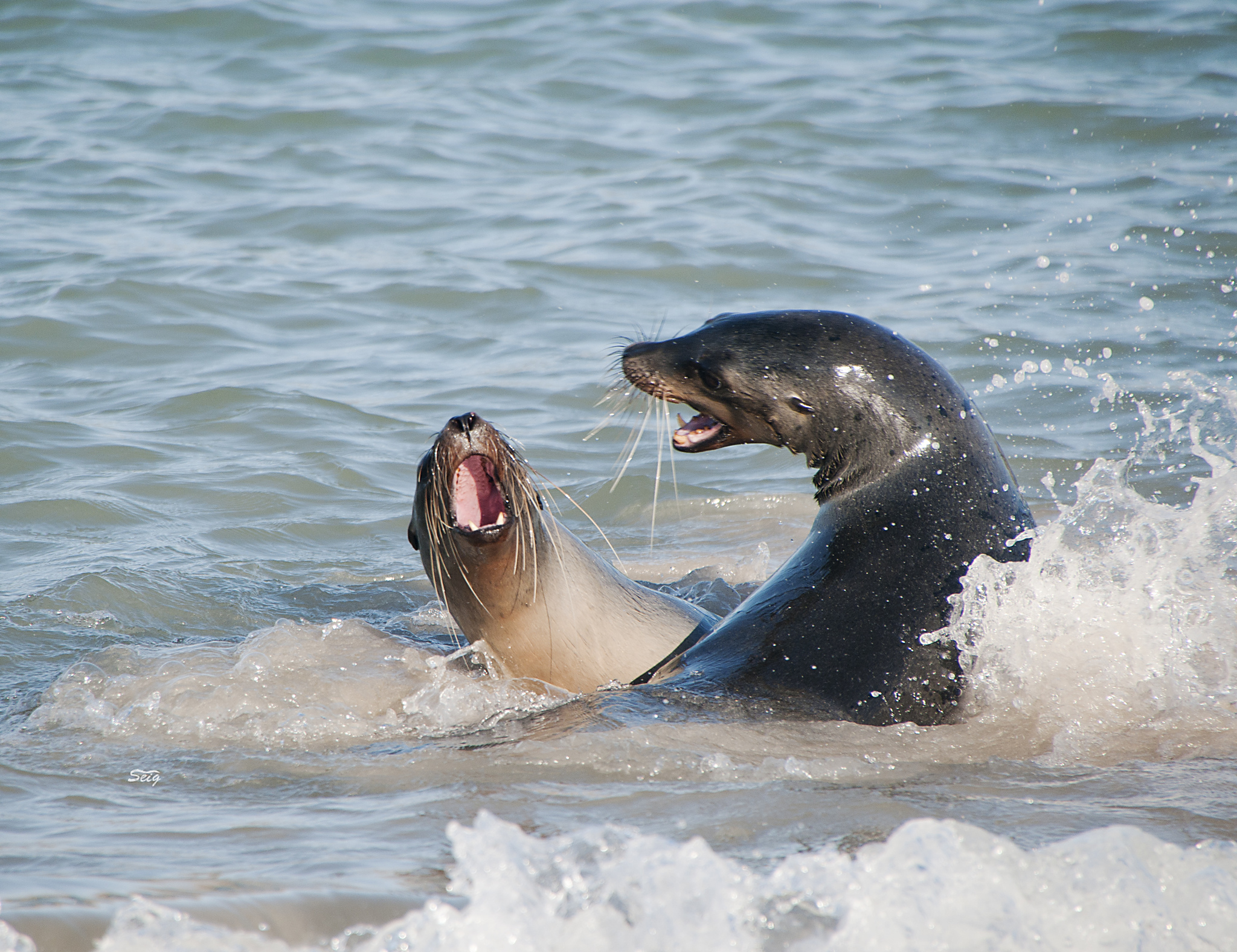
At Santa Fe Island

While information on the diet of Galapagos sea lions is limited, it is known that they are carnivores that feed mostly on sardines. They also eat other marine life like crustaceans, squid, fish (sardines and myctophids/lanternfish), and octopus, which classifies them as piscivores. Galápagos sea lions sometimes travel 10–15 km (6.2–9.3 mi) from the coast over a span of days to hunt. This is when they come into contact with their main predators: sharks and killer whales. Injuries and scars from attacks are often visible. During El Niño events, occurring when the water temperature pattern changes in the Pacific, sardine populations either die or migrate, and sea lions dive deeper to feed on lantern fish. The reduction in food availability during El Niño leads to sea lion population declines. Successful pack hunting of yellowfin tuna, in which the fish were herded into a rocky inlet and occasionally onto land, was recorded in the BBC series Blue Planet II.

A side effect of the close proximity that these sea lions choose to have with humans is the diversified array of food sources that the sea lions can choose from. In addition to the usual hunting strategies, sea lions have learned how to scavenge from fishing boats and have learned methods of hunting that involve the bright lights of the boats themselves.

== Behavior and male competition ==
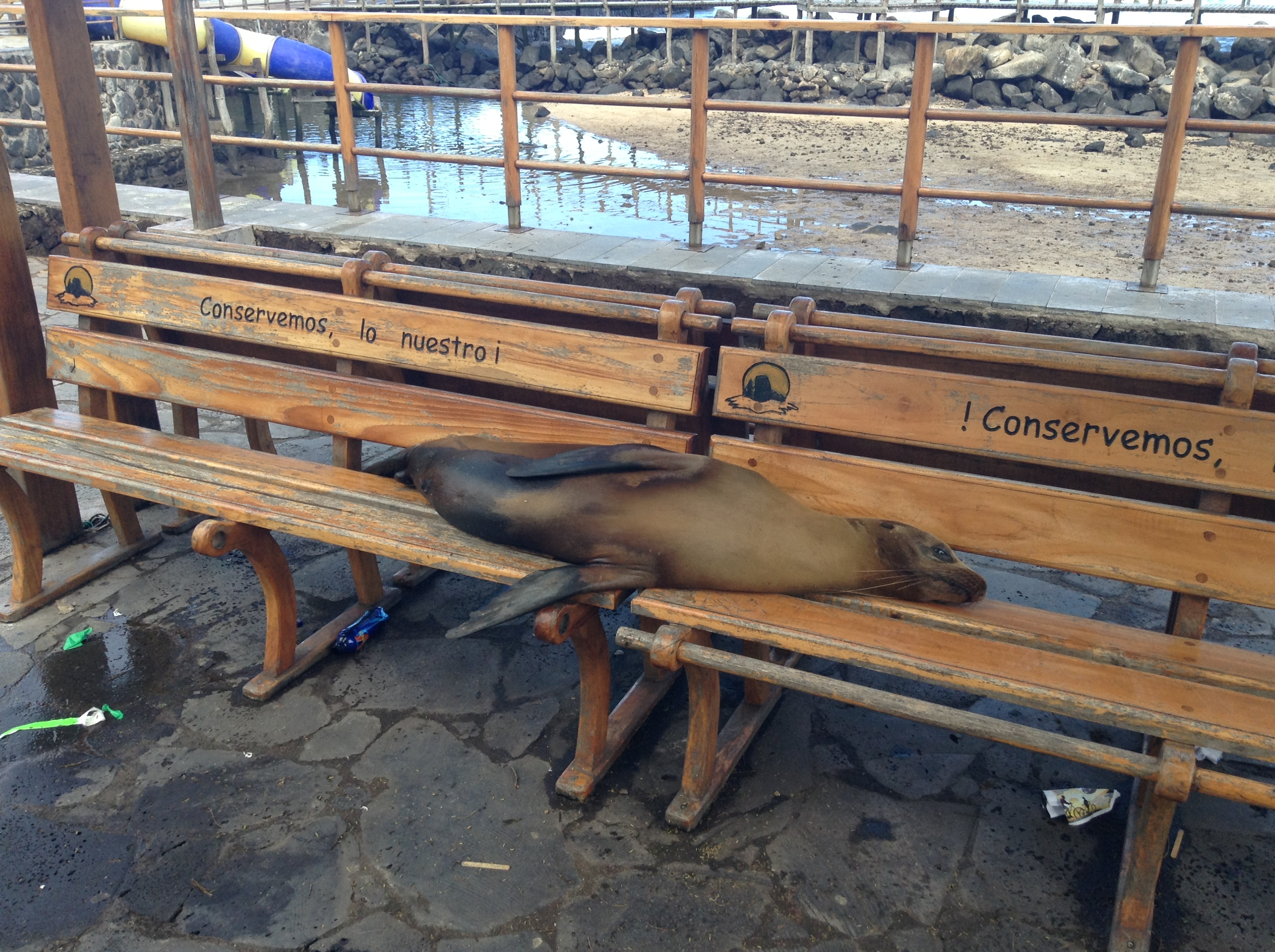
Adult sea lion resting on a park bench in Puerto Baquerizo Moreno.

Galápagos sea lions are especially vulnerable to human activity. Their inquisitive and social nature makes them more likely to approach areas inhabited by humans, and thus come into contact with human waste, fishing nets, and hooks. They occupy many different shoreline types, from steep, rocky cliff sides to low-lying sandy beaches. To avoid overheating during the day, sea lions will take refuge from the sun under vegetation, rocks, and cliffs.

Not only are sea lions social, they are also quite vocal. Adult males often bark in long, loud and distinctive repeated sequences. Females and juveniles do not produce this repetitive bark, but both sexes of younger pups will growl. From birth, a mother sea lion recognizes her pup's distinct bark and can pinpoint it from a crowd of 30 or more barking sea lions.

There are clear cut differences in behavior between territorial and non-territorial males, the first being the territorial males vocalized at higher rates than non-territorial males and the onset of vocalization tends to be higher. Vocalization plays a key role in sexual selection and helps ward off intruding non-territorial males from a male's harem. Most vocalizations made by territorial males are long range and not directed to anything specific.

On land, sea lions form colonies at their hauling-out areas. Adult males, bulls, are the head of the colony, growing up to 7 ft (2 m) long and weighing up to 800 pounds (360 kg). As males grow larger, they fight to win dominance of a harem of between five and 25 cows, along with the surrounding territory. Swimming from border to border of his colony, the dominant bull jealously defends his coastline against all other adult males. While patrolling his area, he frequently rears his head out of the water and barks, as an indication of his territorial ownership. The neighboring territorial males tend to display a "dear enemy effect", whereby territorial males decrease vocalization and aggression. Through repetitive encounters with other territorial bulls, males also store key information about a neighbor's strength as an adversary.

The average dominant bull holds his territory for only a few months. Because the dominant male of the harem cannot feed while defending his colony, he eventually becomes weakened and is overpowered by a well-nourished, fresh bull. On land, these fights start with two bulls stretching out their necks and barking to test each other's bravery. If this is not enough to scare the opponent off, they begin pushing each other and biting the opponent's neck. Males are equipped with thick, muscular necks that generally prevent lethal damage during these fights. Blood is often drawn, however, and many male sea lions bear battle scars from these territorial competitions. Losers are chased from their territory by the new dominant bull with much splashing.

Because there is only one male in each harem, there is always a surplus of bachelor male sea lions. They usually congregate fairly peaceably on less favorable areas of the coastline in bachelor colonies. One of the most commonly known is atop the cliffs of the South Plaza Island of the Galápagos chain. Territorial males that lose their territory but decide to stay on the island tend to vocalize less.

== Breeding ==
The age of maturity for Galápagos sea lions is about 4–5 years. The life span is estimated to be 15–24 years. Breeding takes place from May through January. Because of this prolonged breeding season and the extensive care required by the pups from their mother, there are dependent pups in the colonies year round. Each cow in the harem has a single pup born a year after conception. After about a week of continuous attention from birth, the female returns to the ocean and begins to forage, and just a week after that, the pup will follow her and begin to develop its swimming skills. When the pup is two to three weeks old, the cow will mate again. The mothers will take the young pups with them into the water while nursing until around the 11th month, when the pups are weaned from their mother's milk and begin developing their own hunting skills.

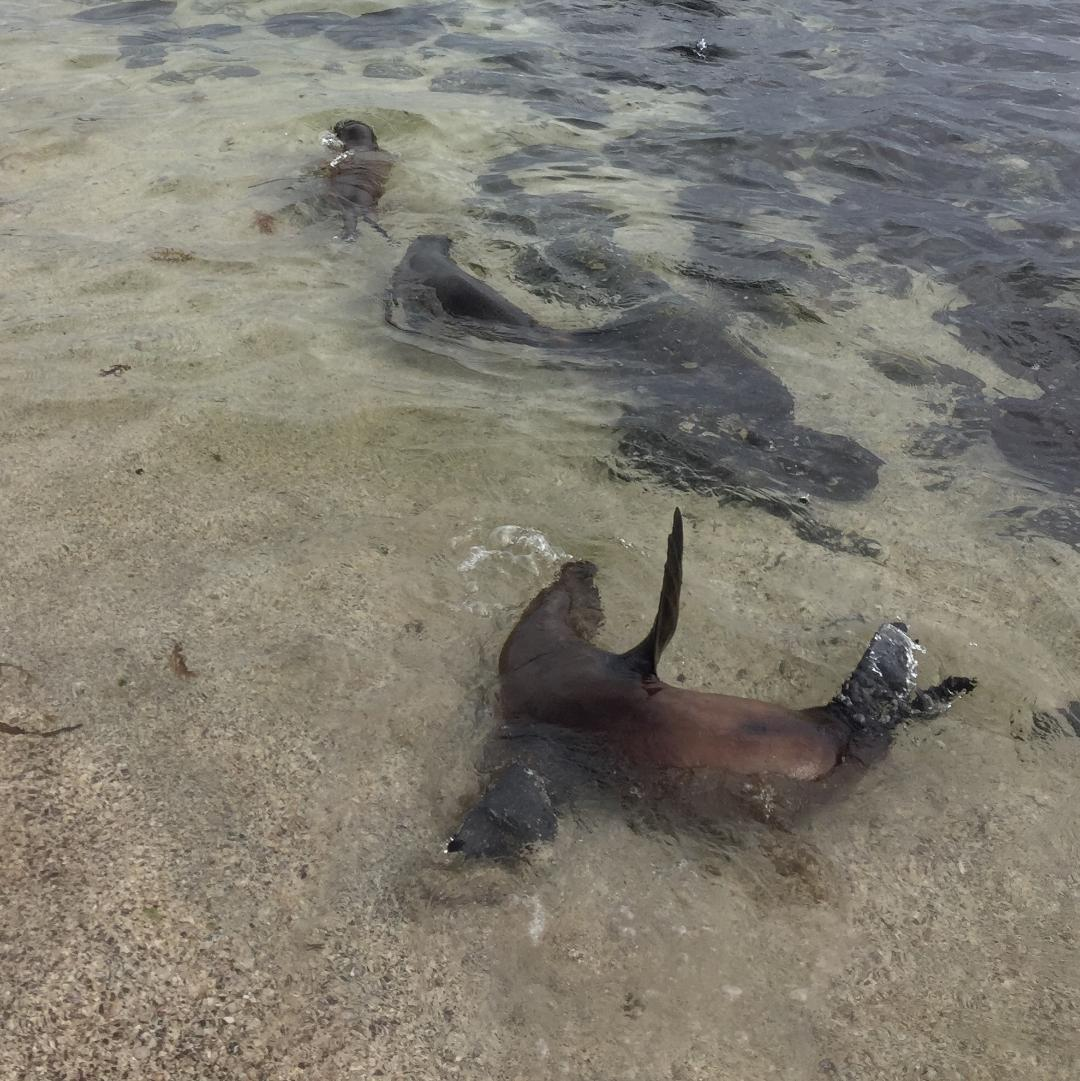
Galápagos sea lion displaying "jug handle" behavior to reduce heat loss

The lasting interaction of mother–offspring pairs is a central social unit in these sea lions. The cow will nurture a pup for up to three years. In that time, the cow and the pup will recognize each other's bark from the rest of the colony. Within the colony, sea lion pups live together in a rookery. Pups can be seen together napping, playing, and feeding. It is not uncommon to see one cow 'baby-sitting' a group of pups while the other cows go off to feed.

Many mammals synchronize their pregnancies to ensure a greater infant survival rate, but not Z. wollebaeki. Plausible reasons for this low synchrony could be the absence of strong photoperiodic change throughout the year, which is thought to regulate embryonic diapause, and/or adaptation to an environment with variable productivity and prey availability.

== Threats and status ==
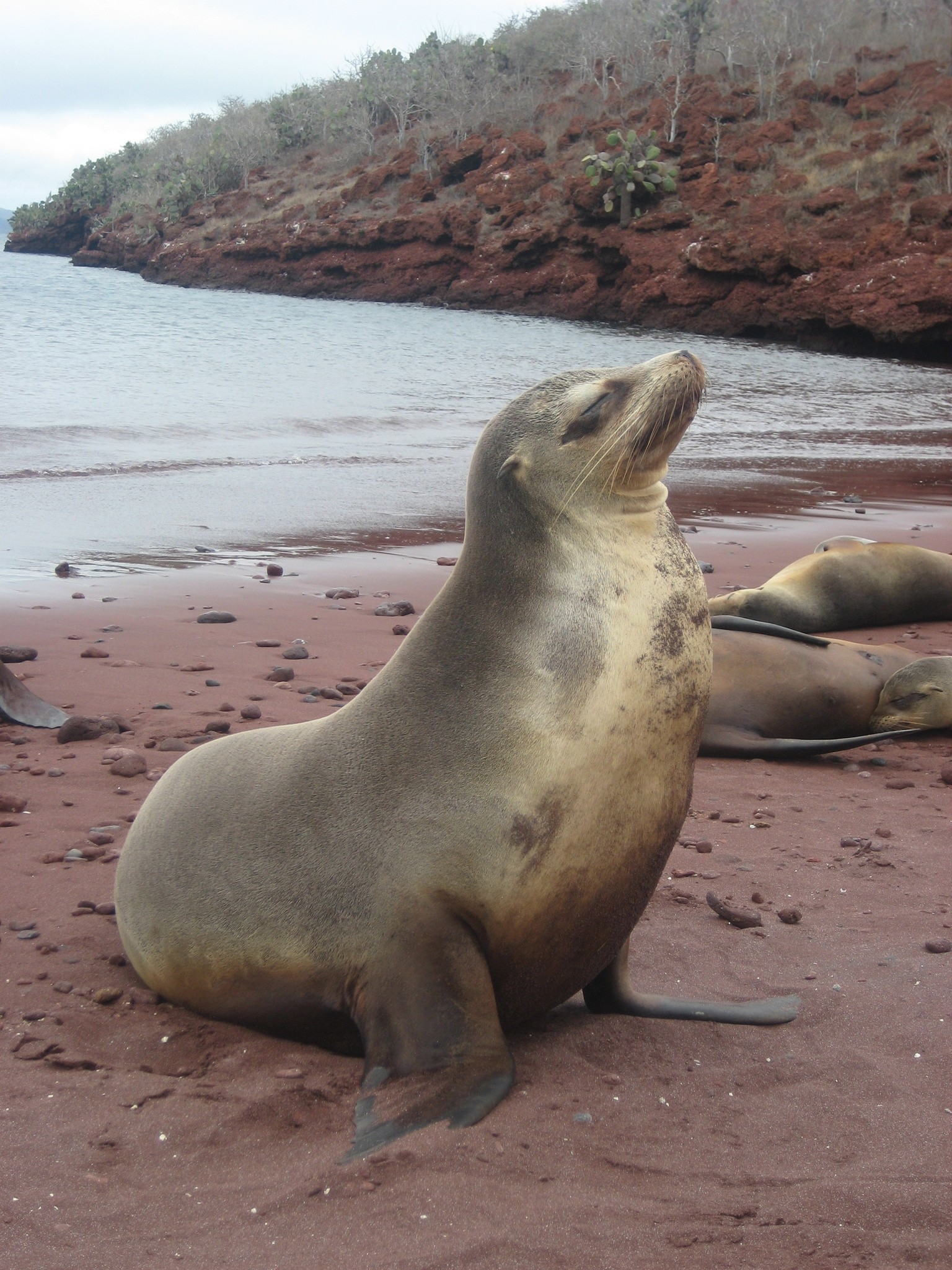
At Isla Santiago

The majority of the Galápagos population is protected, as the islands are a part of an Ecuadorian national park surrounded by a marine resources reserve. Although the Galápagos Islands are a popular tourist destination, strict rules exist to protect all wildlife from disturbance. Fluctuating between 20,000 and 50,000 sea lions, the population does have a few threats. During el Niño events, the population tends to decrease as ocean temperatures warm and cold-adapted marine life on which the sea lions depend declines, which lead to die-offs or cessation of reproduction. Sharks and killer whales are the main predators of the sea lion. Although adult sea lions have less to worry about, pups are easy targets. Regulations governing human behavior help mitigate risks to sea lions due to human contact, but as the human population continues to grow it nevertheless presents risks of accident and disease. The sea lions have learned that being near the fisheries they have a better chance at capturing fish with little to no work, but as a result they are in more danger from boats and net entanglement. They are impacted by humans indirectly as well. Stray dogs introduced by humans form packs and attack sea lions. The pesticide DDT, still in targeted use to prevent malaria in tropical countries, accumulates through the food chain and is found at near-toxic concentrations in sea lion pups. From 2008 through 2012, death by disease increased. Galapagos Sea lions are known to be susceptible to canine distemper virus, however this disease is not believed to be endemic among the population. Toxoplasma gondii, a protozoan parasite responsible for toxoplasmosis, has been detected recently in sea lions.
