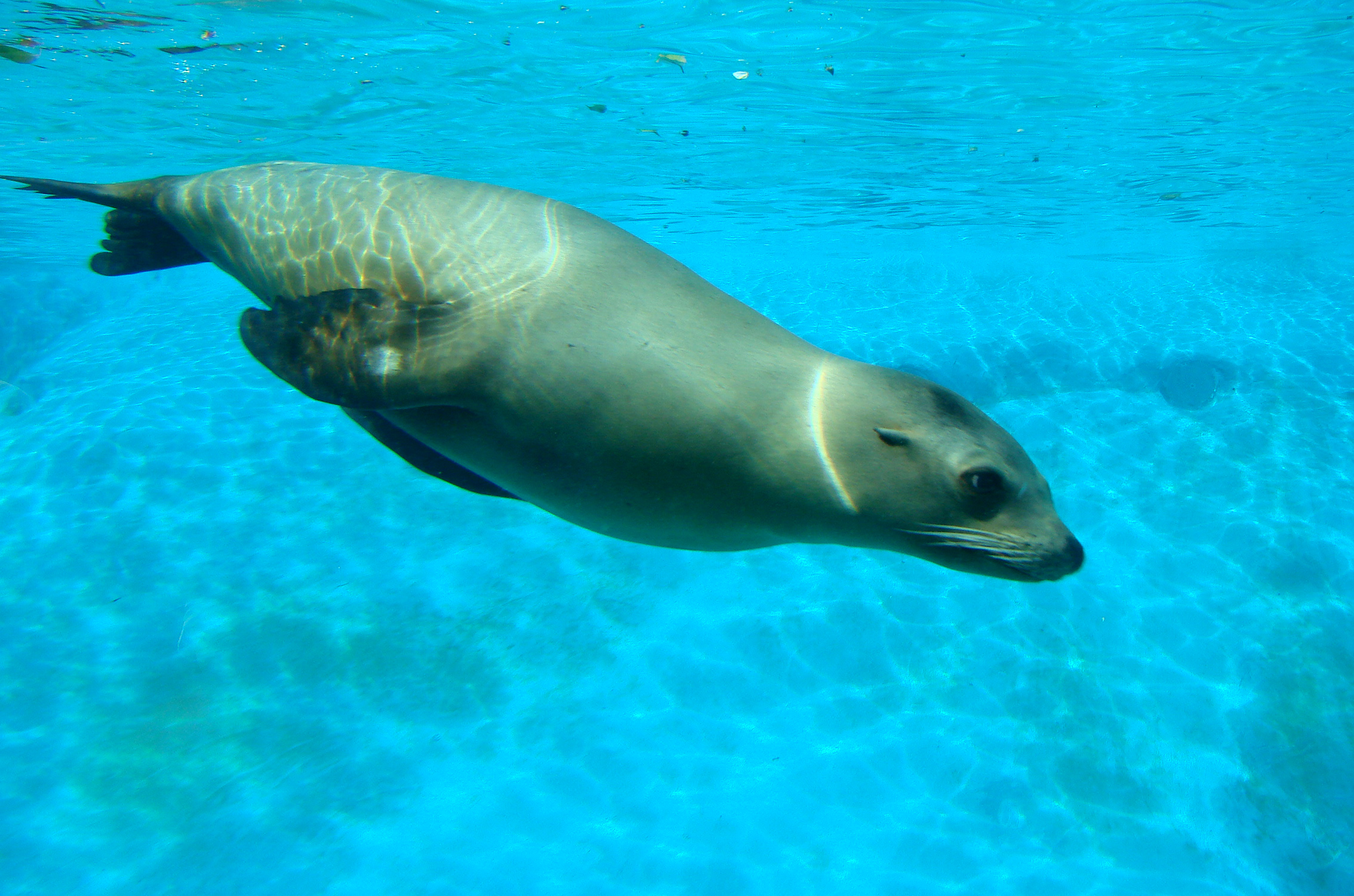
- Californian sea lion

Scientific classification
- Kingdom: Animalia
- Phylum: Chordata
- Class: Mammalia
- Infraclass: Placentalia
- Order: Carnivora
- Parvorder: Pinnipedia
- Family: Otariidae
- Genus: Zalophus; Gill, 1866

Type species
- Otaria gillespii MacBain, 1858 [=Zalophus californianus Lesson, 1828]
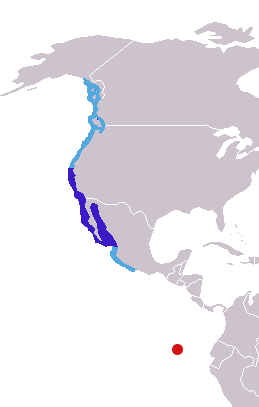
- Z. californianus breeding range Z. californianus total range Z. wollebaeki range

= Zalophus =

Genus of carnivores

Zalophus is a genus of the family Otariidae (sea lions and fur seals) of the order Carnivora.

== Description ==
The seals of the genus Zalophus present a striking sexual dimorphism, since the adult males have a pronounced sagittal crest, and weigh, in the Californian species, between 300 and 380 kg with 240 cm long, and the females 80 to 120 kg with between 180 and 200 cm. As with all ear seals, the males are significantly larger and heavier than the females. The males are dark brown in color, the females are lighter. In contrast to the other ear seals, the males do not have a clearly defined mane. In the Galapagos species the males weigh about 250 kg with a length of 250 to 270 cm, while the females weigh from 60 to 100 kg with a length of between 150 and 170 cm.

They have a streamlined body, with a layer of fat under the skin, to provide warmth and buoyancy. The coat is brown. They have large eyes that help compensate for low light levels in the underwater environment, while their whiskers increase their sense of touch. The nostrils close automatically once they touch the water. Their long front fins rotate outward for better movement on land, and propel them forward in the water, where they stay as long as possible.

== Systematics ==
For a long time, specialists debated whether the 3 taxa that make up this genus were three full, monotypic species, or instead a single species with three subspecies; in the latter case, by priority, this species would be Zalophus californianus.

As early as 1953, the zoologist Erling Sivertsen created a new indicative classification, after he investigated and catalogued again, in the Oslo Museum, skulls and archaeological remains, collected by the Norwegian expedition ship MK Norvegia between 1928 and 1929. Traditionally, the three populations were listed as subspecies of a common species, but this was controversial. Wilson & Reeder classified the three populations as separate species. A molecular genetic study by Wolf et al. (2007) came to the same conclusion based on mitochondrial DNA and cell nucleus DNA SNPs. Furthermore, according to a molecular clock reconstruction, the Californian and Galápagos sea lions separated around 2.3 (± 0.5) million years ago.

=== Species ===
It includes these species, of which one became recently extinct:

Image	Name	Distribution
	Z. californianus: California sea lion	western coast and islands of North America, from southeast Alaska to central Mexico.
	Z. wollebaeki: Galápagos sea lion	Galapagos islands and Ecuadorian coast, north to Isla Gorgona in Colombia.
	Z. japonicus: Japanese sea lion †	Japan and Korea; vagrant to southern Kamchatka Peninsula and Sakhalin Island in Russia

== Ecology ==
These seals go to rest on the coasts. When looking for food, they dive up to 40 meters deep and prey on fish and octopus. During the breeding season, the males establish strictly guarded territories on the coasts and try to gain a harem from several females.

They feed on fish and mollusks. They are very sociable and are found in large groups, on cliffs, coasts, and even on human constructions, such as piers and navigation bowls.

=== Reproduction ===
Unlike fur seals (Arctocephalus) which live in well-structured social groups, the species of the genus Zalophus form variable groups lacking in organization, although the males are also territorial and usually form harems of about fifteen females each. Males make loud sounds to mark territory. They usually mate between May and January depending on the species. Females give birth to only one young, which is born on land or water after a gestation that lasts between 342 and 365 days. They are the only mammals whose milk does not contain lactose. Females wean their young after 11 to 12 months, but some nurse their one-year-old pups alongside their newborns.

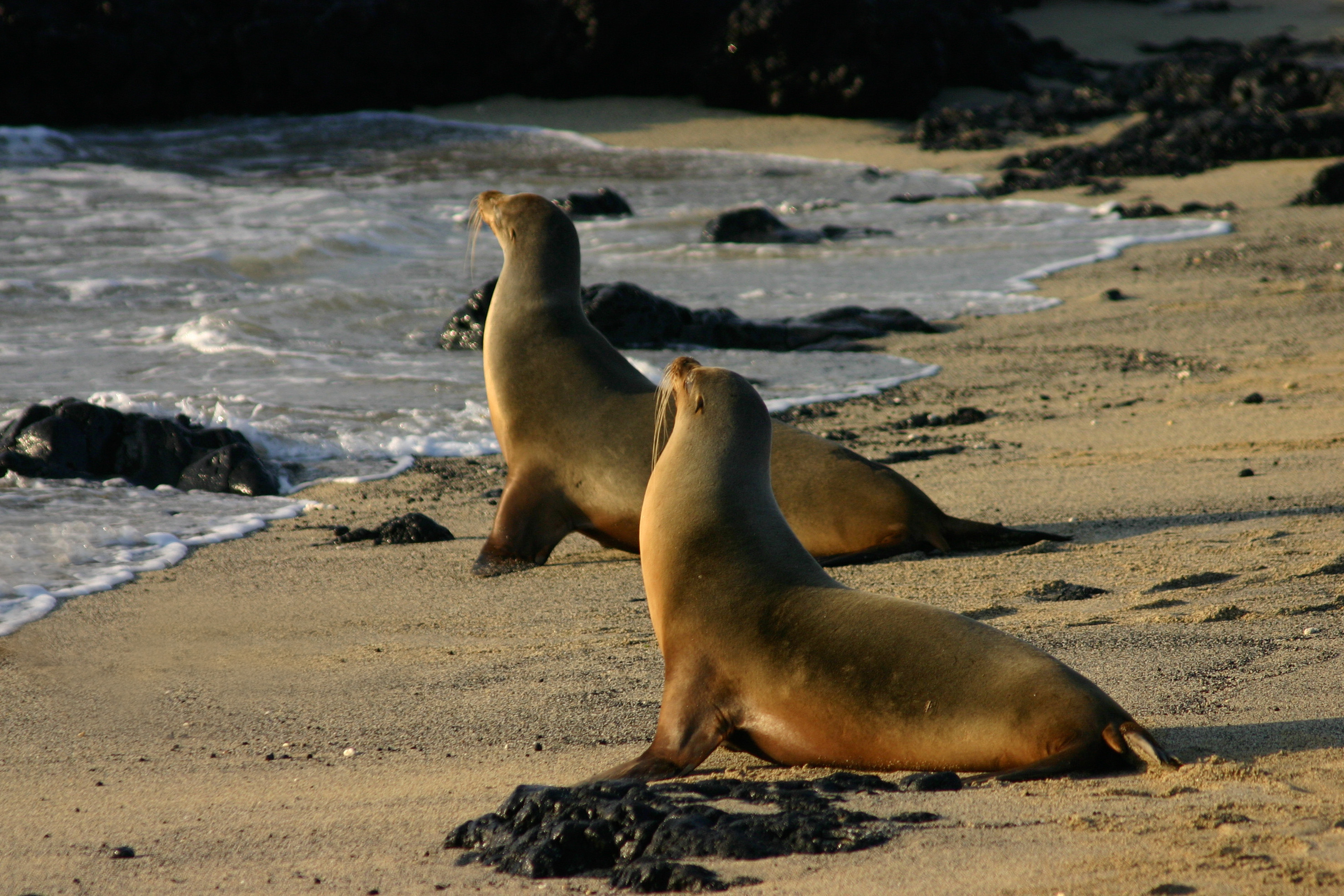
A pair of Galápagos sea lions (Zalophus wollebaeki) on Isabela Island, Galapagos Islands. Photographed in the early morning.

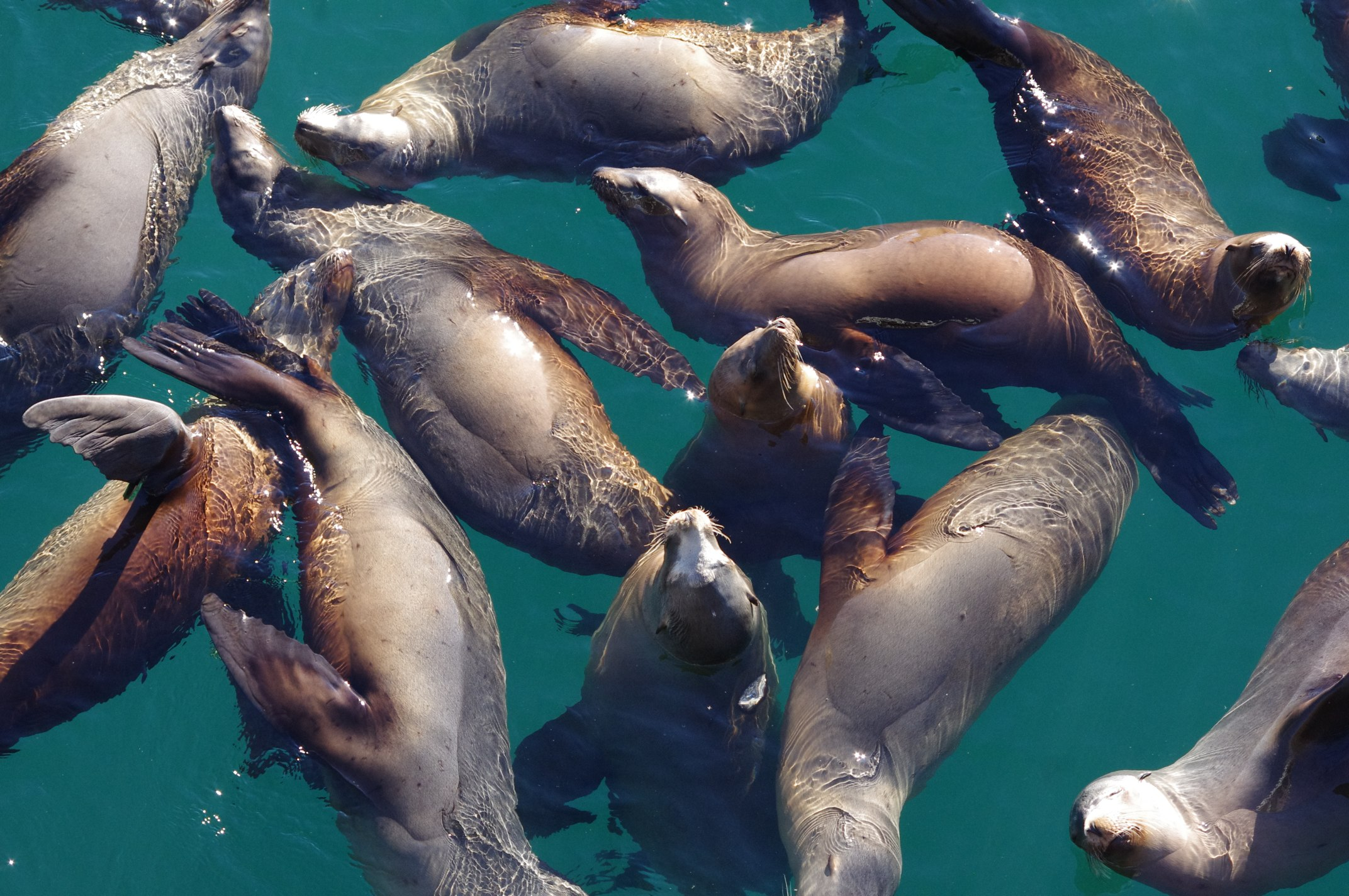
California Sea lions at Santa Cruz, California

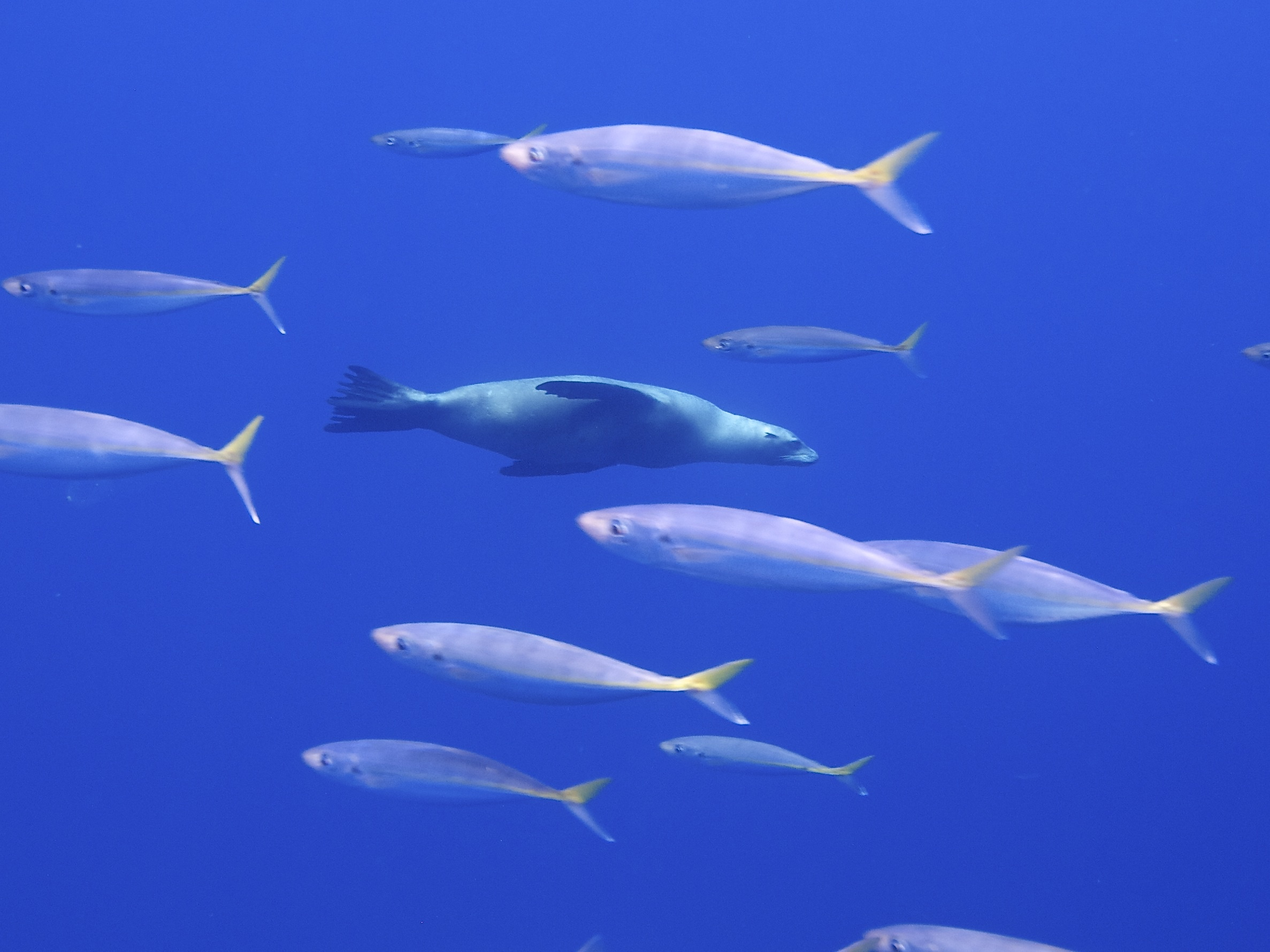
California Sea lions (Zalophus californianus) swimming past fish, Guadalupe Island, Mexico
