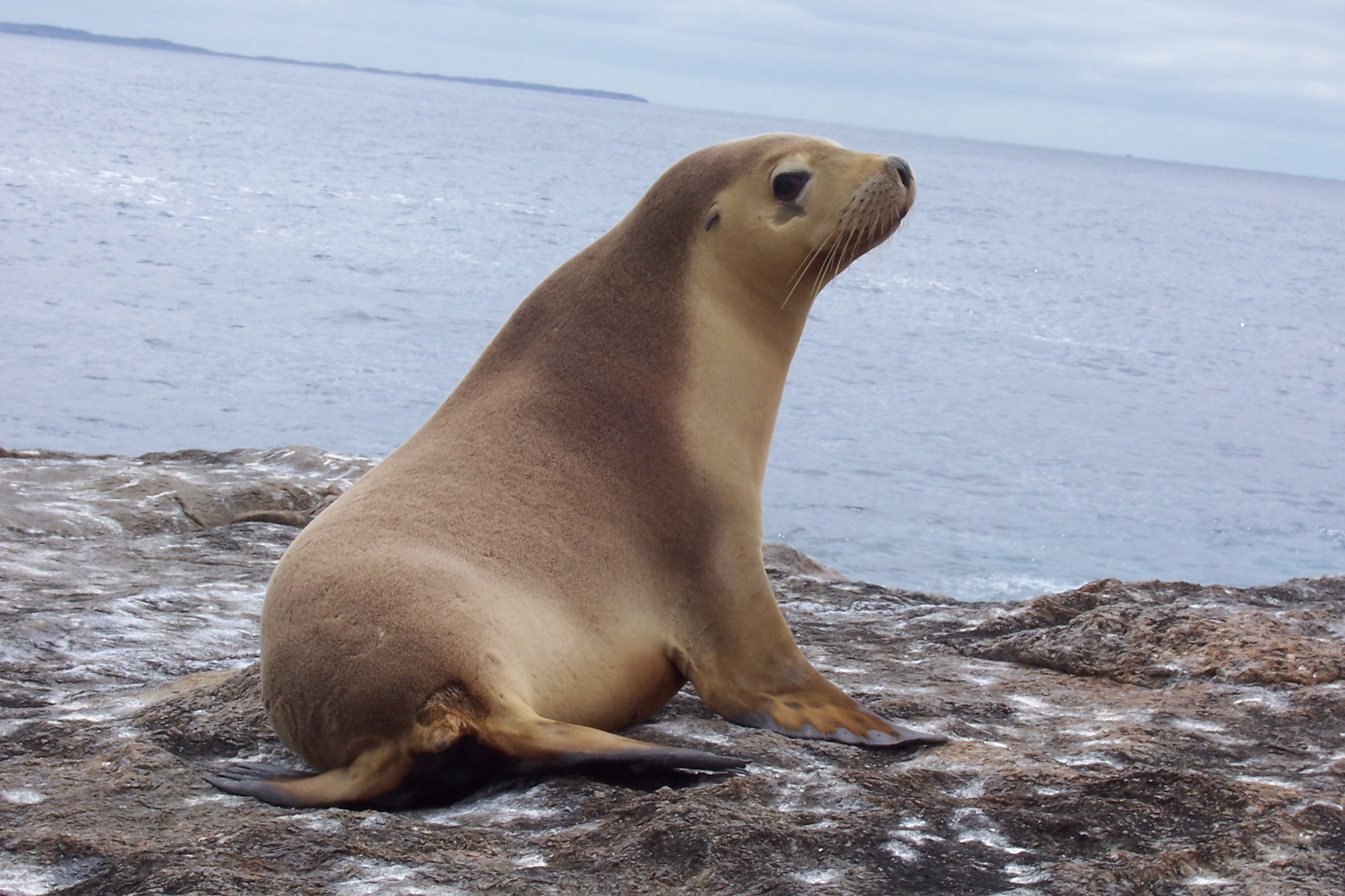
- An Australian sea lion (Neophoca cinerea)

Scientific classification
- Kingdom: Animalia
- Phylum: Chordata
- Class: Mammalia
- Infraclass: Placentalia
- Order: Carnivora
- Parvorder: Pinnipedia
- Clade: Panotariidae
- Family: Otariidae; Gray, 1825

Type genus
- Otaria Péron, 1816

Genera
- List: Arctocephalus Callorhinus †Eotaria Eumetopias Neophoca Otaria Phocarctos †Pithanotaria †Proterozetes †Thalassoleon Zalophus
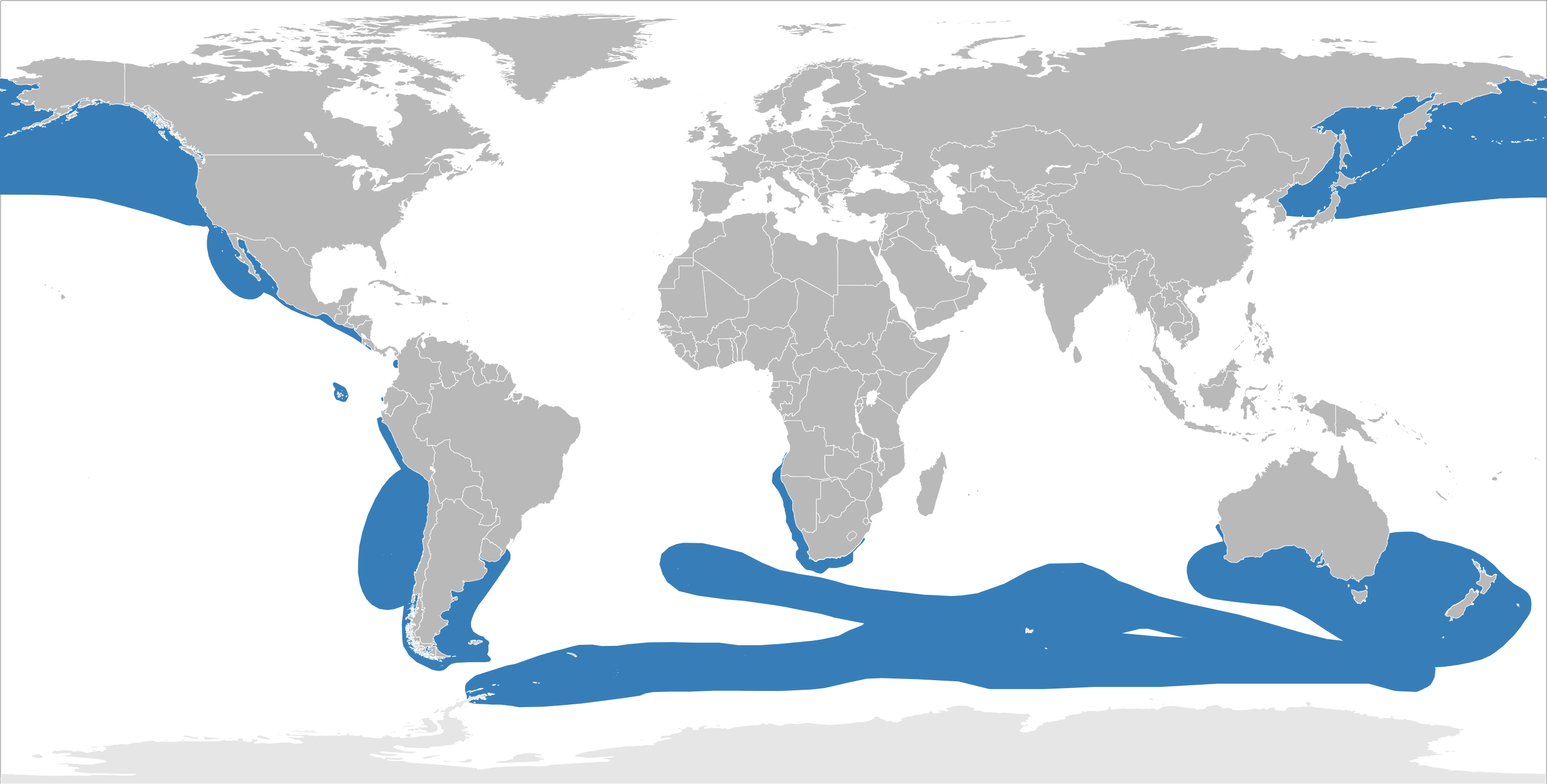
- Otariidae distribution

= Eared seal =

Eared seals Temporal range: Miocene–Holocene, 17.1–0 Ma

Family of marine mammals

An eared seal, otariid, or otary, is any member of the marine mammal family Otariidae, one of three groupings of pinnipeds. They comprise 15 extant species in seven genera (another species became extinct in the 1950s) and are commonly known either as sea lions or fur seals, distinct from true seals (phocids) and the walrus (odobenids). Otariids are adapted to a semiaquatic lifestyle, feeding and migrating in the water, but breeding and resting on land or ice. They reside in subpolar, temperate, and equatorial waters throughout the Pacific and Southern Oceans, the southern Indian, and Atlantic Oceans. They are conspicuously absent in the north Atlantic.

The words "otariid" and "otary" come from the Ancient Greek ὠτάριον (ōtárion), meaning "little ear", referring to the small but visible external ear flaps (pinnae), which distinguishes them from the phocids.

== Evolution and taxonomy ==
Morphological and molecular evidence supports a monophyletic origin of pinnipeds, sharing a common ancestor with Musteloidea, though an earlier hypothesis suggested that Otаriidae are descended from a common ancestor most closely related to modern bears. Debate remains as to whether the phocids diverged from the otariids before or after the walrus.

Otariids arose in the Miocene (15–17 million years ago) in the North Pacific, diversifying rapidly into the Southern Hemisphere, where most species now live. The earliest known fossil otariid is Eotaria crypta from southern California, while the genus Callorhinus (northern fur seal) has the oldest fossil record of any living otariid, extending to the middle Pliocene. It probably arose from the extinct fur seal genus Thalassoleon.

Traditionally, otariids had been subdivided into the fur seal (Arctocephalinae) and sea lion (Otariinae) subfamilies, with the major distinction between them being the presence of a thick underfur layer in the former. Under this categorization, the fur seals comprised two genera: Callorhinus in the North Pacific with a single representative, the northern fur seal (C. ursinus), and eight species in the Southern Hemisphere under the genus Arctocephalus; while the sea lions comprise five species under five genera. Molecular studies do not support the traditional division of otariids into fur seal and sea lion subfamilies. In particular, Callorhinus is generally recovered as an early-diverging lineage relative to the remaining otariids, rather than as a close relative of the southern fur seals (Arctocephalus). Furthermore, many of the Otariinae appear to be more phylogenetically distinct than previously assumed; for example, the Japanese sea lion (Zalophus japonicus) is now considered a separate species, rather than a subspecies of the California sea lion (Zalophus californius).

In light of this evidence, the subfamily separation has been removed entirely and the family Otariidae has been organized into seven genera with 16 species and two subspecies. Nonetheless, because of morphological and behavioral similarities among the "fur seals" and "sea lions", these remain useful categories when discussing differences between groups of species. Compared to sea lions, fur seals are generally smaller, exhibit greater sexual dimorphism, eat smaller prey and go on longer foraging trips; and, of course, there is the contrast between the coarse short sea lion hair and the fur seal's fur.

Cladogram showing relationships among the otarids, combining several phylogenetic analyses. The fur seal branch has not been resolved.

- Pinnipedia
  - Phocidae
    "Earless" seals
  - Otarioidea
    - Odobenidae
      Walrus
    - Otariidae (eared seals)
      - Northern fur seal
      - - - South American sea lion
          - - Australian sea lion
            - New Zealand sea lion
          - Arctocephalus (fur seals)
            ⊞8 species
            ⊟
            - - Cape fur seal
              - Subantarctic fur seal
            - - Antarctic fur seal
              - - Guadalupe fur seal
                - Juan Fernández fur seal
              - - Antipodean fur seal
                - - Galápagos fur seal
                  - South American fur seal
        - Otariinae
          - Steller sea lion
          - Zalophus
            - California sea lion
            - Galápagos sea lion
            - †Japanese sea lion

== Anatomy ==
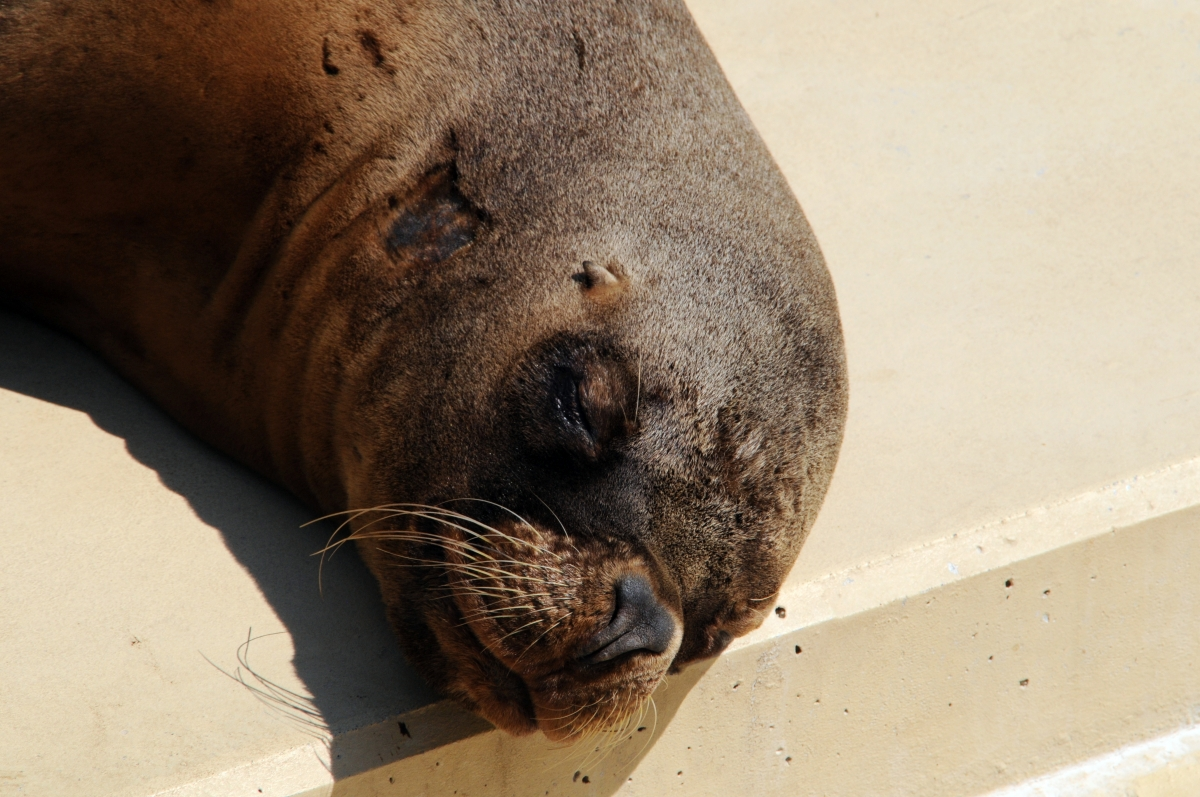
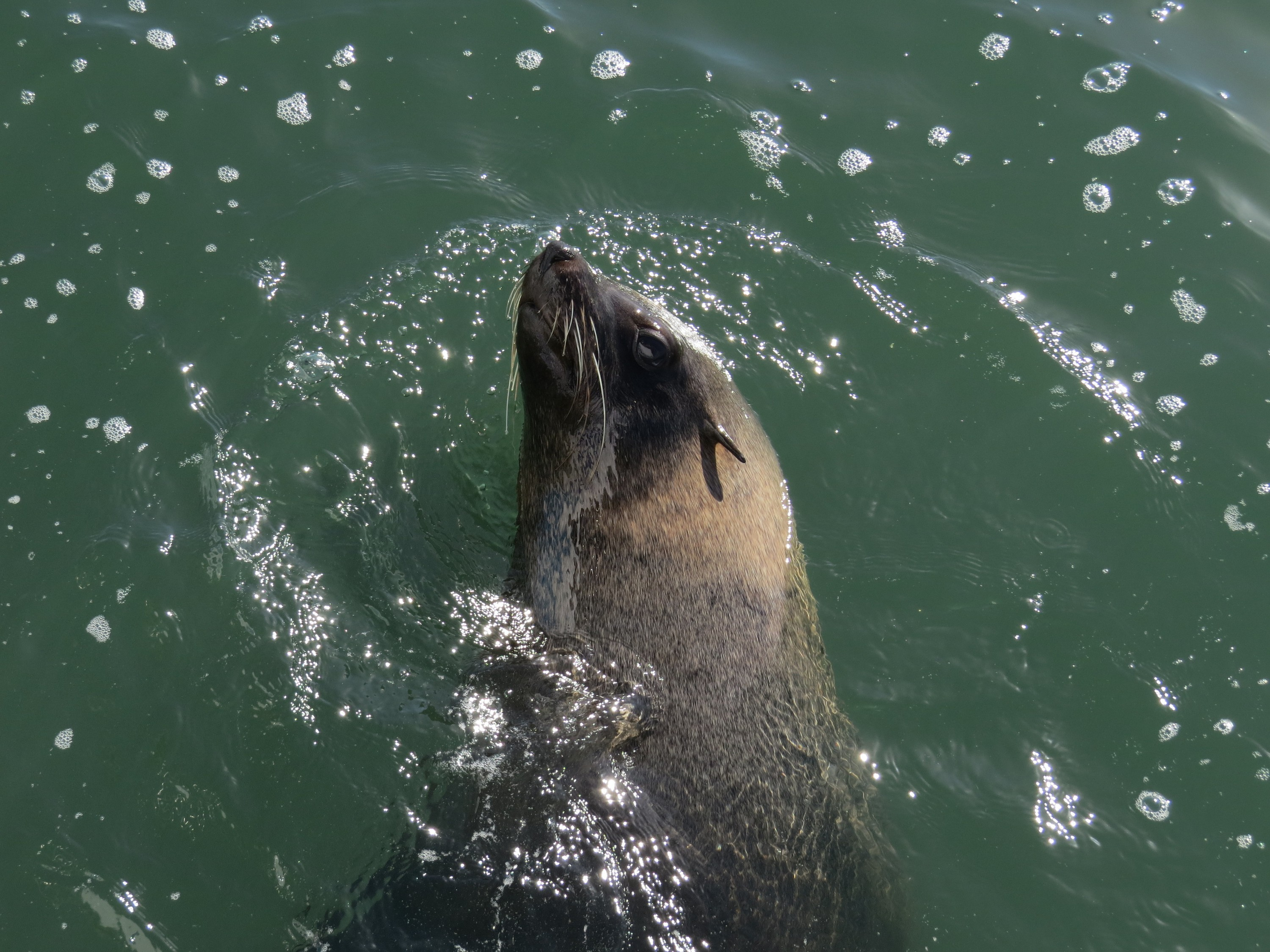
The ear flaps (pinnae) of Otariids are small yet evident

Otariids have proportionately much larger fore-flippers and pectoral muscles than true seals (phocids), and have the ability to turn their hind limbs forward and walk on all fours, making them far more maneuverable on land. They are generally considered to be less adapted to an aquatic lifestyle than phocids, since they breed primarily on land and haul out more frequently than true seals. However, they can attain higher bursts of speed and have greater maneuverability in the water. Their swimming power derives from the use of flippers more so than the sinuous whole-body movements typical of phocids and walruses.

Otariids are further distinguished by a more dog-like head, sharp, well-developed canines, and the aforementioned visible external pinnae. Their postcanine teeth are generally simple and conical in shape. The dental formula for eared seals is: 3.1.4.1-32.1.4.1.

Sea lions are covered with coarse guard hairs, while fur seals have a thick underfur, which has historically made them the objects of commercial exploitation.

Male otariids range in size from the 70 kg (150 lb) Galápagos fur seal, smallest of all otariids, to the over 1,000-kg (2,200-lb) Steller sea lion. Mature male otariids weigh two to six times as much as females, with proportionately larger heads, necks, and chests, making them the most sexually dimorphic of all mammals.

== Behavior ==
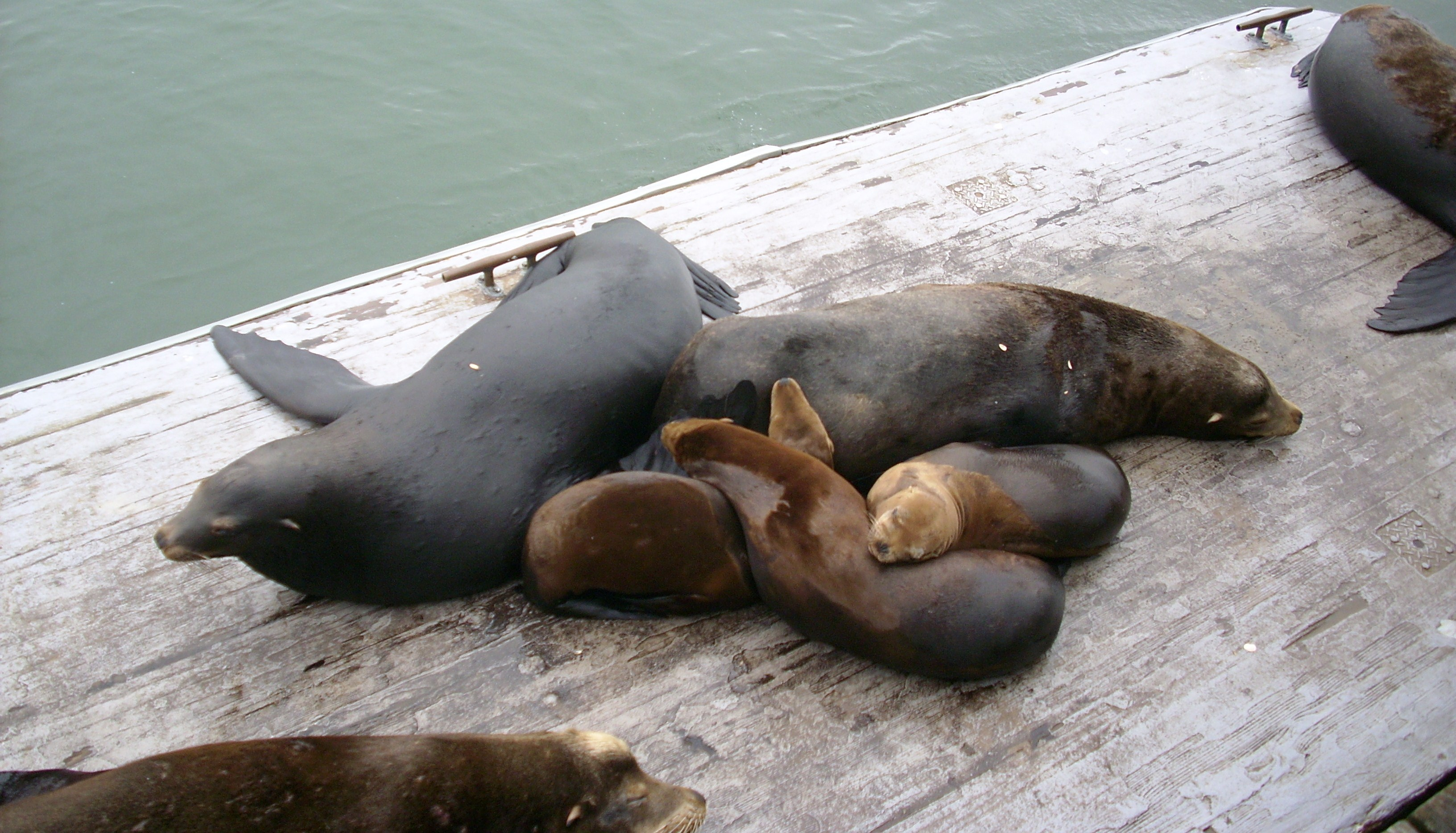
California sea lions

California sea lions lounging in the sun in a zoo in Japan

All otariids breed on land during well-defined breeding seasons. Except for the Australian sea lion, which has an atypical 17.5 month breeding cycle, they form strictly annual aggregations on beaches or rocky substrates, often on islands. All species are polygynous; i.e. successful males breed with several females. In most species, males arrive at breeding sites first and establish and maintain territories through vocal and visual displays and occasional fighting. Females typically arrive on shore a day or so before giving birth. While considered social animals, no permanent hierarchies or statuses are established on the colonies. The extent to which males control females or territories varies between species. Thus, the northern fur seal and the South American sea lion tend to herd specific harem-associated females, occasionally injuring them, while the Steller sea lion and the New Zealand sea lion control spatial territories, but do not generally interfere with the movement of the females. Female New Zealand sea lions are the only otariids that move up to 2 km (1.2 mi) into forests to protect their pups during the breeding season.

Otariids are carnivorous, feeding on fish, squid and krill. Sea lions tend to feed closer to shore in upwelling zones, feeding on larger fish, while the smaller fur seals tend to take longer, offshore foraging trips and can subsist on large numbers of smaller prey items. They are visual feeders. Some females are capable of dives of up to 400 m (1,300 ft).

== Species ==
=== Family Otariidae ===
- Subfamily Arctocephalinae (fur seals)
  - Genus Arctocephalus
    - Brown fur seal, A. pusillus
      - South African fur seal, A. pusillus pusillus
      - Australian fur seal, A. pusillus doriferus
    - Antarctic fur seal, A. gazella
    - Guadalupe fur seal, A. townsendi
    - Juan Fernández fur seal, A. philippii
    - Galápagos fur seal, A. galapagoensis
    - New Zealand fur seal (or southern fur seal), A. forsteri
    - Subantarctic fur seal, A. tropicalis
    - South American fur seal, A. australis
  - Genus Callorhinus
    - Northern fur seal, C. ursinus
- Subfamily Otariinae (sea lions)
  - Genus Eumetopias
    - Steller sea lion, E. jubatus
  - Genus Neophoca
    - Australian sea lion, N. cinerea
  - Genus Otaria
    - South American sea lion, O. flavescens
  - Genus Phocarctos
    - New Zealand sea lion (or Hooker's sea lion), P. hookeri
  - Genus Zalophus
    - California sea lion, Z. californianus
    - †Japanese sea lion, Z. japonicus – extinct (1970s)
    - Galápagos sea lion, Z. wollebaeki

Although the two subfamilies of otariids, the Otariinae (sea lions) and Arctocephalinae (fur seals), are still widely used, recent molecular studies have demonstrated that they may be invalid as traditionally defined. Instead, they suggest three clades within the family; one consisting of the northern sea lions (Eumetopias and Zalophus), one of the northern fur seal (Callorhinus) and its extinct relatives, and the third of all the remaining Southern Hemisphere species.
