= Pithanotaria =

Pithanotaria Temporal range: Miocene

Scientific classification
- Kingdom: Animalia
- Phylum: Chordata
- Class: Mammalia
- Order: Carnivora
- Parvorder: Pinnipedia
- Family: Otariidae
- Genus: †Pithanotaria; Kellogg, 1925
- Species: †P. starri

Binomial name
- †Pithanotaria starri Kellogg, 1925

Extinct genus of mammals

Pithanotaria is an extinct genus of otariid that lived in the North Pacific during the Miocene epoch. It is a monotypic genus that is known from the species Pithanotaria starri.

== Palaeoecology ==
Pithanotaria was a carnivore that predominantly foraged in nearshore habitats.
