= List of fossil pinnipedimorphs =

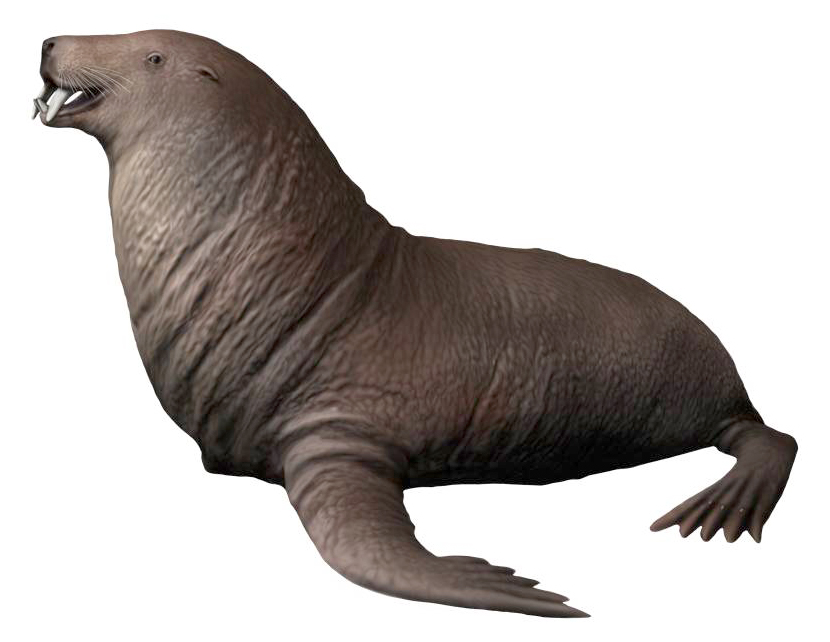
Life restoration of Gomphotaria pugnax

Pinnipeds are marine mammals that evolved from arctoid carnivorans that includes seals, eared seals, and walruses. There are 34 recent species of pinnipeds and 102 species of fossil pinnipeds and their stem-relatives (Pinnipedimorpha), collectively referred to as pinnipedimorphs. Scientists still debate on which lineage of arctoid carnivorans are the closest relatives to the pinnipedimorphs, being either more closely related to bears or to musteloids. Two stem-pinniped families found outside of Pinnipedimorpha, Amphicynodontidae and Semantoridae, were in the past considered to be subfamilies of Ursidae and Mustelidae respectively. In comparison to the two other major groups of marine or sea mammals, cetaceans and sirenians, pinnipeds are a relatively younger group having appeared about 24 to 38 million years ago and are still able to return on land to breed.

The list of fossil taxa is based on mostly the historiographical data from Valenzuela-Toro and Pyenson (2019). The two stem-pinniped arctoid families Amphicynodontidae and Semantoridae are included here as well, although neither family are members of Pinnipedimorpha. The list does not include the recently extinct Caribbean monk seal (Neomonachus tropicalis) and the Japanese sea lion (Zalophus japonicus), as they became extinct within the last two centuries.

== Phylogeny ==
Below is an overall phylogeny of the taxa covered in the article followed after a composite tree in Berta et al. (2018) and a total-evidence (combined molecular-morphological) dataset in Paterson et al. (2020):

- - Pan-Pinnipedia
    - †Amphicynodontidae
    - - †Semantoridae
      - - Pinnipedimorpha
          - †Enaliarctidae
          - - Pinnipediformes
              - †Pinnarctidion
              - - - †Pacificotaria
                  - †Pteronarctos
                - Pinnipedia
                  - Phocoidea
                    - Phocidae
                  - Otarioidea
                    - †Desmatophocidae
                    - - - Odobenidae
                        - - Panotariidae
                            - †Eotaria
                            - Otariidae

== Stem-pinniped panpinnipeds ==
=== †Amphicynodontidae Simpson, 1945 ===
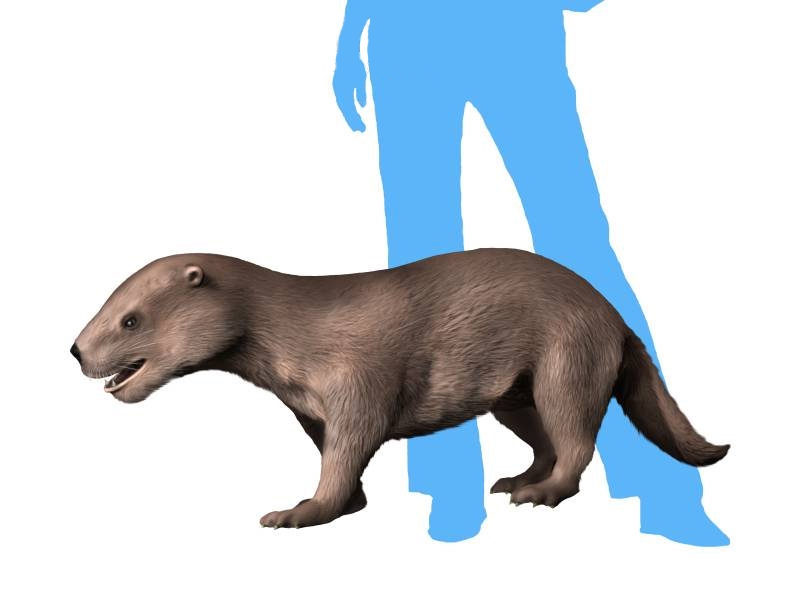
Artist's restoration of Kolponomos newportensis

- †Amphicticeps Matthew & Granger, 1924
  - †Amphicticeps makhchinus Wang et al., 2005
  - †Amphicticeps dorog Wang et al., 2005
  - †Amphicticeps shackelfordi Matthew & Granger, 1924
- †Drassonax Galbreath, 1953
  - †Drassonax harpagops Galbreath, 1953
- †Parictis Scott, 1893 [Campylocynodon Chaffee, 1954]
  - †Parictis primaevus Scott, 1893
  - †Parictis personi (Chaffee, 1954) [Campylocynodon personi Chaffee, 1954]
  - †Parictis montanus Clark & Guensburg, 1972
  - †Parictis parvus Clark & Beerbower, 1967
  - †Parictis gilpini Clark & Guensburg, 1972
  - †Parictis dakotensis Clark, 1936
- †Kolponomos Stirton, 1960
  - †Kolponomos newportensis Tedford et al., 1994
  - †Kolponomos clallamensis Stirton, 1960
- †Allocyon Merriam, 1930
  - †Allocyon loganensis Merriam, 1930
- †Wangictis L. de Bonis et al., 2019
  - †Wangictis tedfordi (Wang & Qiu, 2003) [Pachycynodon tedfordi Wang & Qiu, 2003]
- †Pachycynodon Schlosser, 1888
  - †Pachycynodon tenuis Teilhard de Chardin, 1915
  - †Pachycynodon filholi Schlosser, 1888
  - †Pachycynodon boriei (Filhol, 1876) [Cynodon robustus Filhol, 1876; Pachycynodon gryei (Filhol, 1876); Pachycynodon leymeriei (Filhol, 1876); Pachycynodon curvirostris (Filhol, 1876); Pachycynodon ferratus (Quenstedt, 1885)]
  - †Pachycynodon crassirostris Schlosser, 1888
- †Amphicynodon Filhol, 1881 [Cynodon Aymard, 1848, name already taken by a fish]
  - †Amphicynodon mongoliensis Janovskaja, 1970
  - †Amphicynodon teilhardi (Matthew & Granger, 1924) [Cynodon teilhardi Matthew & Granger, 1924]
  - †Amphicynodon typicus Schlosser, 1888
  - †Amphicynodon chardini Cirot & De Bonis, 1992
  - †Amphicynodon cephalogalinus Teilhard, 1915
  - †Amphicynodon gracilis (Filhol, 1874) [Cynodon gracilis Filhol, 1874]
  - †Amphicynodon crassirostris (Filhol, 1876) [Cynodon crassirostris Filhol, 1874]
  - †Amphicynodon brachyrostris (Filhol, 1876) [Cynodon brachyrostris Filhol, 1876]
  - †Amphicynodon leptorhynchus (Filhol, 1874) [Cynodon leptorhynchus Filhol, 1874]
  - †Amphicynodon velaunus (Aymard, 1846)

=== †Semantoridae Orlov, 1931 ===
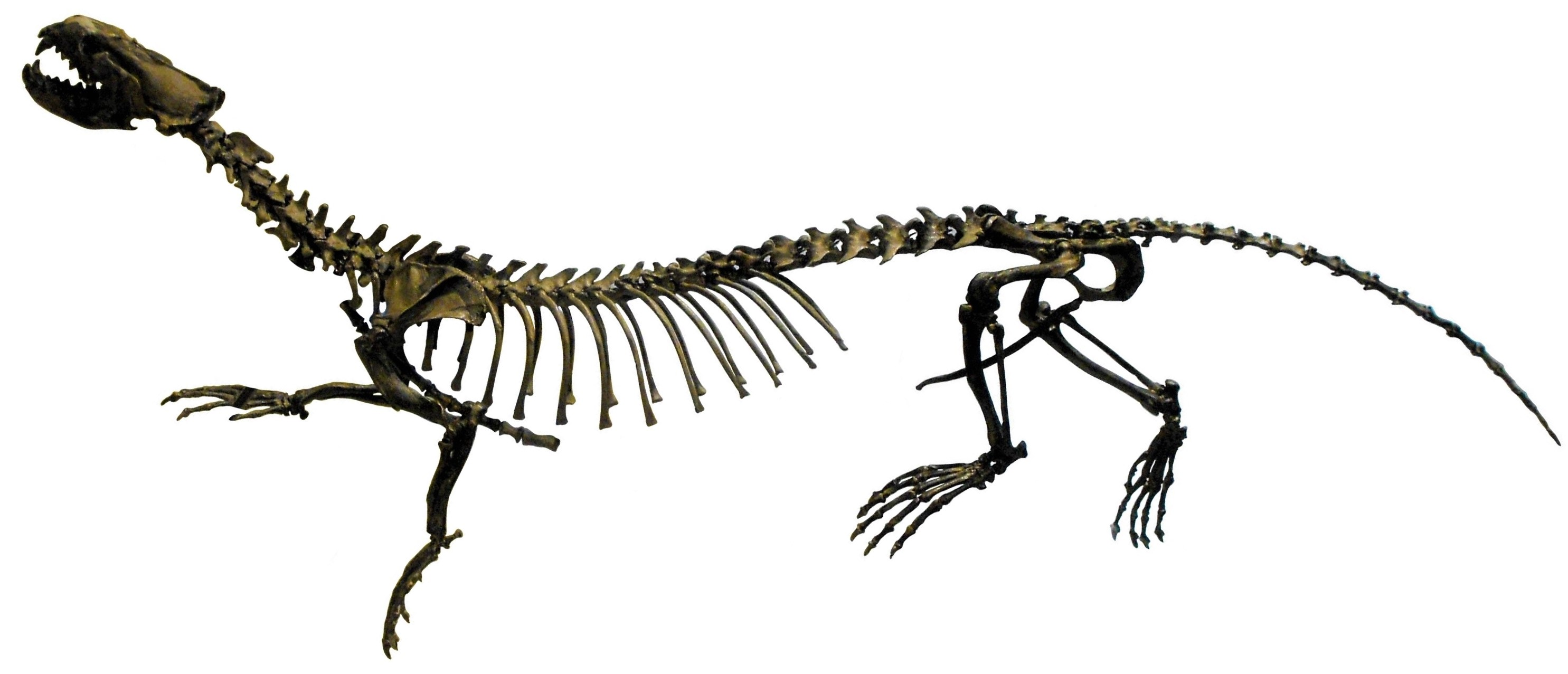
A restored skeleton of the semantorid Puijila darwini

- †Necromites V. V. Bogachev, 1940
  - †Necromites nestoris V. V. Bogachev, 1940
- †Potamotherium Geoffroy, 1833
  - †Potamotherium miocenicum Peters, 1868
  - †Potamotherium valletoni Geoffroy, 1833
- †Puijila Rybczynski et al., 2009
  - †Puijila darwini Rybczynski et al., 2009
- †Semantor Orlov, 1931
  - †Semantor macrurus Orlov, 1931

== Stem-pinniped pinnipedimorphs ==
=== †Enaliarctidae Mitchell & Tedford, 1973 ===
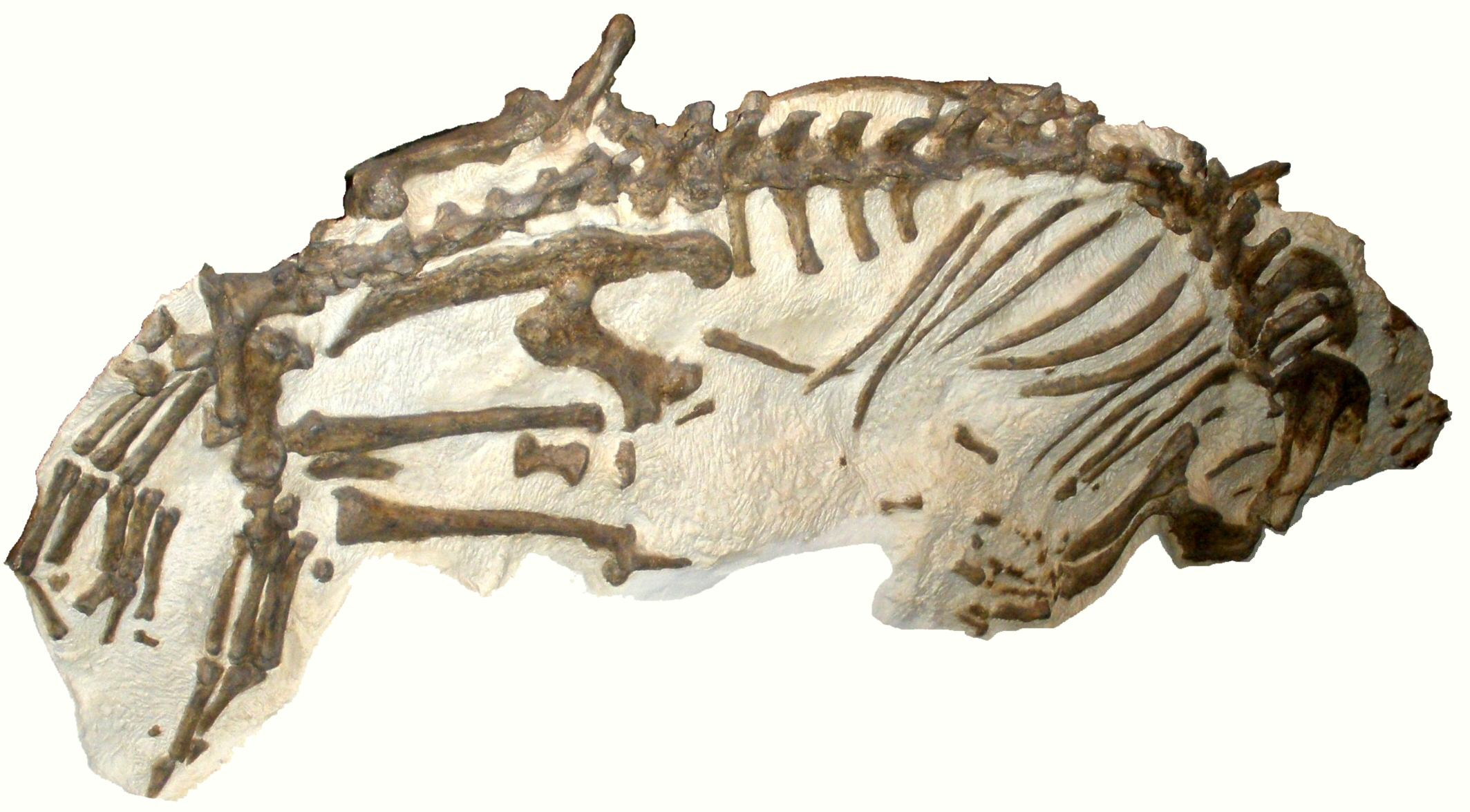
A fossil of Enaliarctos mealsi encased in the matrix

- †Enaliarctos Mitchell & Tedford, 1973
  - †Enaliarctos barnesi Berta, 1991
  - †Enaliarctos mealsi Mitchell & Tedford, 1973
  - †Enaliarctos tedfordi Berta, 1991
  - †Enaliarctos mitchelli Barnes, 1979
  - †Enaliarctos emlongi Berta, 1991

== Stem-pinniped pinnipediforms ==
=== †Pinnarctidion Barnes, 1979 ===
- †Pinnarctidion rayi Berta, 1994
- †Pinnarctidion bishopi Barnes, 1979
- †Pinnarctidion iverseni Everett, Deméré & Wyss, 2023

=== †Pacificotaria Barnes, 1992 ===
- †Pacificotaria hadromma Barnes, 1992

=== †Pteronarctos Barnes, 1989 ===
- †Pteronarctos piersoni Barnes, 1990
- †Pteronarctos goedertae Barnes, 1989

== Pinnipeds ==
=== Phocoidea J.E. Gray, 1821 ===
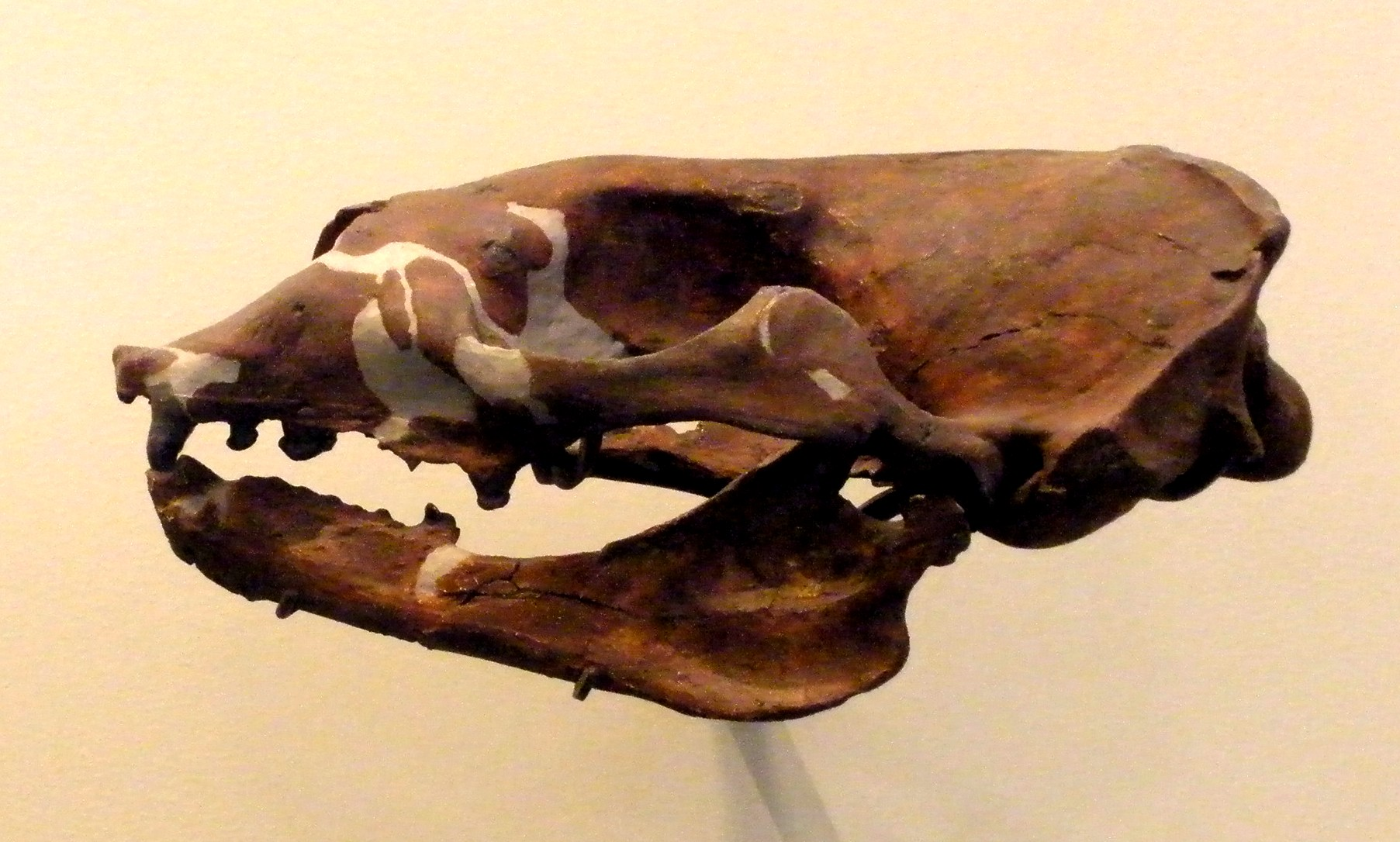
Skull of Piscophoca pacifica

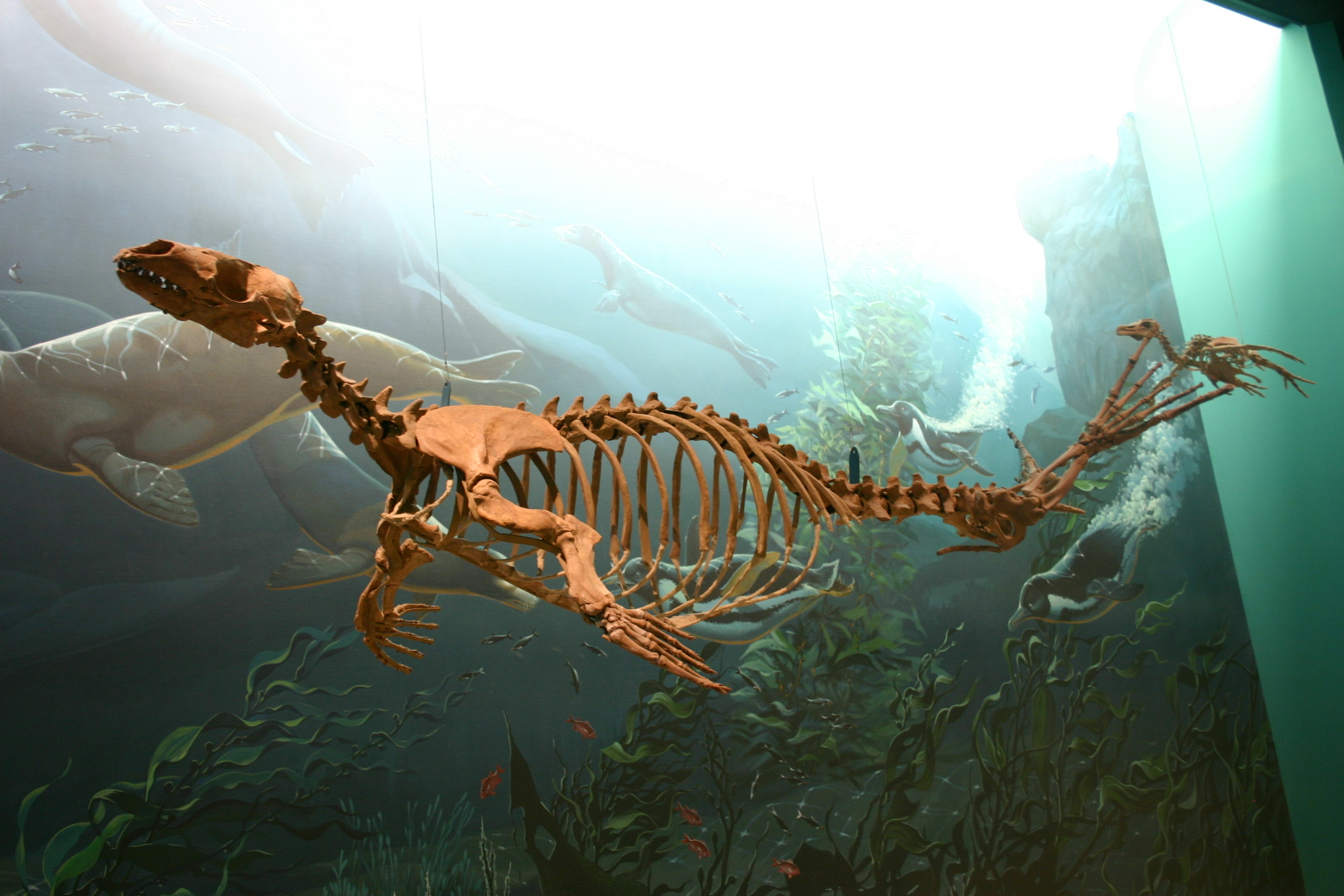
Skeletal mount of Acrophoca longirostris

- Phocidae J. E. Gray, 1821
  - †Noriphoca Dewaele et al., 2018
    - †Noriphoca gaudini (Guiscardi, 1870) [Monotherium gaudini Guiscardi, 1870]
  - †Devinophocinae Koretsky & Holec, 2002
    - †Devinophoca Koretsky & Holec, 2002
      - †Devinophoca emryi Koretsky & Rahmat, 2015
      - †Devinophoca claytoni Koretsky & Rahmat, 2002
  - Monachinae E.L. Trouessart, 1897
    - †Australophoca Valenzuela‐Toro et al., 2016
      - †Australophoca changorum Valenzuela‐Toro et al., 2016
    - †Properiptychus Ameghino, 1897
      - †Properiptychus argentinus Ameghino, 1897
    - †Magnotherium Rahmat et al., 2021
      - †Magnotherium johnsii Rahmat et al., 2021
    - †Afrophoca Koretsky & Domning, 2014
      - †Afrophoca libyca Koretsky & Domning, 2014
    - †Palmidophoca Ginsburg & Janvier, 1975
      - †Palmidophoca callirhoe Ginsburg & Janvier, 1975
    - †Messiphoca Muizon, 1981
      - †Messiphoca mauretanica Muizon, 1981
    - Monachini E. L. Trouessart, 1897
      - †Pliophoca Tavani, 1941
        - †Pliophoca etrusca Tavani, 1941
      - †Eomonachus Rule et al., 2020
        - †Eomonachus belegaerensis Rule et al., 2020
    - Lobodontini J.E. Gray, 1869
      - †Sarcodectes Rule et al., 2020
        - †Sarcodectes magnus Rule et al., 2020
      - †Acrophoca Muizon, 1981
        - †Acrophoca longirostris Muizon, 1981
      - †Icaphoca Dewaele & Muizon, 2025
        - †Icaphoca choristodon Dewaele & Muizon, 2025
      - †Homiphoca Muizon & Hendey, 1980
        - †Homiphoca capensis (Hendey & Repenning, 1972) [Prionodelphis capensis Hendey & Repenning, 1972]
        - †Homiphoca murfreesi Hafed et al., 2022
      - †Kawas Cozzuol, 2001
        - †Kawas benegasorum Cozzuol, 2001
      - †Piscophoca Muizon, 1981
        - †Piscophoca pacifica Muizon, 1981
      - †Hadrokirus Amson & De Muizon, 2013
        - †Hadrokirus martini Amson & De Muizon, 2013
        - †Hadrokirus novotini Hafed et al., 2022
      - †Magophoca Dewaele & de Muizon, 2024
        - †Magophoca brevirostris Dewaele & de Muizon, 2024
  - Phocinae J.E. Gray, 1869
    - †Leptophoca True, 1906
      - †Leptophoca proxima (van Beneden, 1876) [Phoca proxima van Beneden, 1876; Leptophoca lenis True 1906]
    - †Nanophoca Dewaele et al., 2017
      - †Nanophoca vitulinoides (van Beneden, 1871) [Phoca vitulinoides van Beneden, 1871]
    - †Paratethyphoca Otriazhyi et al., 2025
      - †Paratethyphoca Otriazhyi et al., 2025
    - †Phocanella van Beneden, 1877
      - †Phocanella pumila van Beneden, 1877
    - Erignathini Chapski, 1955
      - †Platyphoca van Beneden, 1876
        - †Platyphoca danica Koretsky et al., 2014
        - †Platyphoca vulgaris van Beneden, 1876
    - Phocini J.E. Gray, 1821
      - Histriophoca Gill, 1873
        - †Histriophoca alekseevi Koretsky, 2001
      - †Planopusa Rahmat & Koretsky, 2021
        - †Planopusa semenovi Rahmat & Koretsky, 2021
      - †Praepusa Kretzoi, 1941
        - †Praepusa pannonica Kretzoi, 1941
        - †Praepusa tarchankutica Antoniuk & Koretsky, 1984
      - Phoca Linnaeus, 1758
        - †Phoca moori Newton, 1890

=== Otarioidea J.E. Gray, 1821 ===
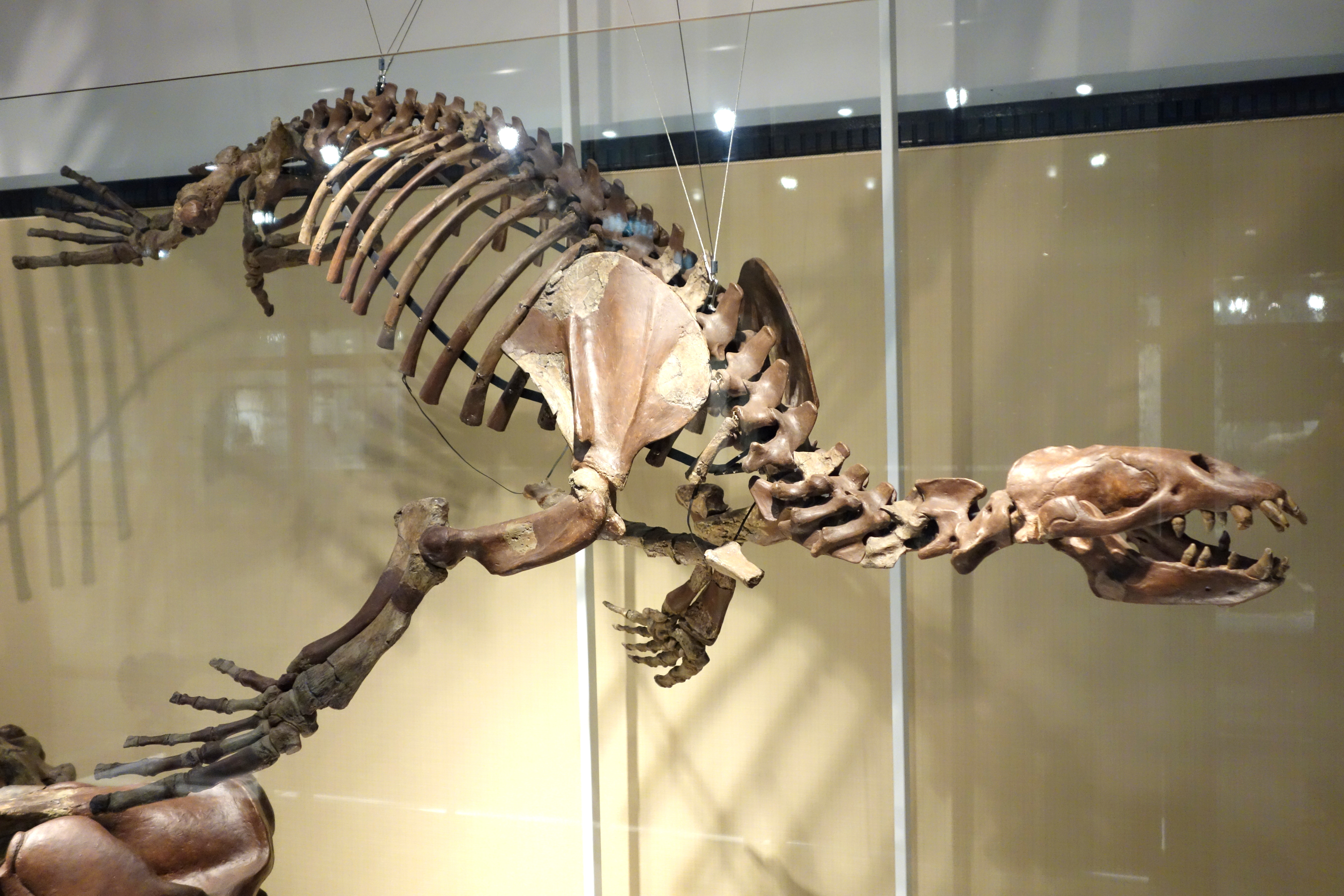
Skeletal mount of Allodesmus sp

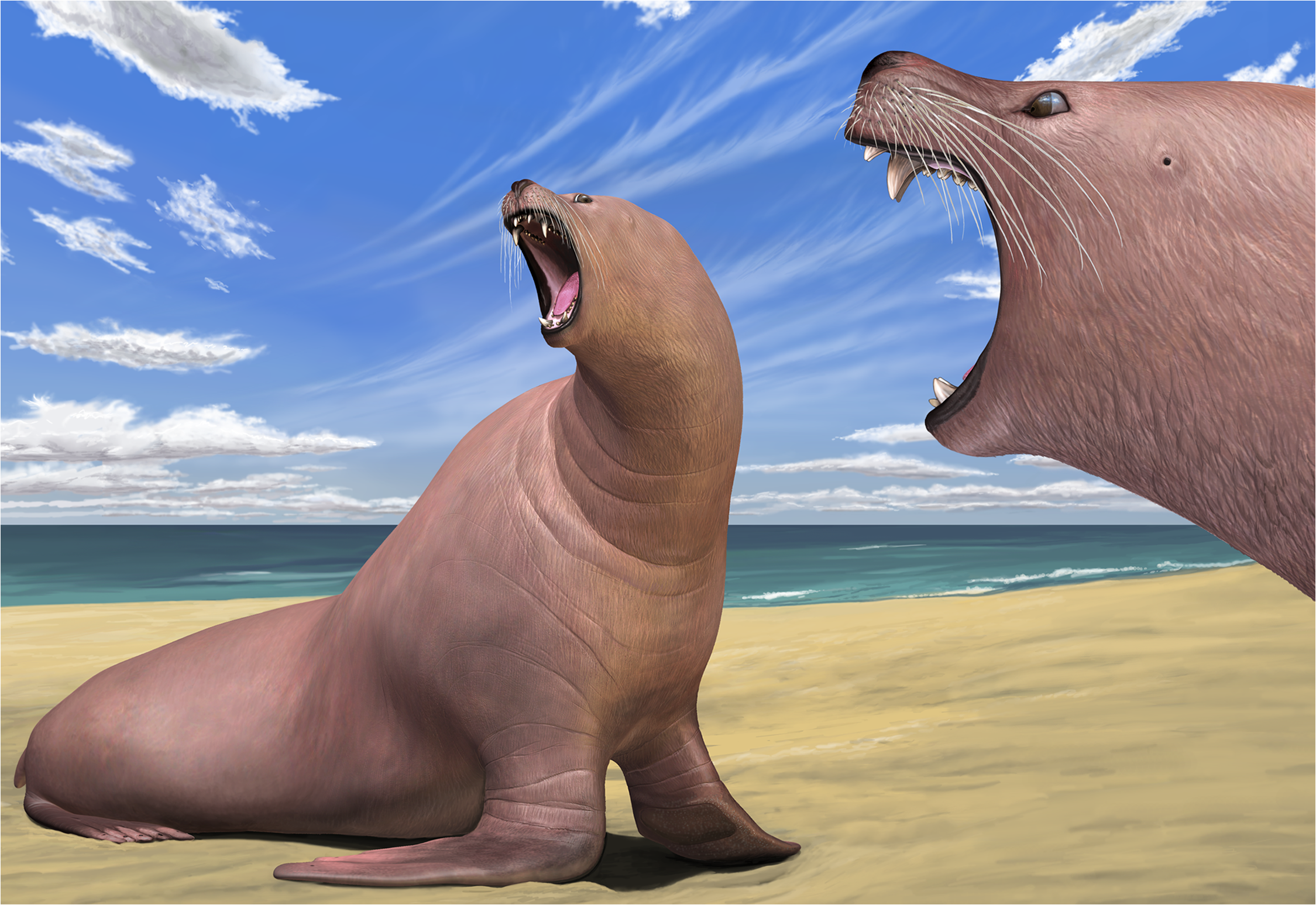
Reconstruction of Archaeodobenus akamatsui by Tatsuya Shinmura (Ashoro Museum of Paleontology)

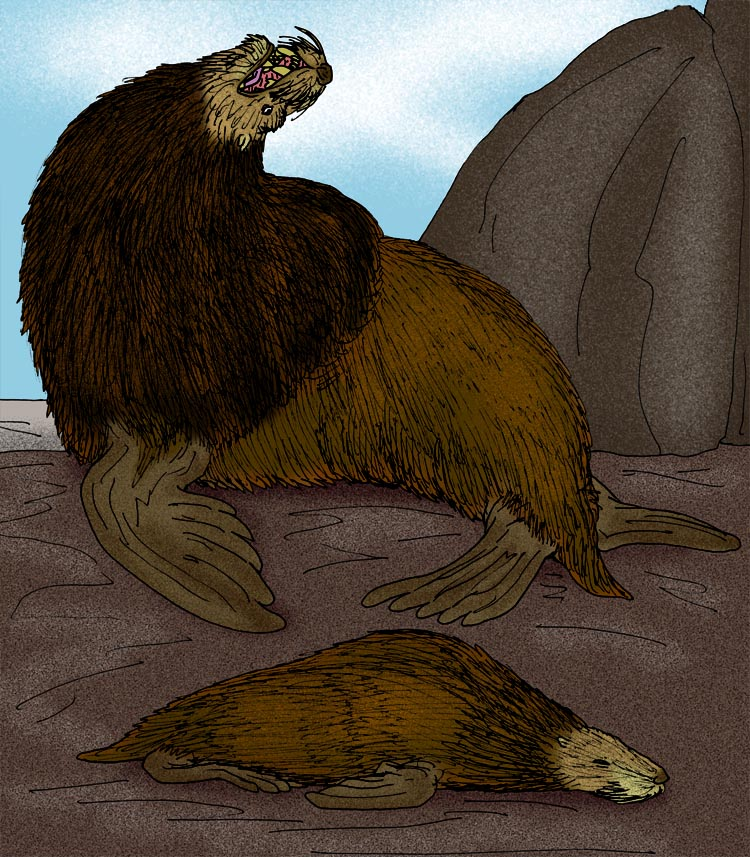
Life restoration of Thalassoleon mexicanus

- †Desmatophocidae Hay, 1930
  - †Eodesmus Tate-Jones et al., 2020
    - †Eodesmus condoni Tate-Jones et al., 2020
  - †Allodesminae Mitchell, 1968
    - †Atopotarus Downs, 1956
      - †Atopotarus courseni Downs, 1956
    - †Allodesmus Kellogg, 1922
      - †Allodesmus packardi Barnes, 1972
      - †Allodesmus uraiporensis Tonomori et al., 2018
      - †Allodesmus naorai Kohno, 1996
      - †Allodesmus sinanoensis Nagao, 1941
      - †Allodesmus demerei Boessenecker & Churchill, 2018
      - †Allodesmus kernensis Kellogg, 1922
  - †Desmatophocinae Hay, 1930
    - †Desmatophoca Condon, 1906
      - †Desmatophoca brachycephala Barnes, 1987
      - †Desmatophoca oregonensis Condon, 1906
- Odobenidae J. A. Allen, 1880
  - †Prototaria Takeyama & Ozawa, 1984
    - †Prototaria planicephala Kohno, 1994
    - †Prototaria primigena Takeyama & Ozawa, 1984
  - †Proneotherium Kohno et al., 1995
    - †Proneotherium repenningi Kohno et al., 1995
  - †Neotherium Kellogg, 1931
    - †Neotherium mirum Kellogg, 1931
  - †Kamtschatarctos Dubrovo, 1981
    - †Kamtschatarctos sinelnikovae Dubrovo, 1981
  - †Pseudotaria Kohno, 2006
    - †Pseudotaria muramotoi Kohno, 2006
  - †Archaeodobenus Tanaka & Kohno, 2015
    - †Archaeodobenus akamatsui Tanaka & Kohno, 2015
  - †Nanodobenus Velez & Salinas-Marquez, 2018
    - †Nanodobenus arandai Velez & Salinas-Marquez, 2018
  - †Pelagiarctos Barnes, 1988
    - †Pelagiarctos thomasi Barnes, 1988
  - †Titanotaria Magallanes et al., 2018
    - †Titanotaria orangensis Magallanes et al., 2018
  - †Imagotaria Mitchell, 1968
    - †Imagotaria downsi Mitchell, 1968
  - †Pontolis True, 1905
    - †Pontolis barroni Biewer, Velez-Juarbe & Parham, 2020
    - †Pontolis kohnoi Biewer, Velez-Juarbe & Parham, 2020
    - †Pontolis magnus (True, 1905) [Pontoleon magnus True, 1905]
  - †Osodobenus Biewer, Velez-Juarbe & Parham, 2020
    - †Osodobenus eodon Biewer, Velez-Juarbe & Parham, 2020
  - Neodobenia Magallanes et al., 2018
    - †Dusignathinae Mitchell, 1968
      - †Gomphotaria Barnes & Rashke, 1991
        - †Gomphotaria pugnax Barnes & Rashke, 1991
      - †Dusignathus Kellogg, 1927
        - †Dusignathus seftoni Deméré, 1994
        - †Dusignathus santacruzensis Kellogg, 1927
    - Odobeninae J. A. Allen, 1880
      - †Aivukus Repenning & Tedford, 1977
        - †Aivukus cedrosensis Repenning & Tedford, 1977
      - †Protodobenus Horikawa, 1995
        - †Protodobenus japonicus Horikawa, 1995
      - †Pliopedia Kellogg, 1921
        - †Pliopedia pacifica Kellogg, 1921
      - †Ontocetus Leidy, 1859
        - †Ontocetus emmonsi Leidy, 1859
        - †Ontocetus posti Boisville, Chatar & Kohno, 2024
      - †Valenictus Mitchell, 1961
        - †Valenictus chulavistensis Deméré 1994
        - †Valenictus imperialensis Mitchell, 1961
        - †Valenictus sheperdi Boessenecker et al., 2024
      - Odobenus Brisson, 1762
        - †Odobenus mandanoensis Tomida, 1989
- Panotariidae Velez-Juarbe, 2017
  - †Eotaria Boessenecker & Churchill, 2015
    - †Eotaria circa Velez-Juarbe, 2017
    - †Eotaria crypta Boessenecker & Churchill, 2015
  - Otariidae J. E. Gray, 1825
    - Callorhinae Muizon, 1978
      - †Pithanotaria Kellogg, 1925
        - †Pithanotaria starri Kellogg, 1925
      - Callorhinus J. E. Gray, 1859
        - †Callorhinus inouei (Kohno, 1992) [Thalassoleon inouei Kohno, 1992]
        - †Callorhinus macnallyae (Repenning & Tedford, 1977) [Thalassoleon macnallyae Repenning & Tedford, 1977]
        - †Callorhinus gilmorei Berta & Deméré, 1986
    - Otariinae J. E. Gray, 1825
      - †Thalassoleon Repenning & Tedford, 1977
        - †Thalassoleon mexicanus Repenning & Tedford, 1977
      - Zalophini J. E. Gray, 1869
        - †Proterozetes Barnes et al., 2006
          - †Proterozetes ulysses Barnes et al., 2006
        - †Oriensarctos Mitchell, 1968
          - †Oriensarctos watasei (Matsumoto, 1925) [Eumetopias watasei Matsumoto, 1925]
      - Otariini J. E. Gray, 1825
        - Otaria Péron, 1816
          - †Otaria fischeri Gervais & Ameghino, 1880
          - †Otaria josefinae Hostos-Olivera et al., 2026
        - Neophoca J. E. Gray, 1866
          - †Neophoca palatina King, 1983
        - †Hydrarctos Muizon, 1978
          - †Hydrarctos lomasiensis Muizon, 1978

== Nomina dubia taxa ==
nomina dubia is a scientific name that is of unknown or doubtful application. In the case of pinnipeds (in particular phocid seals) a lot of fossils are fragmentary, yet given names to known or new taxa based on ecomorphotype groupings. Rule, Burin & Park (2024) find that such categorization is not reliably useful for assigning isolated fossils names and consider the majority of extinct phocid seal species to be nomina dubia. Below is a last of these taxa:

- †Auroraphoca Dewaele et al., 2018
  - †Auroraphoca atlantica Dewaele et al., 2018
- †Batavipusa Koretsky & Peters, 2008
  - †Batavipusa neerlandica Koretsky & Peters, 2008
- †Callophoca van Beneden, 1876
  - †Callophoca obscura van Beneden, 1876
- †Cryptophoca Koretsky & Ray, 1994
  - †Cryptophoca maeotica (Nordmann, 1860) [Monotherium maeotica Koretsky 2001]
- †Frisiphoca Dewaele et al., 2018
  - †Frisiphoca affine (van Beneden, 1876) [Monotherium affine van Beneden, 1876]
  - †Frisiphoca aberratum (van Beneden, 1876) [Monotherium aberratum van Beneden, 1876)]
- †Gryphoca van Beneden, 1877
  - †Gryphoca nordica Koretsky et al., 2014
  - †Gryphoca similis van Beneden, 1877
- †Miophoca Zapfe, 1937
  - †Miophoca vetusta Zapfe, 1937
- †Monachopsis Kretzoi, 1941
  - †Monachopsis pontica (Eichwald, 1850) [Monachus pontica Eichwald, 1850]
- †Monotherium van Beneden, 1876
  - †Monotherium delognii van Beneden, 1876
- †Pachyphoca Koretsky & Rahmat, 2013
  - †Pachyphoca chapskii Koretsky & Rahmat, 2013
  - †Pachyphoca ukrainica Koretsky & Rahmat, 2013
  - †Pachyphoca volkodavi Tarasenko, 2022
- †Pontophoca Kretzoi, 1941
  - †Pontophoca jutlandica Koretsky et al., 2014
  - †Pontophoca sarmatica (Alekseev, 1924) [Phoca sarmatica Alekseev, 1924]
  - †Pontophoca simionescui Kretzoi, 1941
- †Pristiphoca Gervais, 1853
  - †Pristiphoca rugidens (Meyer, 1845) [Monachus rugidens Meyer, 1845]
  - †Pristiphoca occitana Gervais, 1853
- †Prophoca van Beneden, 1876
  - †Prophoca rousseaui van Beneden, 1876
- †Sarmatonectes Koretsky, 2001
  - †Sarmatonectes sintsovi Koretsky, 2001
- †Seronectes Hafed et al., 2024
  - †Seronectes meherrinensis Hafed et al., 2024
- †Terranectes Rahmat et al., 2017
  - †Terranectes parvus Rahmat et al., 2017
  - †Terranectes magnus Rahmat et al., 2017
- †Virginiaphoca Dewaele et al., 2018
  - †Virginiaphoca magurai Dewaele et al., 2018

In addition Rule, Burin & Park (2024) also found some species to be nomen dubium in genera that have species which are not:

- †Leptophoca amphiatlantica Koretsky et al., 2012
- †Praepusa boeska Koretsky et al., 2015
- †Praepusa magyaricus Koretsky, 2003
- †Praepusa vindobonensis (Toula, 1897) [Phoca vindobonensis Toula, 1897]

Dewaele et al. (2026) study the long bone variability of extant earless seals, finding no evidence of consistently clear genus- or species-specific shapes, and note the need for reevaluation of the validity of fossil taxa described on the basis of isolated long bones.

== See also ==
- List of pinniped species
