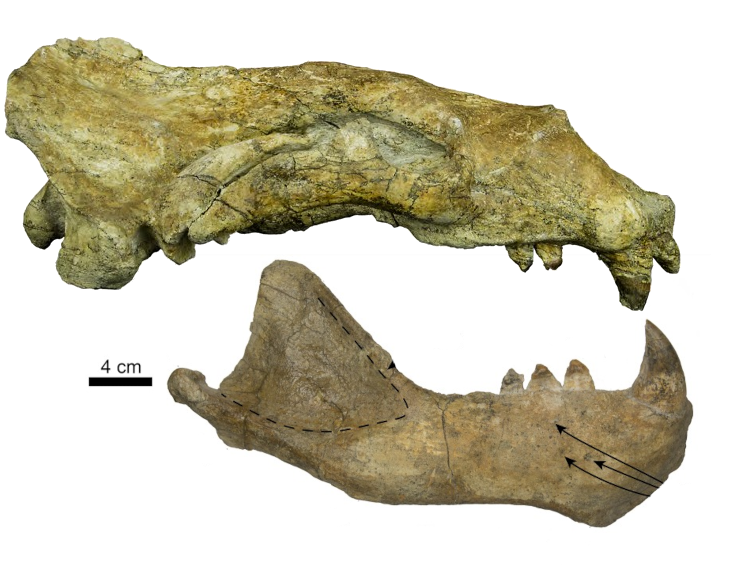
- Holotype skull of Titanotaria orangensis

Scientific classification
- Kingdom: Animalia
- Phylum: Chordata
- Class: Mammalia
- Order: Carnivora
- Parvorder: Pinnipedia
- Family: Odobenidae
- Genus: †Titanotaria; Magallanes et al., 2018
- Species: †T. orangensis

Binomial name
- †Titanotaria orangensis Magallanes et al., 2018

= Titanotaria =

Titanotaria Temporal range: Miocene 6.6–5.8 Ma

Genus of fossil mammals

Titanotaria is a genus of late, basal walrus from the Miocene of Orange County, California. Unlike much later odobenids, it lacked tusks. Titanotaria is known from an almost complete specimen which serves as the holotype for the only recognized species, Titanotaria orangensis, it is the best preserved fossil walrus currently known.

== History and naming ==
Although the holotype specimen (OCPC 11141) of Titanotaria had been discovered in 1993 and represents one of the most complete fossil walrus known, little attention was given to the material for over 20 years. The first mention of the fossils in peer-reviewed literature came in 2017 with Barboza and colleagues publishing a faunal list of the Oso Member of the Capistrano Formation, where Titanotaria had been found. Specifically, the fossilized bones were collected from the town of Lake Forest, Orange County, California, during the construction of the Saddleback Church. A full description followed a year after its mention by Barboza and was led by Isaac Magallanes, who published a detail examination of the fossils alongside a phylogenetic analysis. According to paleontologist Robert Boessenecker, the remains were unofficially known by the name "Waldo".

The name Titanotaria honors the California State University, Fullerton, widely known as the Titans. This was meant to recognize the collaboration between the university and Orange County, which lead to the creation of the John D. Cooper Archaeological and Paleontological Center. The second part of the genus name, otaria, is a reference to the genus Otaria and a commonly used suffix for fossil pinnipeds. The species name means "coming from Orange County".

== Description ==
The holotype skull of Titanotaria belongs to a male individual with an asymmetric skull, likely caused by a healed pathology. The rostrum of Titanotaria is elongated and widens at around the root of the first canine tooth. The premaxilla are triangular in outline and elevated slightly above the tooth row. The front-most tip of the premaxilla is marked by a knob-shaped prenarial process, which is immediately followed by a depression located above the incisors and canines that likely serves as an origin for the lateral nasalis muscle. The nasal bones are long (60% of the rostrum length) with parallel edges and a broad, V-shaped suture with the frontal bone. The zygomatic arch is broad and possesses an oval prominence on its ventral surface. The point of articulation between the jugal and the maxilla is largely fused and a small, triangular postorbital process is present on the jugal element of the zygomatic arch. The frontal bone is widest towards the front of the skull and bears two temporal crests, which fuse to form the sagittal crest. The crest is prominent and long, with a sinuous profile. This differs from the more sloping sagittal crests of other odobenids like Imagotaria and Neotherium. Towards the back of the skull the sagitall crest meets the nuchal crests, which is wide and obscures the occipital region in top view.

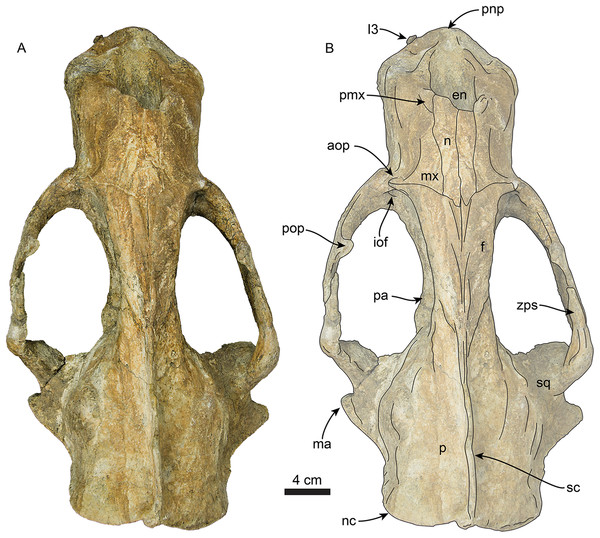
Titanotaria dorsal

The tooth formula of Titanotaria is $\frac{3.1.4.2.}{?.1.4.2.}$. In the upper jaw the incisors are long and slender with an oval crosssection and a single root. The canines are robust, conical and larger than the incisors. While the first premolar likely only possesses a single root based on the morphology of the alveolus, the second is bi-lobed with a bulbous tooth crown. The following teeth also show two tooth roots and there is a decrease in size between the two molars. No incisors are preserved in the lower jaw and their alveoli are obscured by sediment. The mandibular tooth row is very short, only taking up 40% of the mandible. The lower canines are almost as large as their upper counterparts and like them they are robust and conical with a curve to them. Like in the upper jaw, the teeth starting with the second premolar of the mandible are double rooted with bulbous crowns. The last lower molar however appears to have been single rooted based on the anatomy of its tooth socket.

Titanotaria preserves most of its postcranial material; however, only elements relevant to phylogenetic analysis were described. The holotype is only missing few ribs, parts of the right forelimb, most of the pelvis and some of the distal limb elements. It reached a length of 10 ft (3.0 m) and weighed around 1,200 lb (540 kg).

== Phylogeny ==
Phylogenetic analysis found that Titanotaria was a basal odobenid, nesting outside of the clade Neodobenia (named within the same publication as the genus). The same placement was later recovered by Biewer and colleagues when they described Osodobenus.

- - Prototaria primigenia
  - - Proneotherium repenningi
    - - Neotherium mirum
      - Kamtschatarctos sinelnikovae
      - - Pseudotaria muramotoi
        - - Archaeodobenus akamatsui
          - - Pelagiarctos sp.
            - - Titanotaria orangensis
              - - Imagotaria downsi
                - - - Pontolis barroni
                    - - Pontolis magnus
                      - Pontolis kohnoi
                  - - Osodobenus eodon
                    - Neodobenia
                      - Dusignathinae
                        - Gomphotaria pugnax
                        - Dusignathus santacruzensis
                        - Dusignathus seftoni
                      - Odobeninae
                        - Aivukus cedrosensis
                        - - Protodobenus japonicus
                          - Odobenini
                            - Ontocetus emmonis
                            - Valenictus imperialensis
                            - - Valenictus chulavistenis
                              - Odobenus rosmarus

== Paleobiology ==
Titanotaria is known from the Oso Member of the Capistrano Formation, which preserves a rich assemblage of fossil walrus species such as Gomphotaria pugnax, Pontolis magnus, Pontolis kohnoi and Osodobenus eodon. The eared seal Thalassoleon was also found in this formation, alongside giant sea cows, cetotheriid whales, the bizarre Desmostylus, various sharks and the remains of indetermined crocodiles.
