= Osodobenus =

Osodobenus Temporal range: Miocene 6.6–5.8 Ma

Scientific classification
- Kingdom: Animalia
- Phylum: Chordata
- Class: Mammalia
- Order: Carnivora
- Parvorder: Pinnipedia
- Family: Odobenidae
- Genus: †Osodobenus; Biewer et al., 2020
- Species: †O. eodon

Binomial name
- †Osodobenus eodon Biewer et al., 2020

Extinct genus of mammals

Osodobenus is an extinct genus of walrus from the Miocene to Pliocene of California. Osodobenus may have been the first tusked walrus and shows several adaptations that suggest it was a suction feeder, possibly even a benthic feeder like modern species. Three skulls are known showing pronounced sexual dimorphism, with the female lacking the same tusks as the male. Only a single species, Osodobenus eodon, is currently recognized.

== Discovery and naming ==
Osodobenus is known from three specimens including an adult male, adult female and a juvenile specimen preserving skulls and some postcranial material. All the material was collected from the Late Miocene to Early Pliocene (Messinian to Zanclean) Capistrano Formation, Orange County, California alongside the remains of several other early odobenids. In 2020, Biewer and colleagues published a detailed description of the material, establishing Osodobenus as a new genus while also erecting two new species of Pontolis.

The genus name of Osodobenus is a combination of the genus name for the modern walrus "Odobenus" and the Oso Member, a Messinian strata within the Capistrano Formation. The species name eodon translates to "dawn tooth" or "dawn tusk", a reference to this animal's key role in the evolution of walrus tusks.

== Description ==
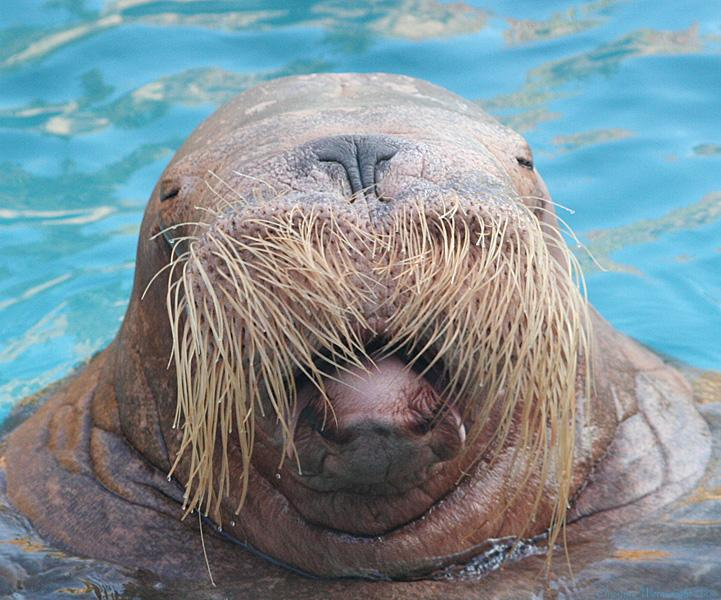
Osodobenus likely had whiskers like the modern walrus.

Compared to other basal odobenids, the rostrum of Osodobenus is short and robust, bulging notably around the canines and with a forward-projecting premaxilla. The nares are large with thick borders and roofed by the nasal bones. The palate is arched and a pair of infraorbital foramen enlarged. The later suggest that much like the modern species, Osodobenus had a mustache-like collection of whiskeres covering the upper lip. Behind the canines, the teeth are single-rooted with inflated bulbous crowns showing little wear. The first two incisors of Osodobenus are transversely compressed with minor wear of the apices. The third incisor is notably longer and slender and there is no cingulum on the inner side of the jaws as in other odobenids. The prominent canines are robust, conical and recurved. Compared to the width of the skull, these canines are approximately 50% larger than those of other basal walrus genera. The pulp cavity is open which indicates that the canines were continuously growing, something only known from tusked odobenids. This however only applies to the males, while the female has smaller canines more proportional to the skull width. This indicates that the presence of tusks in Osodobenus was sexually dimorphic. The teeth of Osodobenus show a somewhat transitional form between the less specialised odobenids with a tooth specialisation score of 0.4 and lower and the more derived and specialised members of the group (score >0.5). This indicates that odobenids rapidly specialised during the late Tortonian to early Messinian of the Miocene, which included the development of tusks in later taxa. This again corresponds to what is observed in Osodobenus, whose canines form an intermediate form between what has previously been considered tusked and tuskless. Biewer and colleagues argue that the continuous nature of tusk growth in an evolutionary context makes a rigid separation futile and that Osodobenus represents the first walrus with canines that could be considered tusks.

== Phylogeny ==
Osodobenus was recovered as a sister taxon to the Neodobenia in both parsimony phylogenetic analysis and Bayesian analyses, which makes it the basalmost walrus with canines that can be considered tusks. The following phylogenetic tree was recovered by the study of Biewer et al. (2020).

- - Prototaria primigenia
  - - Proneotherium repenningi
    - - Neotherium mirum
      - Kamtschatarctos sinelnikovae
      - - Pseudotaria muramotoi
        - - Archaeodobenus akamatsui
          - - Pelagiarctos sp.
            - - Titanotaria orangensis
              - - Imagotaria downsi
                - - - Pontolis barroni
                    - - Pontolis magnus
                      - Pontolis kohnoi
                  - - Osodobenus eodon
                    - Neodobenia
                      - Dusignathinae
                        - Gomphotaria pugnax
                        - Dusignathus santacruzensis
                        - Dusignathus seftoni
                      - Odobeninae
                        - Aivukus cedrosensis
                        - - Protodobenus japonicus
                          - Odobenini
                            - Ontocetus emmonis
                            - Valenictus imperialensis
                            - - Valenictus chulavistenis
                              - Odobenus rosmarus

== Paleobiology ==
Although the presence of tusks is sexually dimorphic in Osodobenus, it is suggested that feeding likewise played a part in the evolution of these enlarged canine teeth. Osodobenus and other tusked odobenids share an enlarged infraorbital foramen, which correspond with the amount of facial nerves that connect to musculature and Vibrissae (whiskers), the later being used by extant seals and sirenians in foraging. Another trait that suggests that Osodobenus may habe been a benthic feeder is the anatomy of the palate, which indicates that this genus much like extant walrus was a specialised suction feeder. Biewer and his colleagues note that these traits alone are not enough to fully establish Osodobenus as a benthic feeder, but argue that its feeding behavior may have been similar regardless. As some more derived odobenids lack these adaptations, it is possible that this ecology was evolved independently from crown walrus.

Fossils of Osodobenus were discovered in the Californian Capistrano Formation, which also yielded the fossils of the walrus Pontolis magnus, Pontolis kohnoi and Titanotaria orangensis. During the Miocene to Pliocene these waters were relatively warm compared to the habitat of the modern walrus and housed a great diversity of mammals including pinnipeds, desmostylians, cetaceans and sirenians like Hydrodamalis cuestae. Crocodylians and sabertoothed salmons are also known to have inhabited the waters of the Capistrano Formation.
