= Capistrano Formation =

Geologic formation in coastal southern Orange County, California

- Stratigraphic range: Miocene to Pliocene 6.6–4.9 Ma
- Type: Formation
- Sub-units: Oso Member, unnamed siltstone member
- Underlies: Niguel Formation
- Overlies: Monterey Formation
- Thickness: 850 m

Lithology
- Primary: Siltstone, Arkose
- Other: Breccia, Mudstone

Location
- Region: Orange County, California
- Country: United States

Type section
- Named for: San Juan Capistrano
- Named by: Alfred Oswald Woodford
- Year defined: 1925
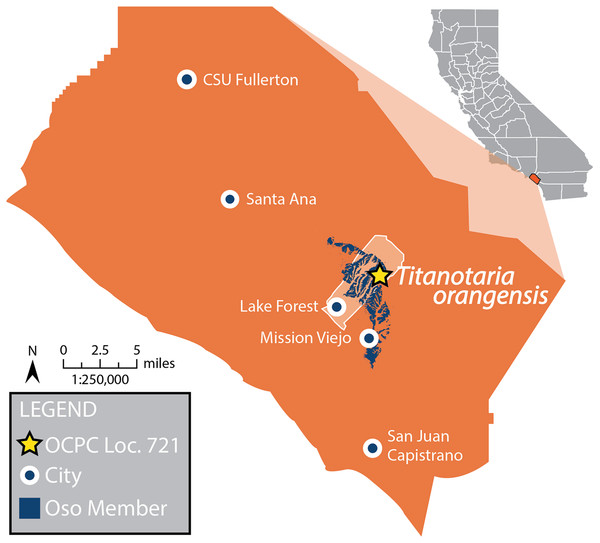
- Outcrops of the Oso Member, with the type locality of Titanotaria highlighted

The Capistrano Formation is a geologic formation in coastal southern Orange County, California. It preserves fossils dating back to the late Miocene to early Pliocene, with the Oso Member representing a near-shore environment. Fifty-nine species and varieties of foraminifera are recognized from the Capistrano Formation alongside a diverse array of marine mammals including up to five species of walrus.

== Geography ==
The Capistrano Formation, named for the town of San Juan Capistrano, is located in southern California, specifically the northern extent of the Peninsular Ranges, which stretch from the Los Angeles Basin to Baja California. It crops out along the coast from Dana Point to San Clemente, and inland for seven miles.

== Geology and Stratigraphy ==
The Capistrano Formation is a heterogenous marine formation that can be differentiated into two distinct but adjacent units. One of these units is the Oso Member, which is composed of arkosic sandstone and preserves a nearshore environment. This unit shows outcrops across Orange County, which are recognizable as medium to coarse grained, white to tan rock. The second member primarily consists of siltstone, preserves an environment that would have been located further out at sea in deeper waters and has not yet been named. At the southwestern border of the Oso Member the two units connect.

Depending on the locality, the Oso Member of the Capistrano Formation either conformably overlies the Puente Formation (specifically Soquel Member), while in other areas it unconformably overlies the Monterey Formation and is succeeded by the Niguel Formation. The Oso Member has been dated to the early late Hemphillian (6.6 to 5.8 Ma) based on the presence of Dinohippus interpolatus and absence of older or younger taxa, but the formation as a whole extends into the Pliocene, rendering the Oso Member coeval with only the lower strata of the unnamed siltstone member. Foraminifers and microfossils have also previously been used to date the formation, which indicate an early Pliocene age (5.6 to 4.9 Ma) for its upper boundary.

== Paleoenvironment ==
The two units of the Capistrano Formation preserve environments of difference distance from the shore. The Oso Member preserves a near-shore environment, thought to be submarine delta deposits situated in a shallow embayment of the Pacific Ocean. The presence of marlin fossils could indicate that parts of the formation deposited at bathyal depths, between 200 and 2.000 meters deep, and Fierstine argues that the preservation of the material suggests that it was not subject to extensive postmortem transportation. He also argues that the presence of this fish suggests warm water temperatures during the Miocene, with Marlins typically preferring average surface temperatures of 24 °C. Barboza and colleagues meanwhile argue that this alone is not sufficient evidence for depth, citing the preservation of marlin fossils in much shallower waters including one specimen found in deposits of the supralittoral zone. The proximity to the shore is apparent due to the presence of terrestrial fauna.

== Paleofauna ==
=== Chondrichthyes ===
Name	Species	Member	Material	Notes	Image
Cosmopolitodus	C. hastalis	Oso Member		also known as the broad-toothed mako	Cosmopolitodus hastalis tooth
Myliobatis	M. sp.	Oso Member		a species of ray	
Otodus	O. megalodon	Oso Member Siltstone Member	teeth		Megalodon restoration

=== Osteichthyes ===
Name	Species	Member	Material	Notes	Image
Acipenseridae indet.		Oso Member		a type of sturgeon	
Makaira	M. nigricans	Oso Member	a nearly complete skull	an early specimen of the extant blue marlin	Blue marlin
Oncorhynchus	O. rastrosus	Oso Member		the sabertoothed salmon	Oncorhynchus rastrosus

=== Reptilia ===
Name	Species	Member	Material	Notes	Image
Crocodilia indet.		Oso Member	A tooth and an osteoderm		
Dermochelyidae indet.		Oso Member			
Testudinidae indet.		Oso Member			

=== Aves ===
Name	Species	Member	Material	Notes	Image
Mancallinae indet.		Oso Member		a type of flightless auk	
Uria	U. sp.				

=== Mammalia ===
==== Afrotheria ====
Name	Species	Member	Material	Notes	Image
Desmostylus	D. sp.	Oso Member			Desmostylus
Hydrodamalis	H. cuestae	Oso Member		a close relative of Steller's Sea Cow	
Proboscidea indet.		Oso Member			

==== Artiodactyla ====
Name	Species	Member	Material	Notes	Image
Antilocapridae indet.		Oso Member			
cf. Balaenoptera	cf. Balaenoptera sp.	Oso Member			
Camelidae indet.		Oso Member			
Delphinidae indet.		Oso Member			
Herpetocetus		Oso Member		a cetotheriid whale	Herpetocetus bramblei
Parapontoporia	P. pacifica	Oso Member	a skull with associated petrotympanic	a relative of the Chinese river dolphin	Parapontoporia sternbergi (left), a related species
Physeteroidea Species A		Oso Member			
Physeteroidea Species B		Oso Member			
Tayassuidae indet.		Oso Member			

==== Carnivora ====
Name	Species	Member	Material	Notes	Image
Borophagus		Oso Member		a large genus of canid	Borophagus skull
Mustelidae indet.		Oso Member			
Gomphotaria	G. pugnax	Oso Member		a species of walrus	Gomphotaria pugnax life restoration
Osodobenus	O. eodon	Oso Member	three skulls representing an adult male, adult female and juvenile specimen	the first known walrus with tusks	
Pontolis	cf. P. magnus P. kohnoi	Oso Member		a giant early walrus	Pontolis magnus mandible
Thalassoleon	T. mexicanus	Siltstone Member	multiple skulls and postcranial material	a basal eared seal	Thalassoleon mexicanus skull
Titanotaria	T. orangensis	Oso Member	skull and postcranial material of multiple individuals	a basal walrus	Lateral view of Titanotaria orangensis

==== Lagomorpha ====
Name	Species	Member	Material	Notes	Image
Leporidae indet.		Oso Member			

==== Perissodactyla ====
Name	Species	Member	Material	Notes	Image
Dinohippus	D. interpolatus	Oso Member	isolated teeth		
Rhinocerotidae indet.		Oso Member			

== See also ==
- Neogene California
- List of fossiliferous stratigraphic units in California
- Paleontology in California
