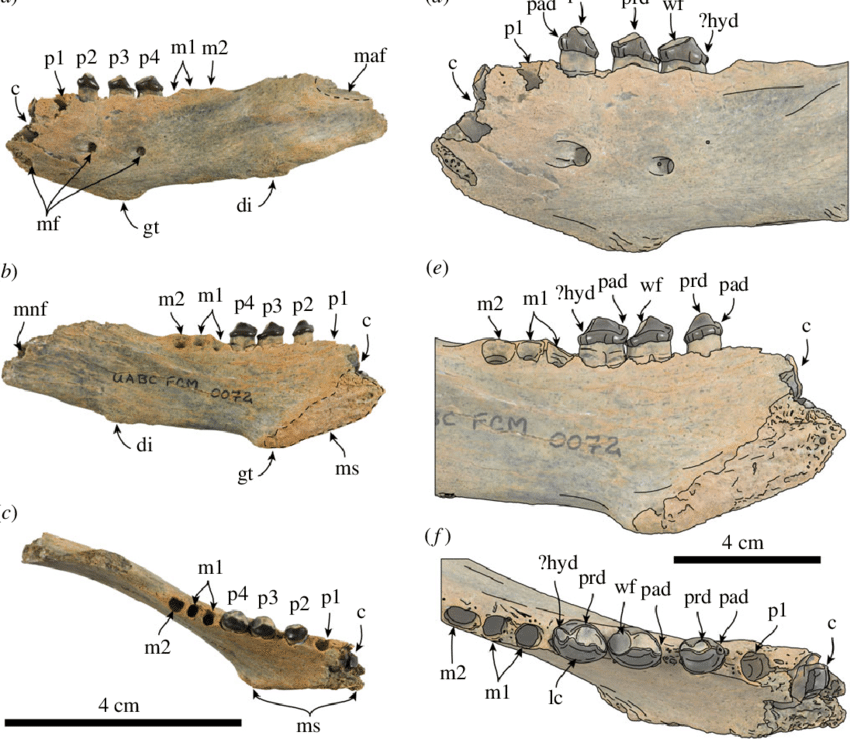
- The left mandibular fossil of N. arandai, including articulated teeth

Scientific classification
- Kingdom: Animalia
- Phylum: Chordata
- Class: Mammalia
- Order: Carnivora
- Parvorder: Pinnipedia
- Family: Odobenidae
- Genus: †Nanodobenus; Velez & Salinas-Marquez, 2018
- Species: †N. arandai

Binomial name
- †Nanodobenus arandai Velez & Salinas-Marquez, 2018

= Nanodobenus =

Nanodobenus Temporal range: Early Miocene, 15.97–7.246 Ma

Extinct genus of pinniped

Nanodobenus is an extinct genus of pinniped that lived approximately 15.97 to 7.246 mya during the Miocene in what is now Baja California Sur, Mexico. It belonged to the family Odobenidae, the only extant species of which is the walrus.

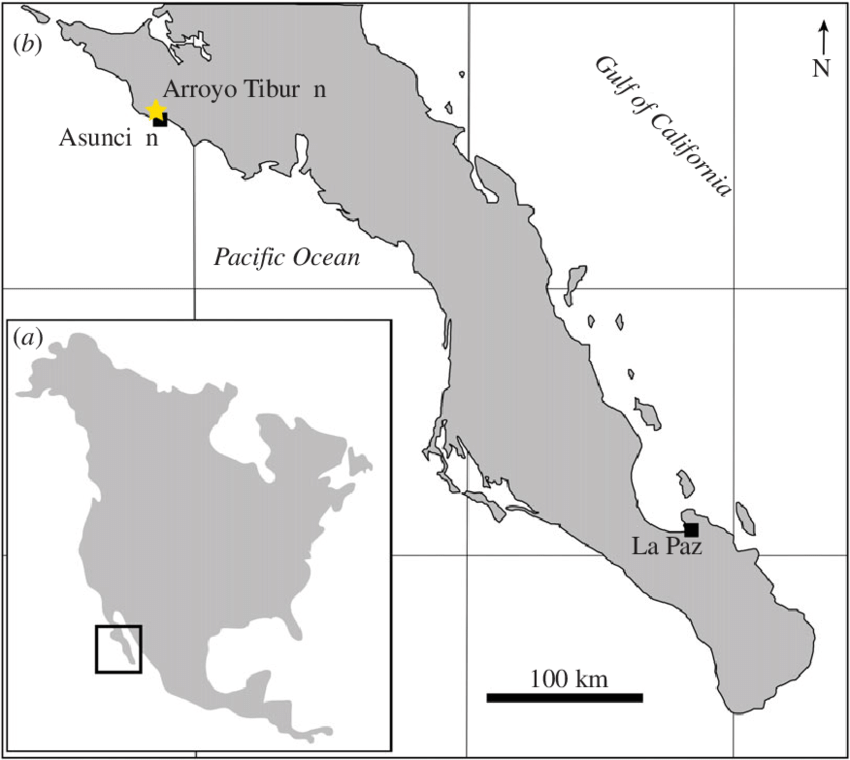
A map of the area where Nanodobenus fossils were discovered

== Discovery ==
N. arandai is known from a partially complete left mandible and a right calcaneum bone, discovered in the Torgugas Formation in Mexico.

== Description ==
Nanodobenus were more similar in appearance to modern fur seals and sea lions than walruses. They lacked the long tusks of walruses, and were more slender and smaller than their modern relatives.

Despite the general increase in body size of odobenids from the Miocene to Pliocene, Nanodobenus were the smallest members of Odobenidae. Individuals were likely around 1.65 metres (5.4 ft) long, indicating the possibility that this genus occupied a different niche from contemporary odobenids.

== Taxonomy ==
Nanodobenus is a relatively basal species of odobenid.

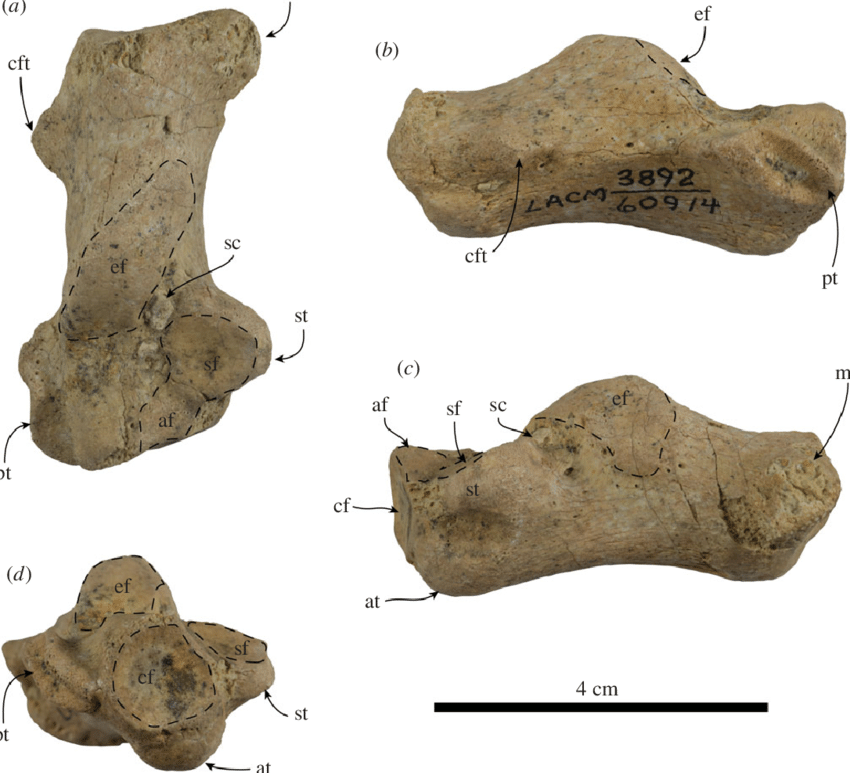
A right calcaneum bone referred to N. arandai
