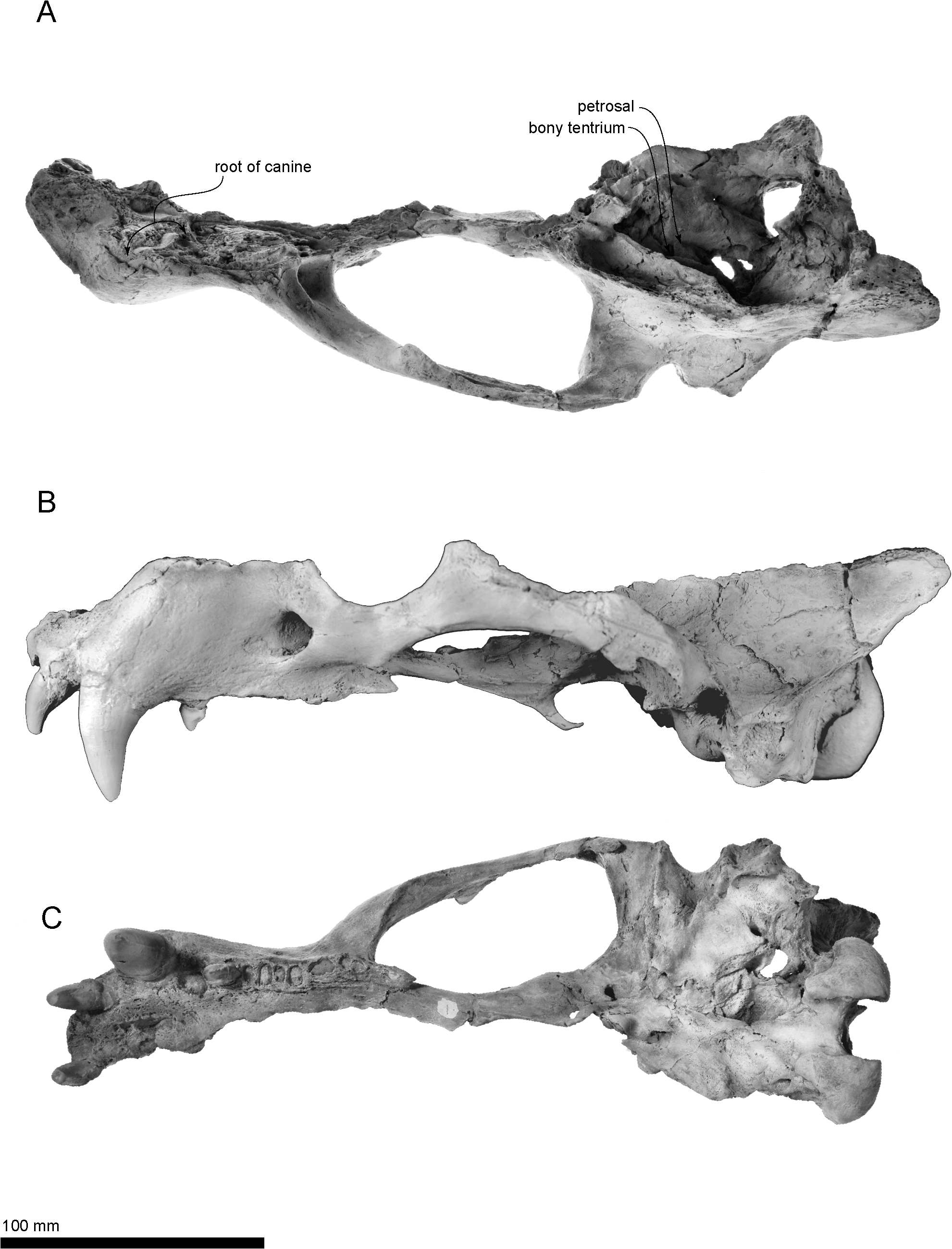
- Partial holotype cranium shown from above, the left side, and below

Scientific classification
- Kingdom: Animalia
- Phylum: Chordata
- Class: Mammalia
- Order: Carnivora
- Parvorder: Pinnipedia
- Family: Odobenidae
- Genus: †Archaeodobenus; Tanaka & Kohno, 2015
- Species: †A. akamatsui

Binomial name
- †Archaeodobenus akamatsui Tanaka & Kohno, 2015

= Archaeodobenus =

Archaeodobenus Temporal range: Late Miocene

Extinct genus of carnivores

Archaeodobenus is an extinct genus of pinniped that lived during the Late Miocene of what is now Japan. It belonged to the Odobenidae family, which is today only represented by the walrus, but was much more diverse in the past, containing at least 16 genera.

== Taxonomy ==
The first known specimen was collected in 1977 from the Ichibangawa Formation in Tobetsu Town on the island of Hokkaido. The specimen consists of a partial skull, vertebrae, and limb bones, and was made the holotype specimen of the new genus and species A. akamatsui by the Japanese palaeontologists Yoshihiro Tanaka and Naoki Kohno in 2015. The generic name consists of archaio-, the Greek word for ancient, and the generic name of the walrus, Odobenus; in full, "ancient walrus". The specific name honors Morio Akamatsu, a curator of the Hokkaido Museum.

=== Evolution ===
The diversity of odobenids increased during the Late Miocene and Pliocene (about 12.5 million to 10.5 million years ago), perhaps linked to marine regression and transgression, which could have geographically isolated their ancestors. Archaeodobenus was the contemporary of the odobenid Pseudotaria from the same formation, which it may have diverged from in the western North Pacific during the Late Miocene. Archaeodobenus appears to have been closer related to later odobenids such as Imagotaria, Pontolis, the subfamily Odobeninae, whereas Pseudotaria seems to have been more basal.

== Description ==
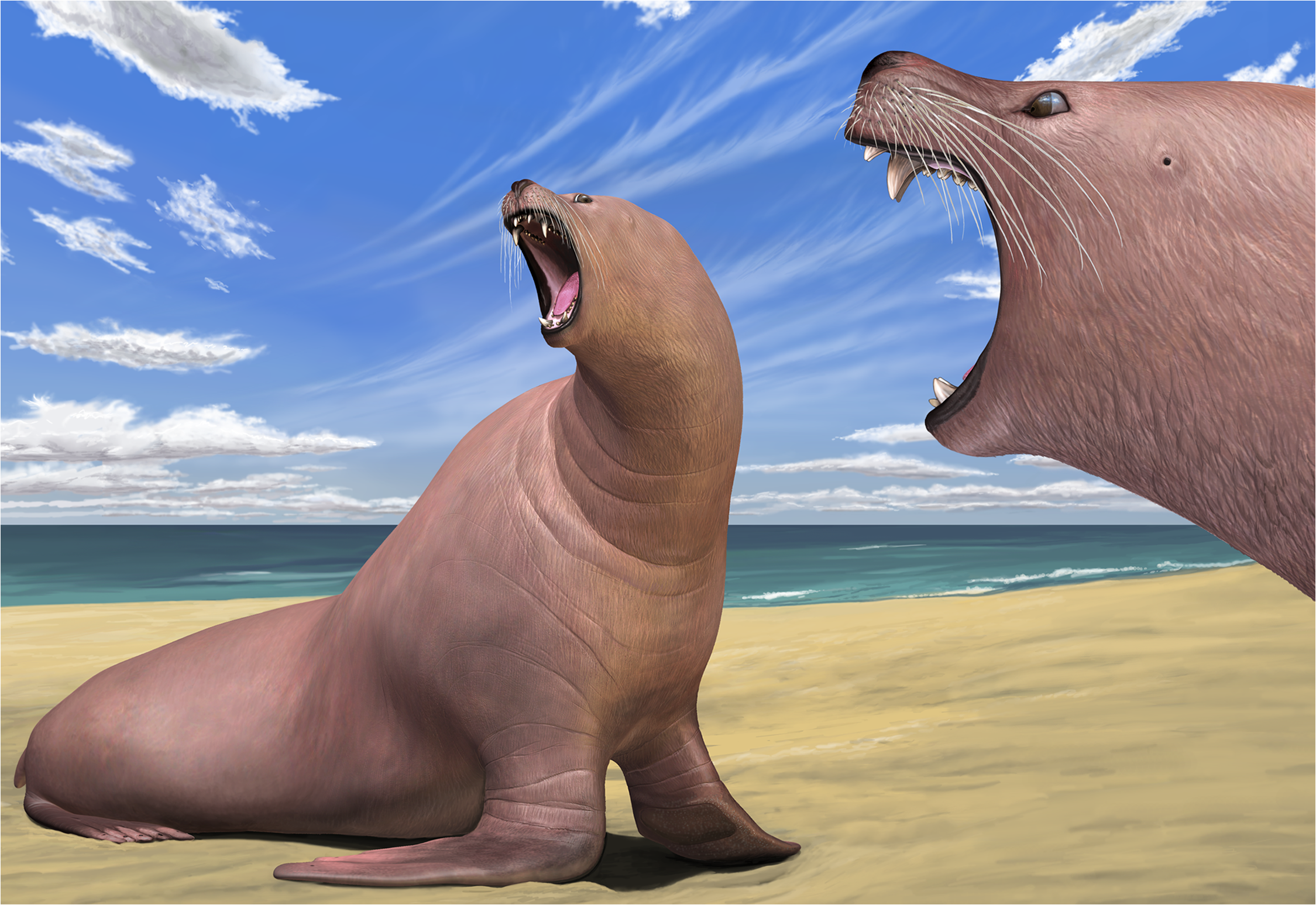
Life restoration of a pair

Unlike the modern walrus, Archaeodobenus did not have tusks but instead had canines of moderate size, and looked more like a sea lion. The holotype specimen appears to have been a young adult male of about 3 metres (9.8 feet) in length, which would have weighed around 473 kg (1,043 lb). This is intermediate between the size of the Steller sea lion and the South American sea lion. Its canines were 86.3 mm (3.40 in) long, compared to modern walrus tusks, which can grow to up to 1 m (3 ft 3 in) long. Archaeodobenus can be distinguished from Pseudotaria by features such as the shape and size of the occipital condyle (which connects with the first neck vertebra at the back of the skull), the foramen magnum (the opening through which the spinal cord passes into the cranium), the mastoid process (where various muscles attach to the back of the skull), and some features in the postcranial skeleton.
