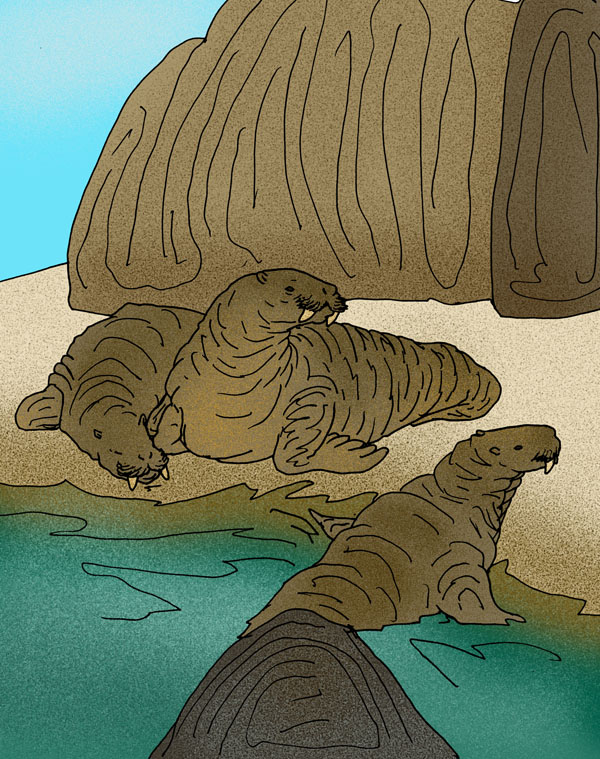
- Pliopedia pacifica

Scientific classification
- Kingdom: Animalia
- Phylum: Chordata
- Class: Mammalia
- Order: Carnivora
- Parvorder: Pinnipedia
- Family: Odobenidae
- Genus: †Pliopedia; Kellogg, 1921
- Species: †P. pacifica

Binomial name
- †Pliopedia pacifica Kellogg, 1921

= Pliopedia =

Pliopedia Temporal range: Late Miocene

Extinct species of carnivore

Pliopedia pacifica is an extinct species of walrus found in what is now Central Valley, California, United States, which lived during the late Miocene. It was an amphibious carnivore.

== Discovery ==
The holotype specimen (USNM 13627) was collected in 1909 by Robert Anderson, and consists of pieces of both forelimbs.

Known Pliopedia fossils include a humerus, pieces of radius and ulna from both forelimbs, metacarpals, metatarsals, and phalanges. They were discovered in the Paso Robles Formation of San Luis Obispo County, California.
