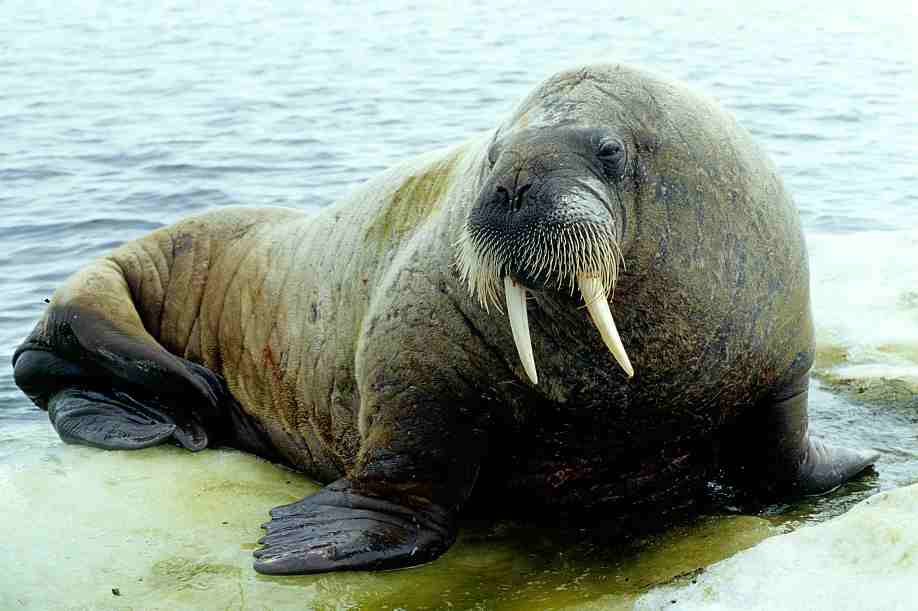

Scientific classification
- Kingdom: Animalia
- Phylum: Chordata
- Class: Mammalia
- Infraclass: Placentalia
- Order: Carnivora
- Parvorder: Pinnipedia
- Superfamily: Otarioidea
- Family: Odobenidae; Allen, 1880

Genera
- Odobenus (walrus) (see text for extinct genera)

= Odobenidae =

Odobenidae Temporal range: Middle Miocene to present

Seal family which includes the walrus

Odobenidae is a family of pinnipeds, of which the only extant species is the walrus (Odobenus rosmarus). In the past, the group was much more diverse, and includes more than a dozen fossil genera.

== Taxonomy ==
All genera except Odobenus are extinct.

- †Archaeodobenus
- †Prototaria
- †Proneotherium
- †Nanodobenus
- †Neotherium
- †Imagotaria
- †Kamtschatarctos
- †Pelagiarctos
- †Pontolis
- †Pseudotaria
- †Titanotaria
- Clade Neodobenia
  - †Gomphotaria
  - Subfamily Dusignathinae
    - †Dusignathus
  - Subfamily Odobeninae
    - †Aivukus
    - †Ontocetus
    - †Pliopedia
    - †Protodobenus
    - †Valenictus
    - Odobenus

In re-analyzing Pelagiarctos, Boessenecker et al. (2013) proposed the phylogenetic relationships of Odobenidae as follows (this analysis excluded Archaeodobenus, Titanotaria, Nanodobenus, and Pliopedia; and included Enaliarctos, Pteronarctos, Allodesmus, Desmatophoca, Callorhinus, Monachus, and Erignathus):

- - Enaliarctos emlongi †
  - - Pteronarctos goedertae †
    - - Desmatophocidae
        - Allodesmus gracilis †
        - Desmatophoca oregonensis †
      - Otariidae
        Callorhinus ursinus
      - Phocidae
        - Monachus monachus
        - Erignathus barbatus
      - Imagotariinae
        - Prototaria primigenia †
        - - Proneotherium regenningi †
          - - Neotherium mirum †
            - Kamtschatarctos sinelnikovae †
            - - Pseudotaria muramotoi †
              - - - Pelagiarctos sp. †
                  - Imagotaria downsi †
                - - Pontolis magnus †
                  - - Dusignathinae
                      - Dusignathus santacruzensis †
                      - Gomphotaria pugnax †
                      - Dusignathus seftoni †
                    - Odobeninae
                      - Aivukus cedrosensis †
                      - - Protodobenus japonicus †
                        - - Ontocetus †
                          - - Valenictus chulavistensis †
                            - Odobenus rosmarus
