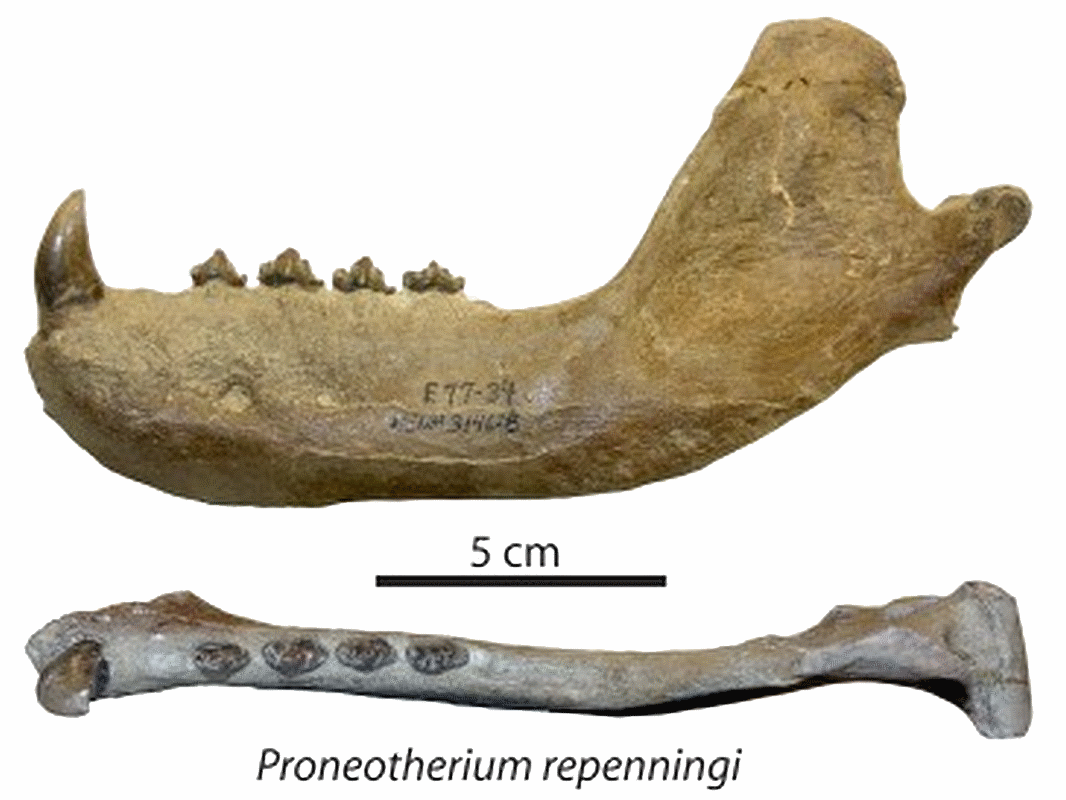

Scientific classification
- Kingdom: Animalia
- Phylum: Chordata
- Class: Mammalia
- Order: Carnivora
- Parvorder: Pinnipedia
- Family: Odobenidae
- Genus: †Proneotherium; Kohno et al., 1995
- Species: †P. repenningi

Binomial name
- †Proneotherium repenningi Kohno et al., 1995

= Proneotherium =

Proneotherium Temporal range: Early Miocene, 20.43–15.97 Ma

Extinct genus of pinniped

Proneotherium is an extinct genus of pinniped that lived approximately 20.43 to 15.97 mya during the Early Miocene in what is now Oregon, U.S. It belonged to the family Odobenidae, the only extant species of which is the walrus.

== Discovery ==
Four specimens of Proneotherium were discovered in the Astoria Formation of Lincoln County, Oregon, U.S. These specimens included cranial and postcranial remains and are all believed to be adult male animals.

== Description ==
Proneotherium was more similar in appearance to modern fur seals and sea lions than walruses. They lacked the long tusks of walruses, and were more slender and smaller than their modern relatives.

Autapomorphies of Proneotherium fossils include a continuous, horizontal crest connecting the mastoid and paroccipital processes of the skull. The teeth are also less secodont in function and appearance than more basal species. This likely represents the slow shift from a piscivorous diet to the mollusk-based diet of modern walruses. The hindlimbs of Proneotherium also show the beginnings of evolutionary shifts from a terrestrial lifestyle to a more aquatic one.

== Taxonomy ==
Proneotherium represents some of the most basal members of Odobenidae. The sister group is the closely related Prototaria.
