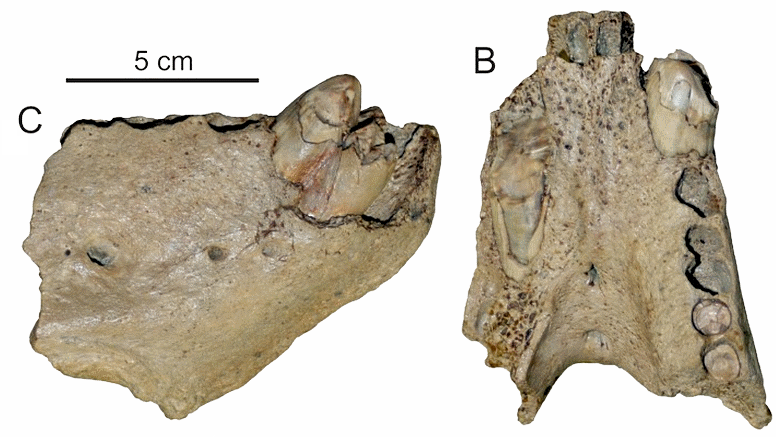

Scientific classification
- Kingdom: Animalia
- Phylum: Chordata
- Class: Mammalia
- Order: Carnivora
- Parvorder: Pinnipedia
- Family: Odobenidae
- Genus: †Pelagiarctos; Barnes, 1988

Type species
- †Pelagiarctos thomasi Barnes, 1988

= Pelagiarctos =

Pelagiarctos Temporal range: Mid Miocene

Extinct genus of carnivores

Pelagiarctos was a genus of walrus that lived during the Middle Miocene, approx. 13-15 mya. Its fossilised remains have been found in the Sharktooth Hill Bonebed, in Kern County, California. It was originally described as an Otariidae, though it is now usually considered to be a basal Odobenidae.

== Anatomy ==
To date, the only material of Pelagiarctos that has been found includes a handful of partial mandibles. The mandibles themselves are approximately the same size as those of the contemporaneous pinniped Allodesmus kernensis, but differ in that the cheek teeth have two roots (instead of one, as in Allodesmus) and that the dentary itself is much thicker. They are also highly vascularized and covered in unusually large mental foramina, indicating that Pelagiarctos may have had somewhat fleshy lips. The cheek teeth resemble those of several terrestrial carnivores, specifically borophagine dogs and hyaenids. This, coupled with the robust dentary, indicates that Pelagiarctos probably had a large bite force. Though no postcranial remains have yet been found, the size of the dentary suggests an overall length of approx. 2.5–3 meters.

== Environment ==
The remains of Pelagiarctos have so far only been discovered in the Sharktooth Hill Bonebed, located in Kern County, California. The bonebed is approximately 15.97 - 13.65 million years old, and is interpreted to have been laid down in a coastal environment off the shore of the Miocene North Pacific.

The sediments that have yielded Pelagiarctos have also yielded numerous other species of ocean-going vertebrates, including sharks (Isurus, Sphyrna, Carcharocles), turtles (Psephophorus), seabirds (Osteodontornis, Diomedea, Puffinus), Cetaceans (Prosqualodon, Aulophyseter, Parietobalaena) and other pinnipeds (Allodesmus, Neotherium).

== Paleobiology ==
Because of its large size, adaptations geared toward crunching bones, and rarity in the fossil record, Pelagiarctos is formerly interpreted as being a predator of other large marine vertebrates. If so, it would make Pelagiarctos unique among pinnipeds, as most other species are adapted to much smaller prey such as fish or squid. Pelagiarctos most likely preyed upon the pinniped Allodesmus (which was very common in its environment), but it could also have preyed upon other marine mammals such as Metaxytherium or Paleoparadoxia. But in a 2014 study indicates that it was not an apex predator.

The enamel structure of Pelagiarctos thomasi consists of undulating Hunter-Schreger bands, which indicate that the pinniped was not adapted for crushing hard objects and instead points to a generalist diet.
