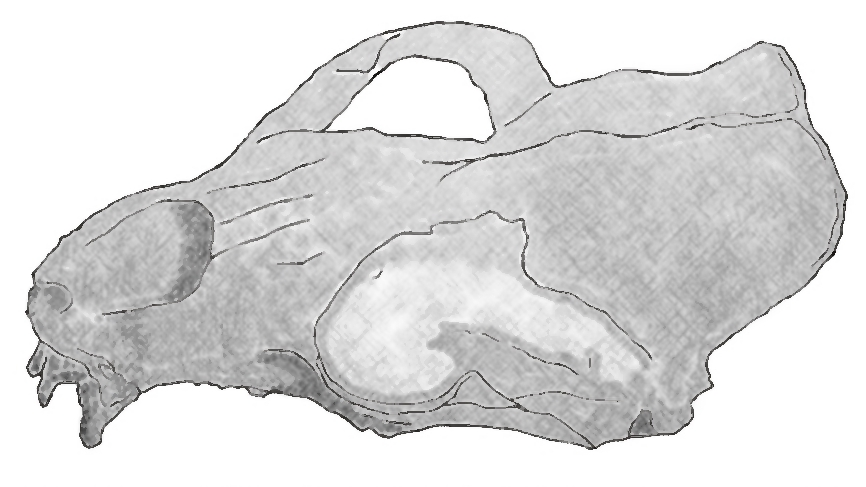

Scientific classification
- Kingdom: Animalia
- Phylum: Chordata
- Class: Mammalia
- Order: Carnivora
- Parvorder: Pinnipedia
- Family: Odobenidae
- Genus: †Prototaria; Takeyama & Ozawa, 1984

Type species
- †Prototaria primigena Takeyama & Ozawa, 1984

Other species
- †P. planicephala Kohno, 1994

= Prototaria =

Prototaria Temporal range: Middle Miocene, 15.97–13.65 Ma

Extinct genus of pinniped

Prototaria is an extinct genus of pinniped that lived approximately 15.97 to 13.65 mya during the Middle Miocene in what is now Japan. It belonged to the family Odobenidae, the only extant species of which is the walrus. Members of the genus Prototaria are believed to be the most basal imagotariine pinnipeds.

Unlike their closest living relative, the walrus, members of Prototaria were primarily piscivorous carnivores.

== Description ==
Prototaria were more similar in appearance to modern fur seals and sea lions than walruses. They did not have long tusks as walruses do, and were more slender.

Fossils ascribed to Prototaria exhibit some autapomorphies, including: a large antorbital process and orbit, and a relatively narrow intertemporal region of the skull. P. planicephala has a wider rostrum than P. primigena as well as more specialized cheek teeth and a flatter tympanic bulla.

== Taxonomy ==
The type species of Prototaria is P. primigena. Based on skeletal traits and various autapomorphies, Naoki Kohno concluded that P. planicephala is more derived than P. primigena.
