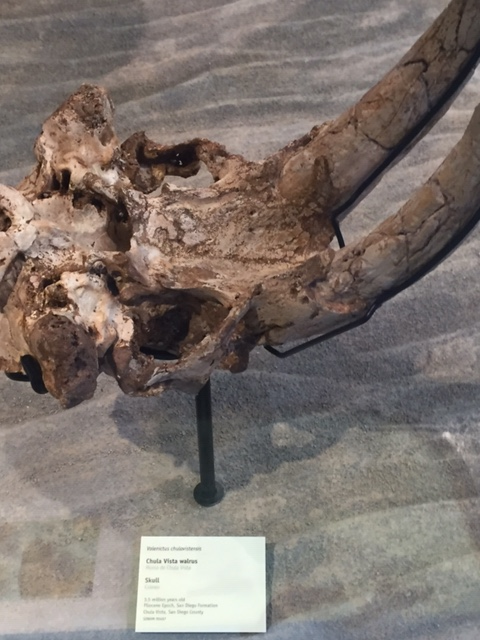
- Underside of skull

Scientific classification
- Kingdom: Animalia
- Phylum: Chordata
- Class: Mammalia
- Order: Carnivora
- Parvorder: Pinnipedia
- Family: Odobenidae
- Subfamily: Odobeninae
- Genus: †Valenictus; Mitchell, 1961

Species
- †V. chulavistensis †V. imperialensis †V. sheperdi

= Valenictus =

Valenictus Temporal range: Pliocene

Extinct genus of carnivores

Valenictus is an extinct genus of Odobenidae from the Pliocene of California.

== Discovery and naming ==
Valenictus sheperdi was discovered in 2024 from the Purisima Formation in Santa Cruz, California. The fossil was discovered by thirteen-year-old amateur paleontologist Forrest Sheperd, from whom the specific name is derived.

== Description ==
Valenictus is related to the modern-day walrus, but lacked all teeth both in the lower and upper jaw except for the two tusks.
