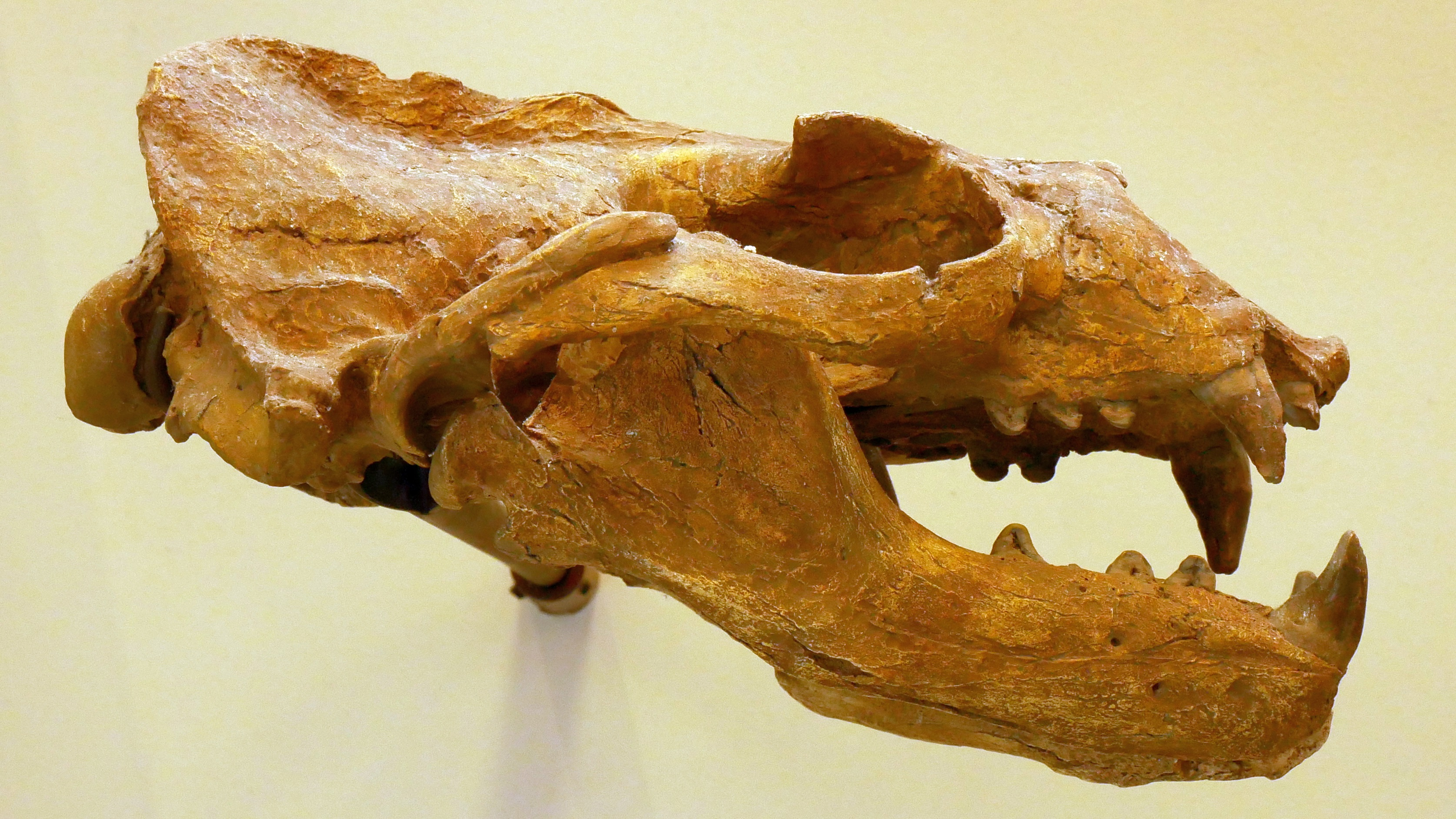
- Thalassoleon mexicanus

Scientific classification
- Kingdom: Animalia
- Phylum: Chordata
- Class: Mammalia
- Order: Carnivora
- Parvorder: Pinnipedia
- Family: Otariidae
- Genus: †Thalassoleon; Repenning and Tedford, 1977

Type species
- †Thalassoleon mexicanus Repenning and Tedford, 1977

Species
- T. mexicanus; T. macnallyae; T. inouei?

= Thalassoleon =

Thalassoleon Temporal range: Late Miocene

Extinct genus of carnivores

Thalassoleon ("sea lion", from Greek: thalassa, the sea; and leon, lion) is an extinct genus of large fur seal. Thalassoleon inhabited the Northern Pacific Ocean in latest Miocene and early Pliocene. Fossils of T. mexicanus are known from Baja California and southern California. T. macnallyae is known from central California, and T. inouei (which may be a synonym of T. macnallyae) is known from Japan. Thalassoleon could be the ancestor of the modern northern fur seal.

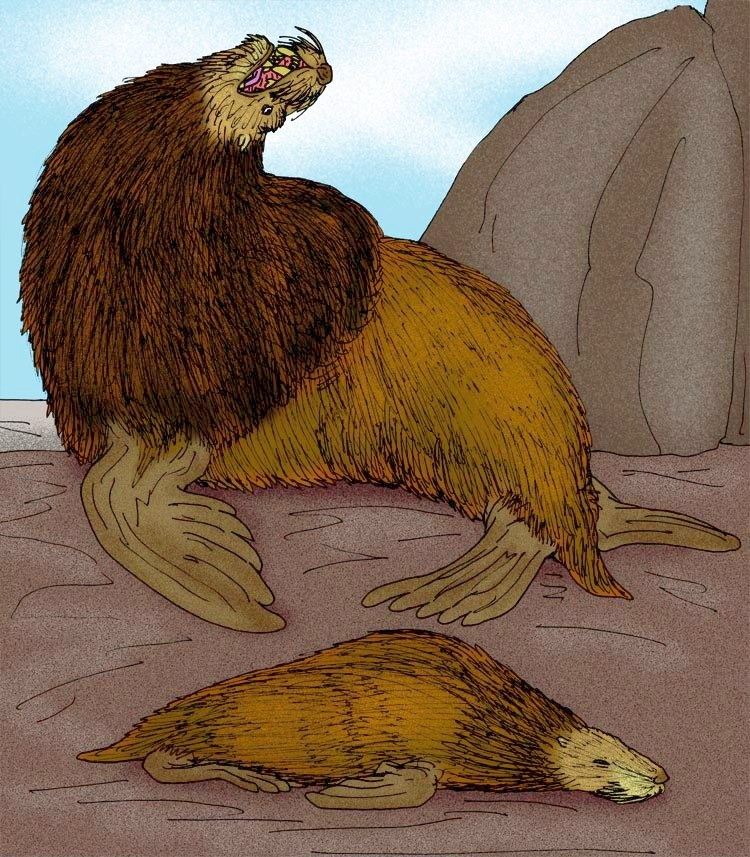
Artist's Reconstruction of Thalassoleon mexicanus

T. mexicanus was comparable in size to the largest modern fur seals, with an old-male skull length of 272 mm and an estimated minimal weight of 295–318 kg (650–700 lb). Holotype of T. macnallyae, UCMP 112809, is a male equal in size to T. mexicanus.
