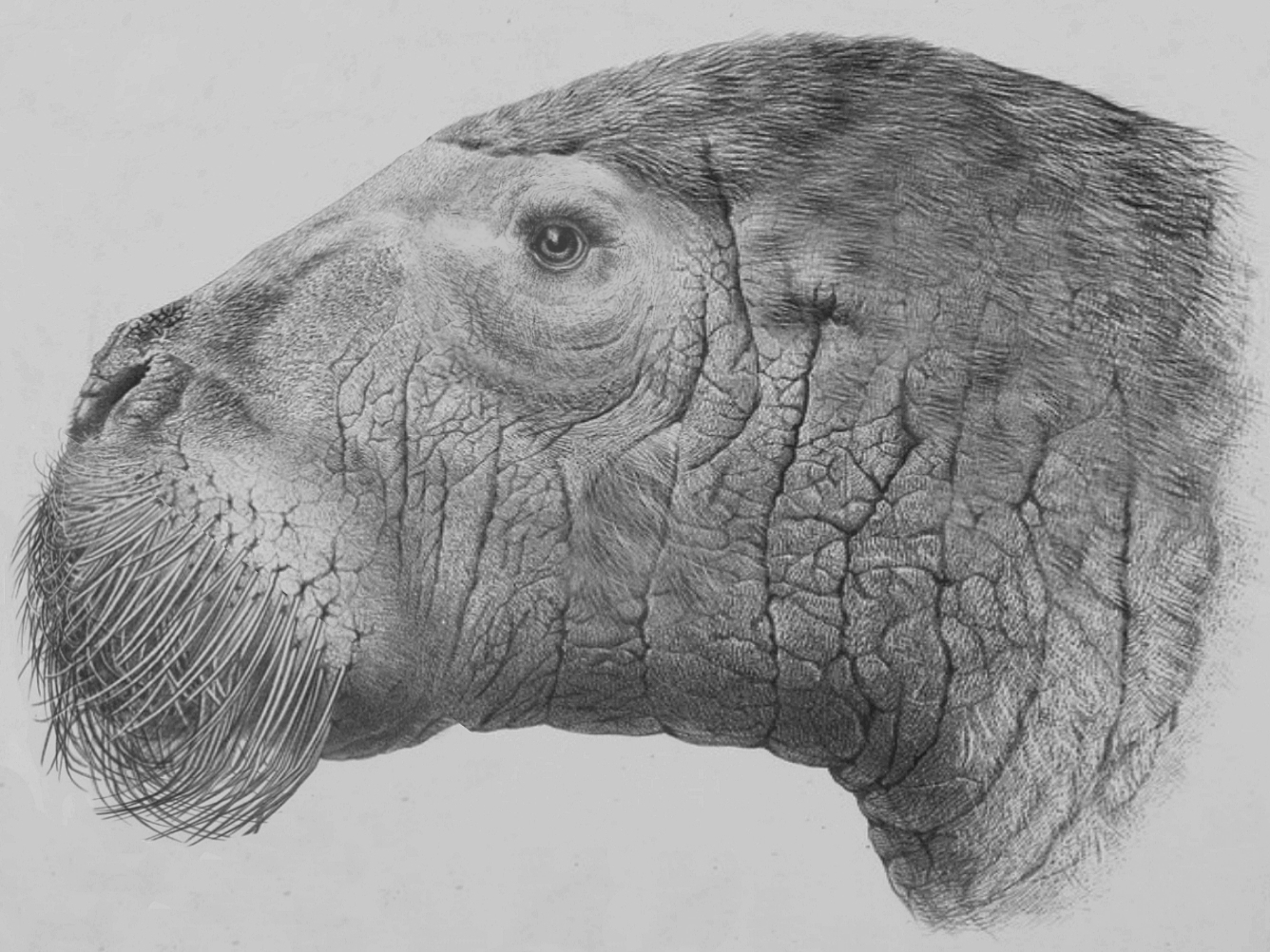

Scientific classification
- Kingdom: Animalia
- Phylum: Chordata
- Class: Mammalia
- Order: Carnivora
- Parvorder: Pinnipedia
- Family: Odobenidae
- Genus: †Aivukus; Repenning & Tedford, 1977

Species
- A. cedrosensis

= Aivukus =

Aivukus Temporal range: Miocene

Genus of mammals

Aivukus is an extinct genus of walrus from the Miocene.

== Etymology ==
The generic name is derived from the Inuit word for walrus, aivuk.

== Description ==
From fossil records it was at least as big as, if not slightly bigger than, the modern walrus, and, like the modern walrus, was probably a molluscivore.

== Sources ==
- Marine Mammals: Evolutionary Biology by Annalisa Berta, James L. Sumich
- Encyclopedia of Marine Mammals by William F. Perrin, Bernd Wursig, and J. G.M. Thewissen
