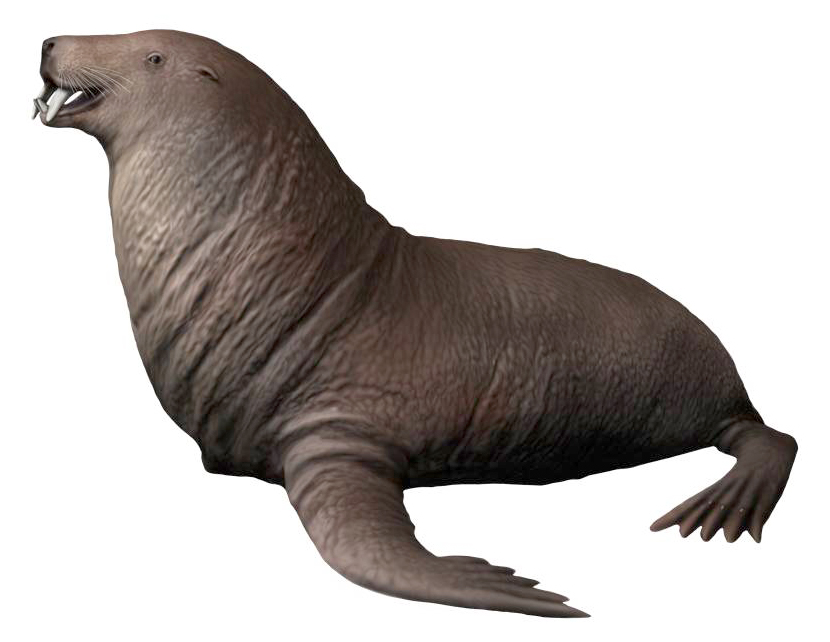
- Restoration of Gomphotaria pugnax

Scientific classification
- Kingdom: Animalia
- Phylum: Chordata
- Class: Mammalia
- Order: Carnivora
- Parvorder: Pinnipedia
- Family: Odobenidae
- Genus: †Gomphotaria; Barnes & Rashke, 1991

Type species
- †Gomphotaria pugnax Barnes & Rashke, 1991

= Gomphotaria =

Gomphotaria Temporal range: Late Miocene, 7.2–5.3 Ma

Extinct genus of carnivores

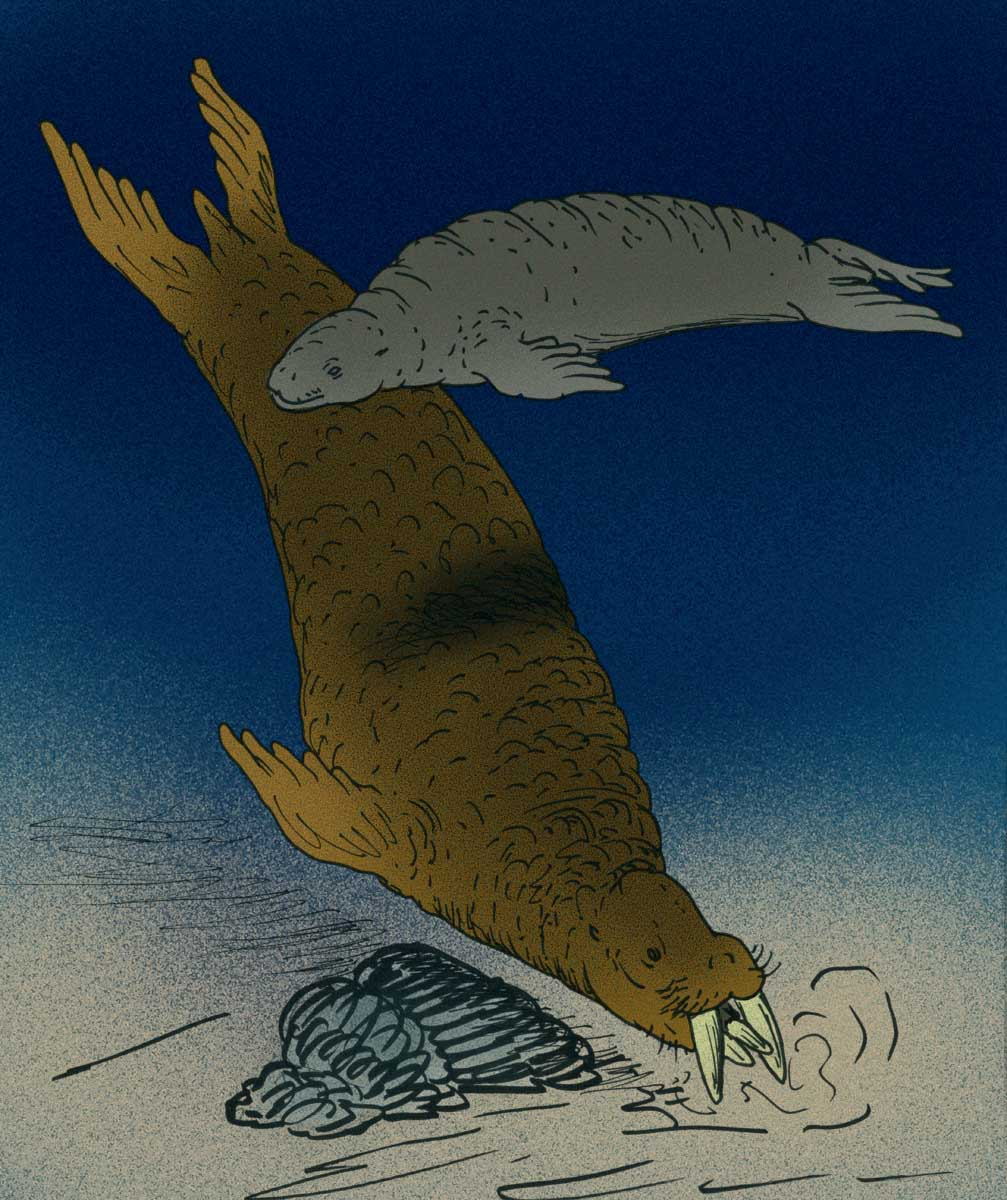
Restoration of foraging Gomphotaria pugnax with Dusignathus in foreground

Gomphotaria is a genus of very large shellfish-eating dusignathine walrus found along the coast of what is now California, during the late Miocene.

== Description ==
It was a huge-sized pinniped with skull length of around 47 cm (19 in), surpassed only by Pontolis, which had a skull of 60 cm (24 in) long. Gomphotaria had comparatively small eyes, increased upper and lower canines and four tusks, with one pair in the lower and upper jaws. According to wear on the tusks, G. pugnax hammered shellfish open, rather than simply sucking them out of their shells as do modern walruses. In terms of the postcranial skeleton, Gomphotaria and other dusignathine walruses were built more like sea lions than modern walrus. Gomphotaria is a prime example of the extreme diversity that walruses once exhibited.
