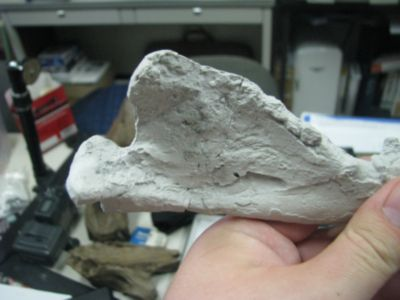

Scientific classification
- Kingdom: Animalia
- Phylum: Chordata
- Class: Mammalia
- Order: Carnivora
- Parvorder: Pinnipedia
- Family: Odobenidae
- Genus: †Kamtschatarctos; Dubrovo, 1981
- Species: †K. sinelnikovae

Binomial name
- †Kamtschatarctos sinelnikovae Dubrovo, 1981

= Kamtschatarctos =

Kamtschatarctos Temporal range: Early Miocene, 15.97–11.608 Ma

Extinct genus of carnivores

Kamtschatarctos is an extinct genus of pinniped that lived approximately 15.97 to 11.608 mya during the Early Miocene in the Kavran-Ukhtolok Bay of Russia's Kamchatka Peninsula. It belonged to the family Odobenidae, the only extant species of which is the walrus.

== Discovery ==
Kamtschatarctos sinelnikovae is known from a partially complete skeleton, discovered in the Etolon Formation in Russia.

== Taxonomy ==
Kamtschatarctos is a relatively basal species of odobenid.
