= Dusignathus =

Dusignathus Temporal range: Miocene to Pliocene, 11.6–3.6 Ma

Scientific classification
- Kingdom: Animalia
- Phylum: Chordata
- Class: Mammalia
- Order: Carnivora
- Parvorder: Pinnipedia
- Family: Odobenidae
- Genus: †Dusignathus; Kellogg, 1927

Type species
- Dusignathus santacruzensis

Species
- D. santacruzensis Kellogg, 1927; D. seftoni Deméré, 1994

Extinct genus of walruses

Dusignathus is an extinct genus of walrus belonging to the family Odobenidae. The genus name means "jaw of the setting sun," a reference to its occurrence on the west coast of North America. Unlike the modern walrus, which bears tusks only on the upper jaw, Dusignathus possessed enlarged canine tusks on both the upper and lower jaws, a trait shared with its close relative Gomphotaria and characteristic of the subfamily Dusignathinae.

== Discovery and naming ==
The genus was first described by Remington Kellogg in 1927, based on fossil material from Santa Cruz California. The holotype of the type species, D. santacruzensis, consists of a fragmentary skull and a well-preserved pair of mandibles collected from a cliff near the wharf. The type locality was later clarified to the Purisima Formation by Mitchell (1962).

A second species, D. seftoni, was named by Thomas Deméré in 1994 from specimens recovered during a paleontological mitigation project in southern California, including an immature skull, a large mandible, and several postcranial elements from the Pliocene San Diego Formation.

== Fossil record ==
Fossils of Dusignathus have been found along the West Coast from California to Isla de Cedros in Mexico. D. santacruzensis is represented by eight collections and D. seftoni by three collections in the Paleobiology Database.
