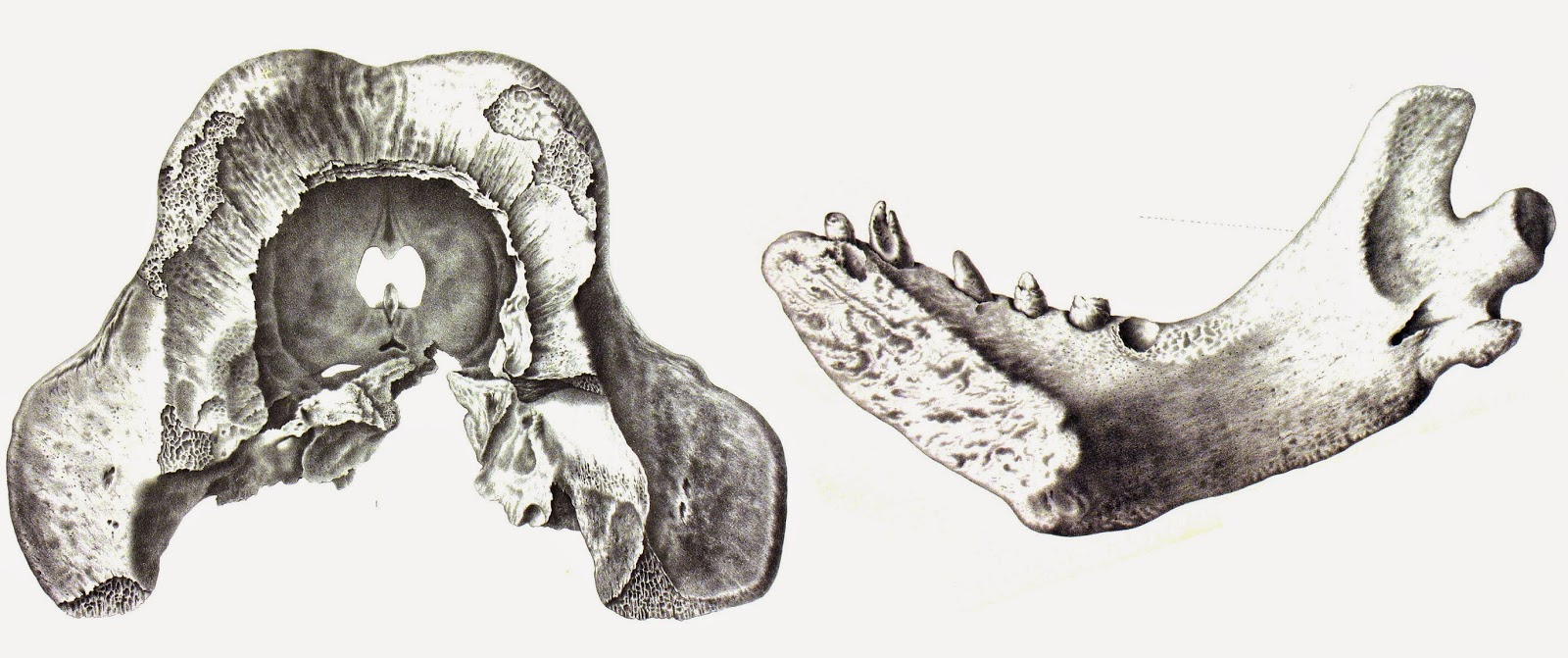
- Specimen of O. emmonsi, the holotype of the synonym Alachtherium cretsii

Scientific classification
- Kingdom: Animalia
- Phylum: Chordata
- Class: Mammalia
- Order: Carnivora
- Parvorder: Pinnipedia
- Family: Odobenidae
- Subfamily: Odobeninae; Leidy, 1859
- Genus: †Ontocetus; Leidy, 1859

Type species
- O. emmonsi

Species
- O. emmonsi Leidy, 1859; O. posti Boisville, Chatar & Kohno, 2024

= Ontocetus =

Ontocetus Temporal range: Miocene to Late Pleistocene, 13.6–0.3 Ma

Extinct genus of carnivorans

Ontocetus is an extinct genus of walrus, an aquatic carnivoran of the family Odobenidae, endemic to coastal regions of the southern North Sea and the southeastern coastal regions of the U.S. during the Miocene-Pleistocene. It lived from 13.6 mya—300,000 years ago, existing for approximately 13.3 million years.

== Taxonomy ==
The type species, Ontocetus emmonsi, was named by Joseph Leidy in 1859 on the basis of a single tusk-like tooth (USNM 329064) collected by Ebenezer Emmons from the early Pliocene (Zanclean) Yorktown Formation of North Carolina.

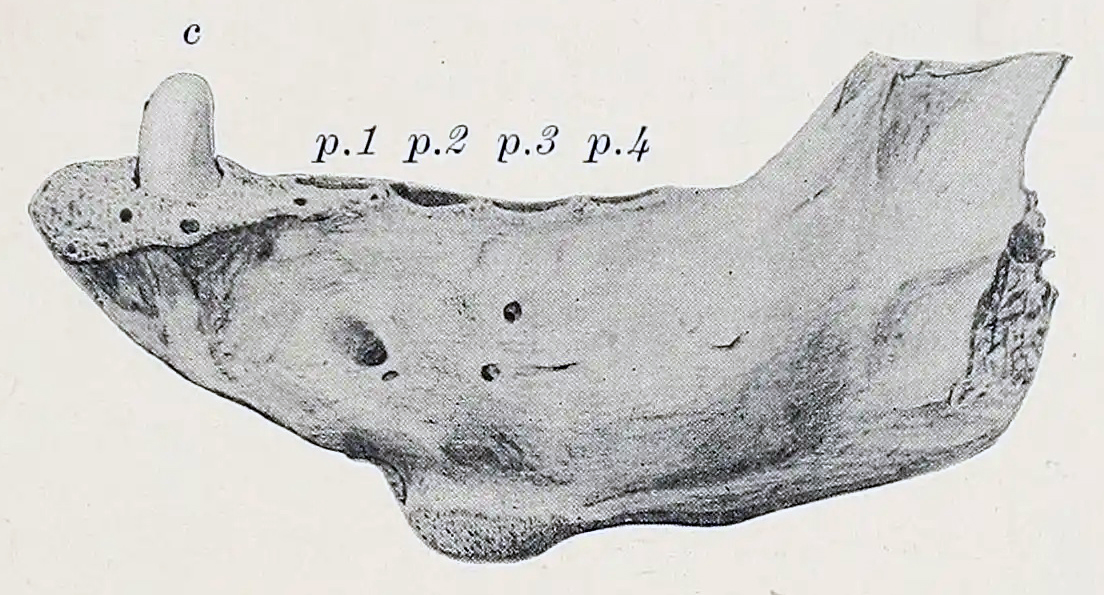
Type lower jaw of Prorosmarus alleni, now a synonym of O. emmonsi

In the meantime, marine mammals fossils were being unearthed in Neogene deposits in the vicinity of Antwerp, Belgium as well as Suffolk, England. One of these fossils was identified as an odobenid and named Alachtherium cretsii. in 1867. An isolated tooth (RBINS 2892) was named Trichechodon koninckii in 1871. The fossils from Suffolk were named Trichechodon huxleyi in 1865. For decades, however, Ontocetus was tossed aside as a physeterid, as the type specimen was believed to have been missing. For example, Ontocetus was at one time considered a synonym of the physeterid Hoplocetus. In the meantime, further Pliocene walrus fossils were collected from the North Atlantic, including the holotypes of Alachitherium antverpiensis, Alachitherium antwerpiensis, Prorosmarus alleni, and Alachitherium africanum.

In 2008, all specimens of Pliocene odobenids from the North Atlantic region were reviewed following the rediscovery of the Ontocetus emmonsi holotype in the 1990s. T. huxleyi, A. cretsii, A. antwerpiensis, A. antverpiensis, A. africanum, and P. alleni were declared junior synonyms of O. emmonsi based on comparisons with USNM 329064. T. koninckii, however, was found to be undiagnostic and designated a nomen dubium.

In 2024, reassessment of a pair of mandibles from the UK and a mandible from Belgium that had been assigned to O. emmonsi resulted in the establishment of a second species in the genus, O. posti.

=== Misassigned species ===
O. oxymycterus was named by Remington Kellogg in 1925 on the basis of USNM 10923, collected from the middle Miocene (Serravallian) Monterey Formation in Santa Barbara, California. It was recombined as Scaldicetus oxymycterus by Kohno and Ray (2008), since O. emmonsi was odobenid and O. oxymycterus was physeteroid. Boersma and Pyenson (2015) made it the type species of the genus Albicetus.
