= Imagotaria =

Imagotaria Temporal range: Late Miocene

Scientific classification
- Kingdom: Animalia
- Phylum: Chordata
- Class: Mammalia
- Order: Carnivora
- Parvorder: Pinnipedia
- Family: Odobenidae
- Genus: †Imagotaria
- Species: †I. downsi

Binomial name
- †Imagotaria downsi Mitchell, 1968

Extinct genus of carnivores

Imagotaria is an extinct monotypic genus of walrus with the sole species Imagotaria downsi. Fossils of Imagotaria are known from the early late Miocene of California (c. 10-12 million years ago).

== Description ==
The 1.8 metres (6 ft) long pinniped more closely resembled in its overall shape a sea lion rather than a walrus. Unlike the extant walrus (Odobenus rosmarus), Imagotaria did not possess elongate, ever-growing tusks, but instead bore enlarged canines (with respect to other pinnipeds).

Imagotaria is an example of a primitive walrus that does not grossly appear similar to a modern walrus. However, the walrus family (the Odobenidae) is a more inclusive group, that includes walruses without tusks (e.g. Imagotaria), walruses with upper and lower tusks (the subfamily Dusignathinae), and walruses with upper tusks like the extant walrus (subfamily Odobeninae, tribe Odobenini). It is possible to classify these pinnipeds as walruses because they share many other skull features (besides tusks) as well as many skeletal features, all of which indicate common ancestry.

== Palaeobiology ==
The teeth of Imagotaria indicate that its feeding ecology was markedly different from that of modern walrus, and more similar to that of less specialized pinnipeds like seals, fur seals, and sea lions. Conical, unworn teeth and the lack of a vaulted palate indicate that Imagotaria did not feed on molluscs like modern walrus. Modern walruses do not use their teeth to chew molluscs like sea otters do. Instead, they hold a clam in their lips, and the vaulted palate allows them to use their tongue as a powerful piston to suck the soft parts right out of the clam shell. The shell is then dropped to the seafloor, never entering the oral cavity.

Additionally, fossils of Imagotaria (and the earlier Neotherium, c. 15 million years ago) demonstrate that early walruses had, by the middle and late Miocene, already developed extreme sexual dimorphism (males and females having different body sizes). It is unclear whether extreme sexual dimorphism is ancestral to all pinnipeds, or if it has been independently acquired in multiple pinniped lineages.
