= Neotherium =

Neotherium Temporal range: Middle Miocene

Scientific classification
- Kingdom: Animalia
- Phylum: Chordata
- Class: Mammalia
- Order: Carnivora
- Parvorder: Pinnipedia
- Family: Odobenidae
- Genus: †Neotherium; Kellogg, 1931
- Species: †N. mirum

Binomial name
- †Neotherium mirum Kellogg, 1931

Species of walrus (fossil)

Neotherium mirum is an extinct species of basal walrus. It was smaller than living forms and it did not have long tusks. Males were larger than females.

== Palaeoecology ==
Stable isotope evidence indicates that in the eastern North Pacific, Neotherium had intermediate foraging habits between the nearshore specialist Pithanotaria and the offshore specialist Allodesmus.
