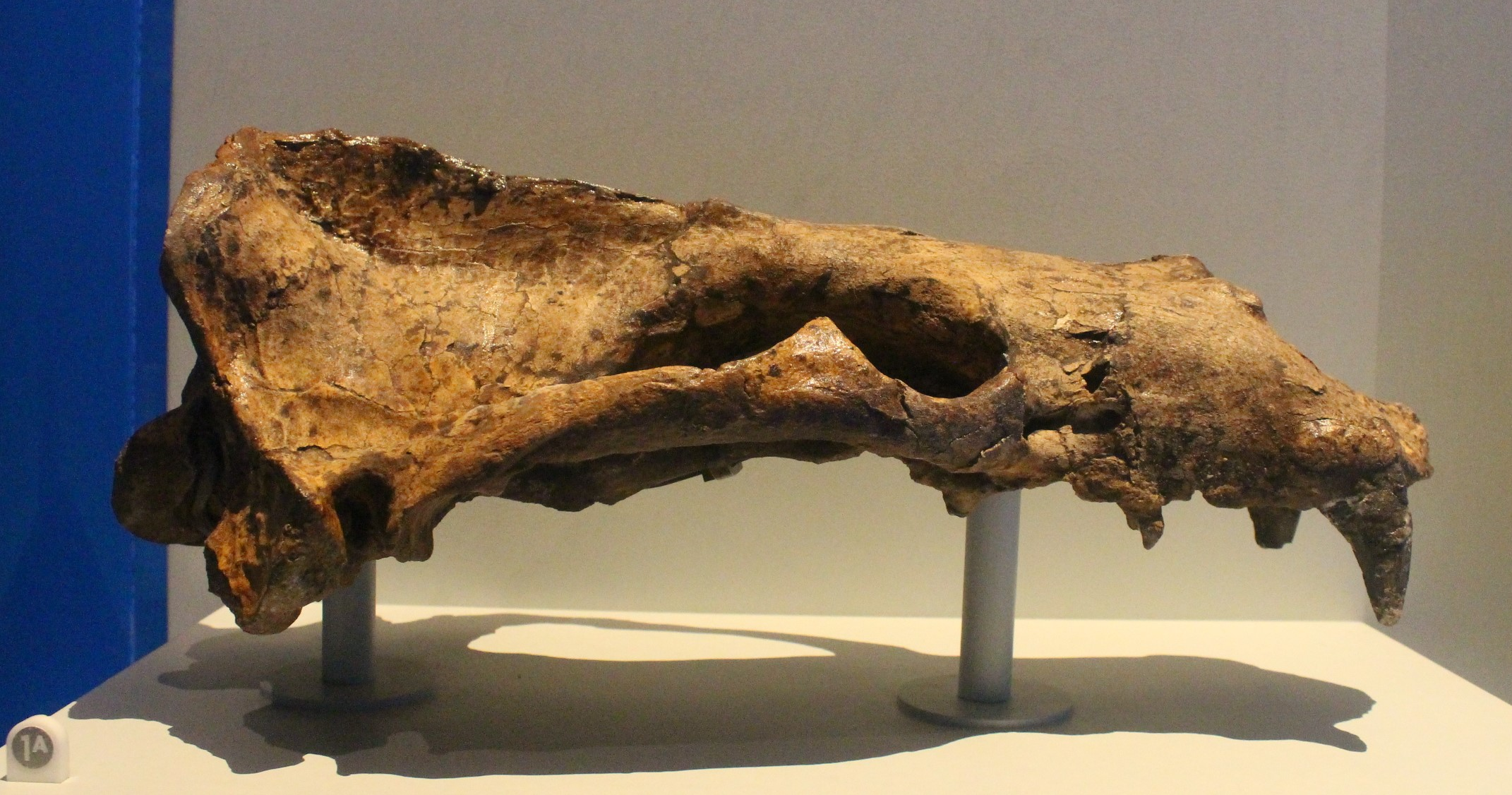
- Skull (LACM 162551) of P. barroni, Natural History Museum of Los Angeles County

Scientific classification
- Kingdom: Animalia
- Phylum: Chordata
- Class: Mammalia
- Order: Carnivora
- Parvorder: Pinnipedia
- Family: Odobenidae
- Genus: †Pontolis; True, 1905

Type species
- †Pontolis magnus True, 1905

Species
- †P. magnus (True, 1905, type]; †P. barroni Biewer, Velez-Juarbe & Parham, 2020; †P. kohnoi Biewer, Velez-Juarbe & Parham, 2020

Synonyms
- Pontoleon magnus True, 1905

= Pontolis =

Pontolis Temporal range: Miocene-Pliocene

Extinct genus of carnivores

Pontolis is an extinct genus of large walrus. It contained three species, P. magnus, P. barroni, and P. kohnoi. Like all pinnipeds, Pontolis was a heavily built amphibious carnivore. Pontolis lived along the Pacific coast of North America along what is now the western coasts of California and Oregon between 11.608 and 5.332 million years ago, during the Miocene and Pliocene.

== Description ==
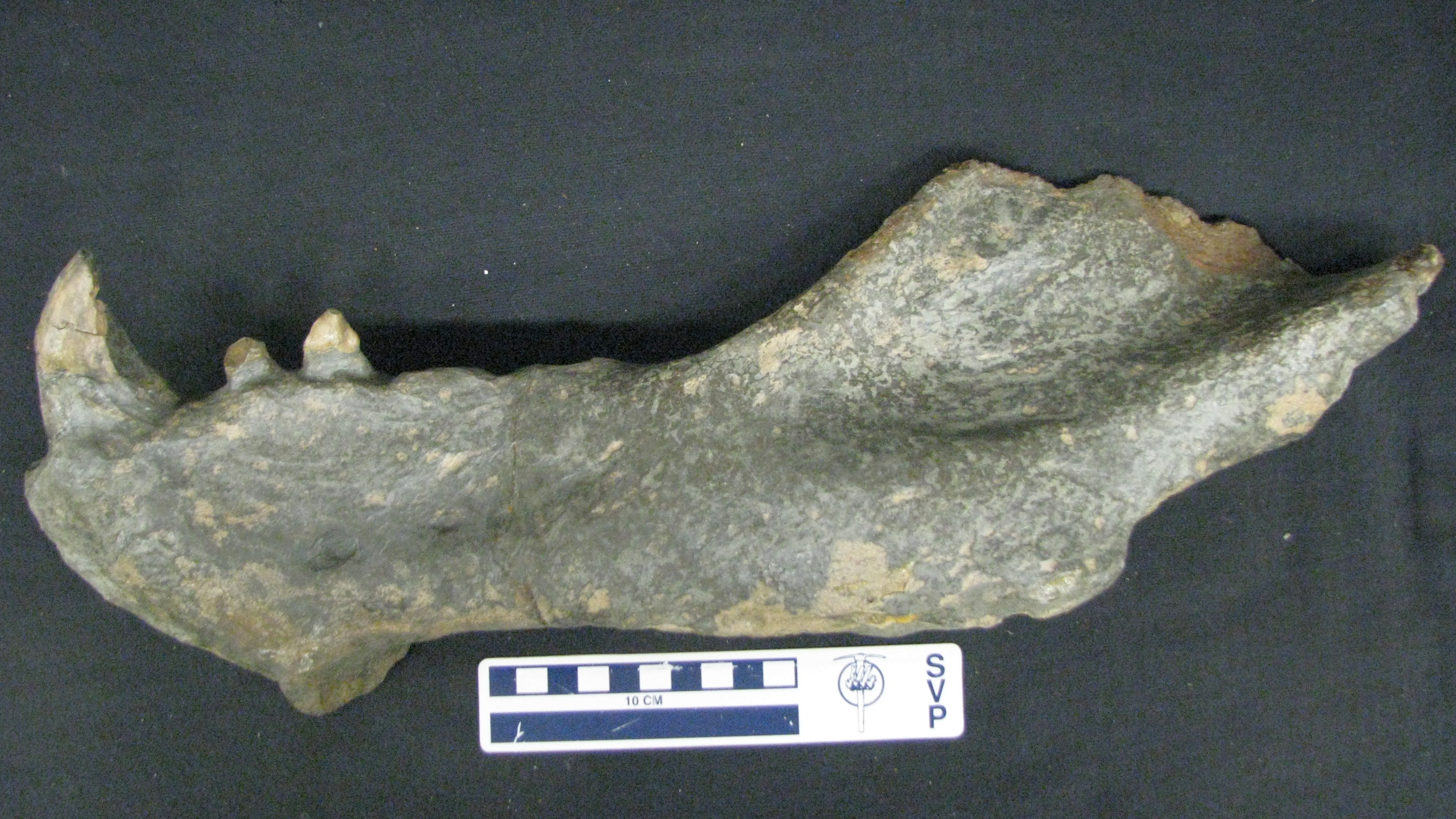
Jaw of P. magnus

The skull of Pontolis is 60 cm (24 in) long, surpassing skulls of any other prehistoric pinnipeds and twice as big as the skulls of modern male walruses. This giant species was much larger than modern walrus, though like many other extinct walrus species, its upper canines did not develop into long tusks like those of the modern walrus. Pontolis reached more than 4 m (13 ft) in body length, rivaling the extant southern elephant seal as the largest pinniped and member of the order Carnivora of all time. Weight estimates for Pontolis range between 2,000 to 4,000 kg (4,400 to 8,800 lb).
