= Astoria Formation =

Geologic formation in Oregon and Washington, United States

- Stratigraphic range: Miocene
- Type: Geological formation
- Sub-units: From top to bottom: Big Creek sandstone member; Newport sandstone member; Silver Point mudstone member; Angora Peak sandstone member
- Underlies: Montesano Formation
- Overlies: Lincoln Creek Formation

Location
- Region: Washington, Oregon
- Country: United States

The Astoria Formation (formerly known as the Astoria shales) is a geologic formation in Washington state & Oregon. It preserves fossils dating back to the early to middle Miocene (but was formerly thought to date to the Oligocene).

== Description ==
The Astoria Formation is a thick marine formation representing a near shore, relatively shallow-water shelf deposit. The formation spans a considerable amount of time, with its base considered to be lower boundary of Newportian Stage (late Early Miocene) & its top to be upper boundary of Newportian Stage (middle Middle Miocene).

== Fossil content ==
| Color key: Taxon / Reclassified taxon / Taxon falsely reported as present / Dubious taxon or junior synonym / Ichnotaxon / Ootaxon / Morphotaxon | Notes; Uncertain or tentative taxa are in small text; ~~crossed out~~ taxa are discredited. |

=== Mammals ===
==== Carnivorans ====
| Genus | Species | Stratigraphy | Material | Notes | Images |
|---|---|---|---|---|---|
| Desmatophoca | D. brachycephala | East of Knappton, Washington. | Skull elements. | A desmatophocid. | |
| Desmatophoca | D. oregonensis | Iron Mountain Bed & an unspecified horizon. | Multiple specimens. | A desmatophocid. | |
| Enaliarctos | E. emlongi | South of Big Creek, Lincoln County, Oregon. | USNM 250345. | A pinnipedimorph, may instead be from the Nye Mudstone. | |
| Enaliarctos | E. sp. | Iron Mountain bed, Lincoln County, Oregon. | Partial skeleton (UWBM 89114). | A pinnipedimorph. | |
| Eodesmus | E. condoni | Iron Mountain Bed, Oregon. | A nearly complete cranium. | A desmatophocid. | |
| Pacificotaria | P. hadromma | Iron Mountain bed, Lincoln County, Oregon. | Complete cranium (LACM 127973). | A pinnipedimorph. | |
| Proneotherium | P. repenningi | Lincoln County, Oregon. | Remains of multiple individuals. | An odobenid. | |
| Pteronarctos | P. goedertae | Lincoln County, Oregon. | Skulls. | A pinnipedimorph. | |

==== Cetaceans ====
| Genus | Species | Presence | Material | Notes | Images |
|---|---|---|---|---|---|
| Cophocetus | C. oregonensis | North of Yaquina Bay. | Associated skull, jaws & skeletal elements. | A baleen whale. | |
| Dilophodelphis | D. fordycei | Nye Beach, Oregon. | USNM 214911. | A platanistid. | |
| Wimahl | W. chinookensis | Washington State | | A kentriodontid. | |
| Zarhinocetus | Z. donnamatsonae | Near Elma, Washington. | UCMP 86139. | An allodelphinid. | |

==== Perissodactyls ====
| Genus | Species | Presence | Material | Notes | Images |
|---|---|---|---|---|---|
| Aphelops | A. sp. | | Fragment of skull (USNM 187123). | A rhinoceros. | |
| Tylocephalonyx | T. sp. | Iron Mountain Bed, Lincoln County, Oregon. | A skull (NMNH 187129). | A chalicothere. | |

=== Birds ===
| Genus | Species | Presence | Material | Notes | Images |
|---|---|---|---|---|---|
| Diomedeidae | Gen. et. sp. indet. | East of Knappton, Washington. | Partial skeleton (SMF Av 644). | An albatross. | |

=== Cartilaginous fish ===
| Genus | Species | Presence | Material | Notes | Images |
|---|---|---|---|---|---|
| Carcharodon | C. megalodon | North of Newport, Oregon. | | Species reassigned to the genus Otodus. | |
| Cetorhinus | C. piersoni | North of Newport, Oregon. | Teeth. | A basking shark. | |
| Cosmopolitodus | C. hastalis | Coos Bay, Oregon. | A tooth. | A lamnid shark. | |
| Cosmopolitodus | C. planus? | North of Newport, Oregon. | | A lamnid shark. | |
| Galeocerdo | G. cf. aduncus | North of Newport, Oregon. | | A requiem shark. | |
| Hexanchus | | North of Newport, Oregon. | | A cow shark. | |
| Isurus | I. hastalis | Coos Bay, Oregon. | A tooth. | Species reassigned to Cosmopolitodus. | |
| Isurus | I. planus? | North of Newport, Oregon. | | Species reassigned to Cosmopolitodus. | |
| Myliobatis | | North of Newport, Oregon. | | An eagle ray. | |
| Otodus | O. megalodon | North of Newport, Oregon. | | Originally reported as Carcharodon megalodon. | |

== See also ==
- List of fossiliferous stratigraphic units in Oregon
- Paleontology in Washington (state)
- List of fossiliferous stratigraphic units in Washington
- Paleontology in Oregon
