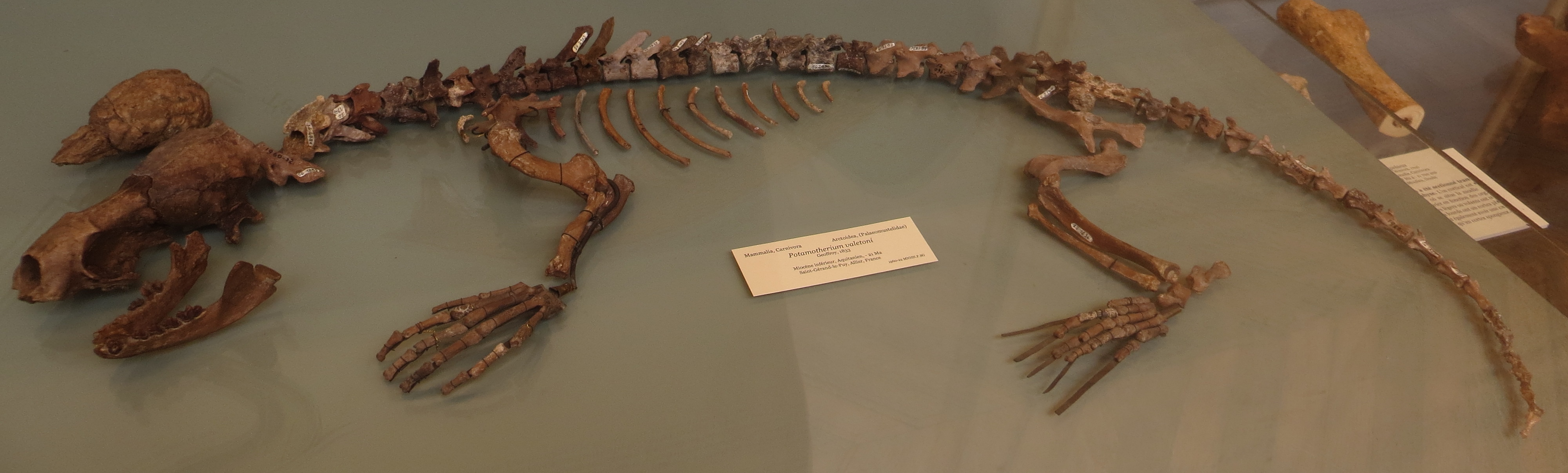
- P. valletoni skeleton at the Gallery of Paleontology and Comparative Anatomy.

Scientific classification
- Kingdom: Animalia
- Phylum: Chordata
- Class: Mammalia
- Infraclass: Placentalia
- Order: Carnivora
- Family: †Semantoridae
- Genus: †Potamotherium; Geoffroy, 1833

Species
- P. valletoni (Geoffroy, 1833) (type); P. miocenicum (Peters, 1868)

= Potamotherium =

Potamotherium Temporal range: 23.03–11.1 Ma Aquitanian - Tortonian

Extinct genus of mammals

Potamotherium ('river beast') an extinct genus of caniform carnivoran from the Miocene epoch of France and Germany. It has historically been assigned to the family Mustelidae (otters, weasels, etc.), but more recent studies suggest that it represents a primitive relative of pinnipeds (seals, sea lions, etc.)

== Classification ==
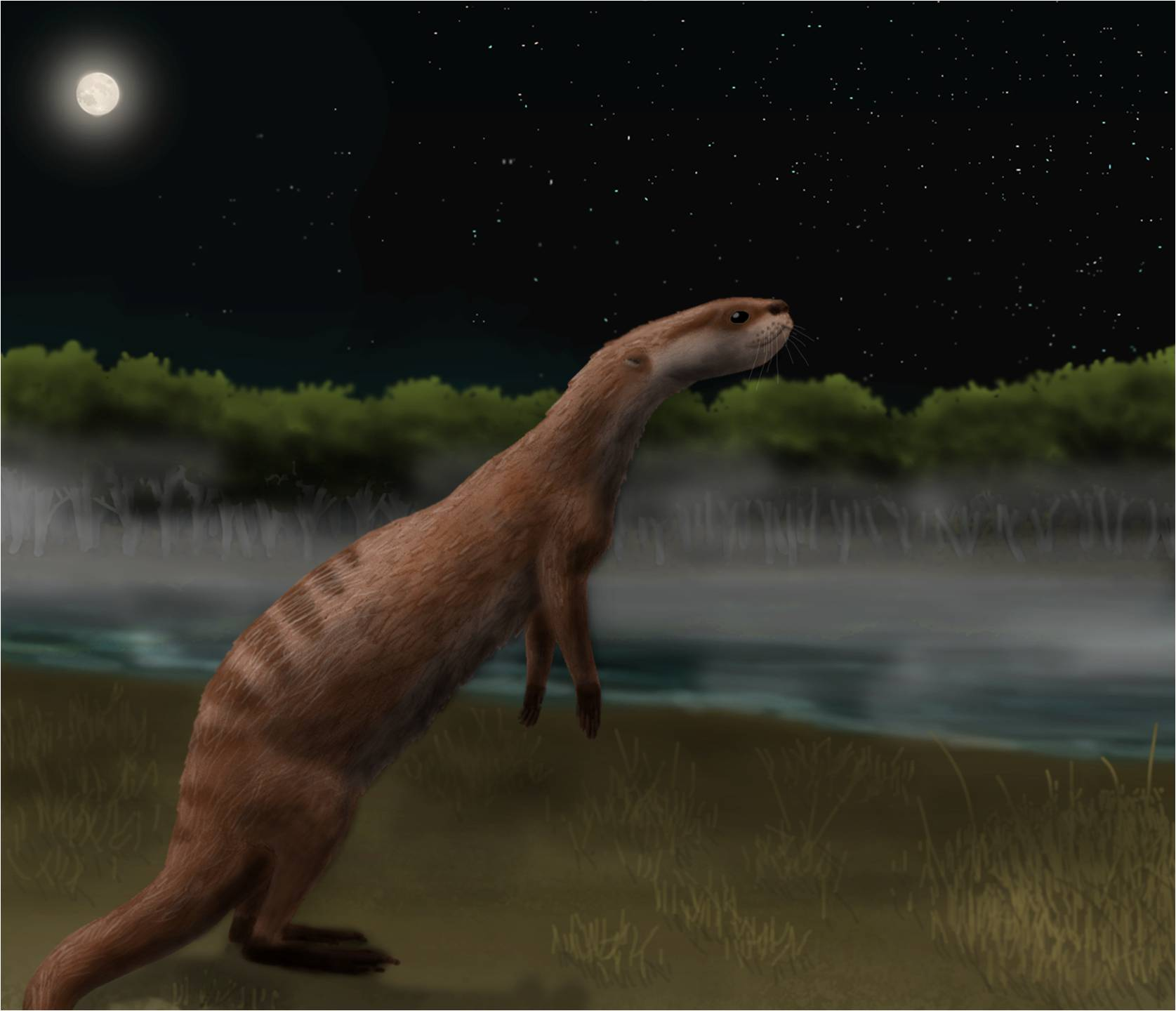
Restoration of P. miocenicum

The genus was first described in 1833. Carroll (1988) assigned it to the family Mustelidae as a member of the subfamily Oligobuninae. However, it was recently suggested that Potamotherium was not a mustelid at all, but rather a very basal pinniped. Berta et al. (2018) placed Potamotherium along with Puijila and Semantor in the family Semantoridae.

Two species have been identified in the genus: P. valletoni, the type species, and P. miocenicum.

== Distribution ==
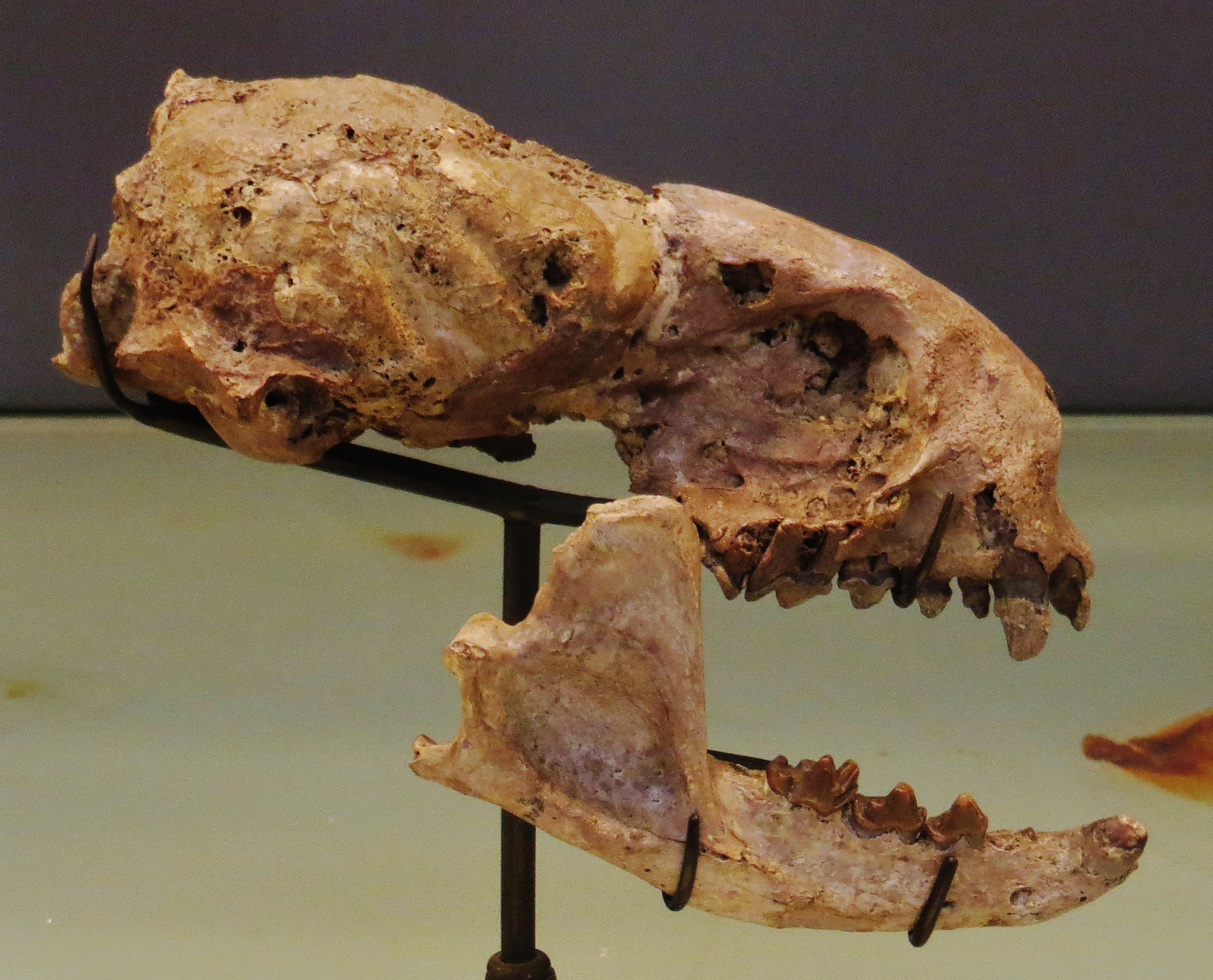
Skull P. valletoni

Finds range from the mid-latitudes of Europe and North America, dated from the Oligocene/Miocene boundary and surviving through to the end of the Miocene. It has been interpreted by several researchers as a basal, non-marine ancestor of seals and sea lions, suggesting a freshwater phase in the evolutionary transition of pinnipeds from land to sea; geochemical analysis supports this hypothesis, finding P. valletoni to have been a freshwater dweller. If Potamotherium was indeed a pinniped instead of a mustelid, its relatives were possibly early bears (whose ancestors at the time were small and generally weasel-like).

== Palaeobiology ==
Physically, Potamotherium resembled a modern otter, and was 1.5 metres (5 ft) long, with an elongated, slender body and short legs. With a flexible backbone and a streamlined shape, it was probably a good swimmer. Analysis of fossils suggests that Potamotherium had a poor sense of smell, but made up for this with good vision and hearing.

Fossils of Potamotherium are so complete that the shape of the brain can be inferred via a digital endocast of the skull. The coronal gyrus (a fold on the lateral surface of the brain) is broad, slanted backwards and partially split by a small groove. The brain is nearly identical to that of Enaliarctos, an extinct mammal universally agreed to be close to pinnipeds. Modern pinnipeds and the extinct Pinnarctidion have an expanded coronal gyrus with a distinctive vertical orientation. The carnivorans with the largest coronal gyrus are freshwater foragers such as the otter civet (Cynogale bennetti) and certain otter species (in the genera Lutra and Lontra). They primarily emphasize sensitive whiskers (vibrissae) or the lips while hunting, rather than the hands. It is likely that the same was true for Potamotherium. Modern pinnipeds are unique among marine mammals for their large whiskers, which were probably inherited from an ancestor similar to Potamotherium.
