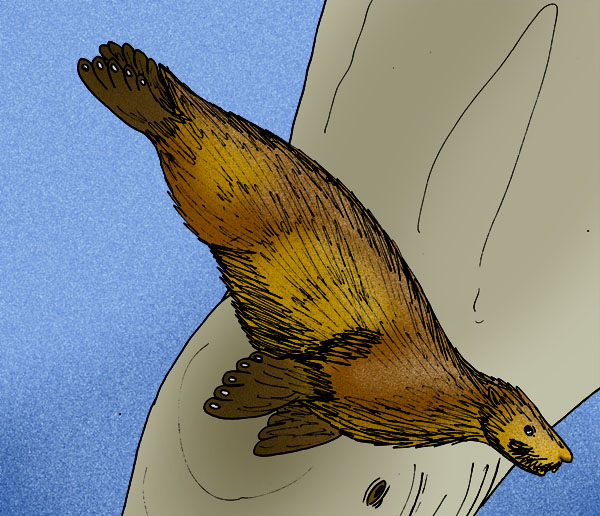
- Artist reconstruction of Enaliarctos emlongi

Scientific classification
- Kingdom: Animalia
- Phylum: Chordata
- Class: Mammalia
- Order: Carnivora
- Clade: Pan-Pinnipedia
- Clade: Pinnipedimorpha; Berta et al., 1989

Subtaxa
- †Enaliarctidae Mitchell & Tedford, 1973; Pinnipediformes Berta, 1994; †Pinnarctidion Barnes, 1979; †Pacificotaria Barnes, 1992; †Pteronarctos Barnes, 1989; Pinnipedia Illiger, 1811

= Pinnipedimorpha =

Pinnipedimorphs Temporal range: Oligocene–Holocene, 24–0 Ma

Stem-clade of arctoid carnivorans

Pinnipedimorpha is a clade of arctoid carnivorans that is defined to include the last common ancestor of Phoca and Enaliarctos, and all descendants of that ancestor. Scientists still debate on which lineage of arctoid carnivorans are the closest relatives to the pinnipedimorphs, being more closely related to musteloids.

Below is an overall phylogeny of the taxa covered in the article followed after a composite tree in Berta et al. (2018) and a total-evidence (combined molecular-morphological) dataset in Paterson et al. (2020):

- - - †Amphicynodontidae
    - - †Semantoridae
      - - Pinnipedimorpha
          - †Enaliarctidae
          - - Pinnipediformes
              - †Pinnarctidion
              - - - †Pacificotaria
                  - †Pteronarctos
                - Pinnipedia
                  - Phocoidea
                    - Phocidae
                  - Otarioidea
                    - †Desmatophocidae
                    - - - Odobenidae
                        - - Panotariidae
                            - †Eotaria
                            - Otariidae

== See also ==
- List of fossil pinnipeds
