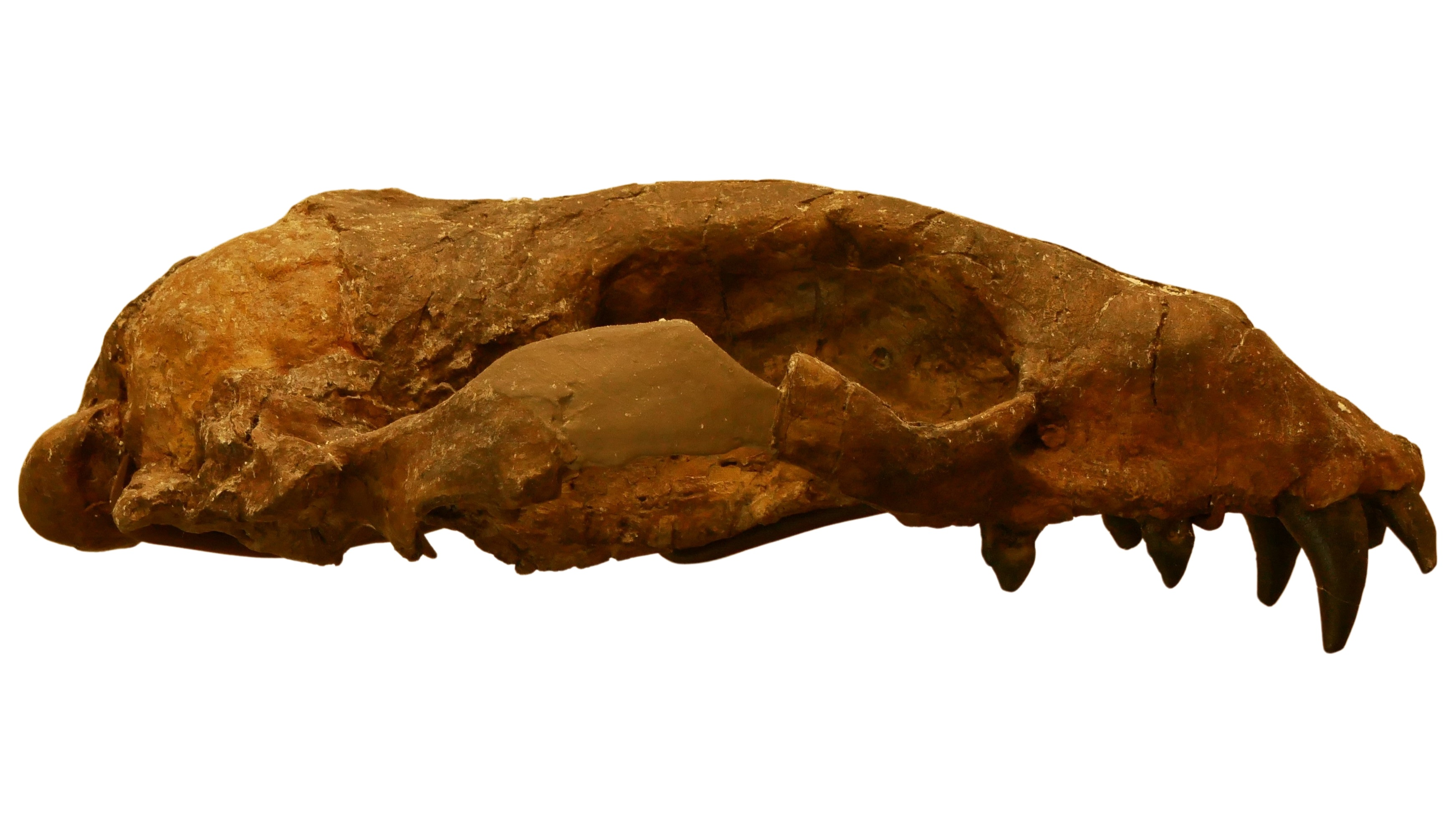
- Desmatophoca oregonensis

Scientific classification
- Domain: Eukaryota
- Kingdom: Animalia
- Phylum: Chordata
- Class: Mammalia
- Order: Carnivora
- Clade: Pinnipedia
- Family: †Desmatophocidae
- Genus: †Desmatophoca; Condon, 1906

Species
- D. brachycephala Barnes, 1987; D. oregonensis Condon, 1906 (type species)

= Desmatophoca =

Desmatophoca Temporal range: Early Miocene–Middle Miocene

Extinct genus of carnivores

Desmatophoca is an extinct genus of early pinniped that lived during the Miocene, and is named from the Greek "phoca", meaning seal. A taxon of the family Desmatophocidae, it shares some morphological similarities with modern true seals. Two species are recognized: Desmatophoca oregonensis and Desmatophoca brachycephala. Little information exists regarding Desmatophoca, due to the small number of fossil samples obtained and identified.

Unlike modern pinnipeds, Desmatophoca did not survive into the Holocene. There is some scientific debate as to whether any Desmatophoca species may have been present in the Oligocene, but without fossil samples obtained from this era, this is based primarily on conjecture. All samples of fossil Desmatophoca were found in marine deposits in Washington and Oregon, in the USA, which could indicate a geographic range of what is now the Pacific Northwest.

== Description ==
Despite sharing morphological similarities with extant true seals, Desmatophoca differ in unique and important ways. They had significantly shorter tails, and were likely much shorter overall than modern seals. Despite their small size compared with the seals of today, they had heavier, and likely more powerful jaws. Because of this, it is likely they had a stronger bite force than any seal alive today, making them formidable hunters of their time. Like modern seals, they were carnivorous, and their large orbits indicate a sight-based hunting strategy.

=== Skull and dentition ===
Desmatophoca skulls are characterized with large orbits, indicating the carnivorous pinnipeds were likely hunters reliant on sight. Through comparisons with extant pinnipeds, Desmatophoca were determined to be either grip and tear feeders (biting prey and shaking it into smaller portions to consume) or pierce feeders (biting prey and using slight suction to draw it fully into the mouth).

Desmatophoca mandibles are thick, and they possess wide coronoid processes; both of which provide jaw strength associated with grip and tear feeders. The thickness of the mandible is especially important, as it provides both high bite force and increased surface area for muscular attachment between the jaws, which allows for stronger mastication. The extremely thick mandibles also serve as a diagnostic characteristic of this genus. Despite this evidence that indicates they may have been grip and tear feeders, Desmatophoca possess long tooth rows, which is characteristic of pierce feeders. But, they likely lacked the diagnostic small mastication muscles that would be present on a true pierce feeder. Because they have traits that would lend themselves to either strategy, it is still heavily debated which feeding strategy Desmatophoca utilized. Many agree it is likely the seals used some combination of pierce and rip and tear feeding, or potentially a new strategy not yet observed that served as a middle ground between the two.

Desmatophoca have morphologically similar skulls to other predators of fish and squid, indicating this was the prominent makeup of their diet. However, it has been proposed that D. oregonensis were actually filter feeders, though their lack of diagnostic features (such as complex tooth cuspation and simple dentition). Further comparisons between Desmatophoca teeth with extant seals indicates they were a generalist species.

A distinct diagnostic characteristic of Desmatophoca skulls is the unusually large and widely-spaced paraoccipital process, something not seen in modern carnivores. They also have a rudimentary postorbital process compared with extant seals and other Desmatophocidae.

== Classification ==
Desmatophoca is the genus within the larger clade Desmatophocidae, which also contains the genus Allodesmus. Allodesmus and Desmatophoca are both monophyletic, and are closely related sister groups. The two genera both have large preoccipital processes, similar cranium shapes, and short rostrums. Desmatophoca is thought to be the more primitive of the two, lacking the two-rooted postcanine teeth and prenarial shelf of Allodesmus. Desmatophocidae have a close sister taxon as well, Phocidae, and both are found within the broad monophyly of Phocoidea. All members of Phocoidea, including Desmatophoca, share large orbits, bulbous cheektooth crowns, and expanded contact between the squamosal and the jugal.

- Odobenidae
- - Phocoidea
  - - Desmatophoca
    - Allodesmus

The genus Desmatophoca consists of two known species: D. oregonensis (named for Oregon, the state it was discovered in) and D. brachycephala.

== Discovery ==
The first Desmatophoca discovered was D. oregonensis, by Professor Thomas Condon in 1906, a year before his death.

It was found in the middle Miocene layer of the Astoria Formation in Newport, Oregon. It was described and classified based solely off of a skull and partial jaw, and at the time, it helped shed light on the relationship between modern pinnipeds and other terrestrial carnivores. The use of D. oregonensis helped solidify the theory that modern seals evolved from terrestrial carnivores, and not the other way around. By comparing morphologies of D. oregonensis with extant terrestrial carnivores, it was determined that Desmatophoca shares a most recent common ancestor with bears and mustelids. This fossil sample also helped throw out the theory that seals share their most recent common ancestor with dogs and other canines, which was a popular thought at the time.

The second species of Desmatophoca, D. brachycephala was discovered in 1987 by Barnes, in the late Miocene layer of the Astoria Formation that jetted into southwest Washington state.

=== Limitations ===
Because fossil Desmatophoca have only appeared from the same site, the Astoria Foundation in the Pacific Northwest, there is a bias in the data that has been collected. Additionally, few fossil Desmatophoca have been found and successfully categorized, meaning there is still much to be discovered about this species. In fact, of 388 instances of fossil pinniped species being identified successfully, only 5% of these samples belong to Desmatophocidae, comprising 11 species.
