= Natalia Rybczynski =

Canadian paleobiologist

- Citizenship: Canadian
- Education: Duke University
- Scientific career
- Fields: paleontology
- Workplaces: Canadian Museum of Nature

Natalia Rybczynski is a Canadian paleobiologist, professor and researcher.

She is a research scientist with the Canadian Museum of Nature and holds a professorship at Carleton University in Ottawa, Ontario. Her doctorate was obtained at Duke University and her main interests are evolutionary functional morphology, particularly at the polar climes.

Rybczynski is notable for having discovered a previously unknown carnivorous arctic mammal, a proto-seal, which represents a "missing link" between land-dwelling mammals and modern day ocean-going seals. Puijila darwini was discovered in 2007 on Devon Island in the Canadian arctic. Discovery of this specimen was announced in the journal Nature in April 2009. She has also contributed to the understanding of the biomechanics of Suminia, a primitive mammal thought to exhibit early evidence of teeth and jaw structure specialized for chewing. Her discovery of a fossil tibia of a High Arctic camel was featured in a November 2015 TED talk given by Radiolab producer Latif Nasser.

Rybczynski is also known for her work comparing the teeth and wood chips of modern beavers with the fossilized teeth and fossilized wood chips of a relative of the modern beaver Dipoides. Most members of the genus Castor weren't aquatic, and didn't dine on wood, but Rybczynski concluded Dipoides was aquatic, dined on wood like modern beavers, and built dams like modern beavers. She concluded Dipoides and modern beavers shared a common ancestor approximately 24 million years ago.

A November 2025 episode of the CBC TV program The Nature of Things documents the life-altering aftermath of a concussion Rybczynski suffered during a 2011 skiing accident in the Gatineau Hills near Ottawa.

She is the niece of writer and architect Witold Rybczynski.

== Selected publications ==
- Fraser, Danielle, et al. "Mean Annual Precipitation Explains Spatiotemporal Patterns of Cenozoic Mammal Beta Diversity and Latitudinal Diversity Gradients in North America." PLoS ONE 9.9 (2014): e106499.
- Eberle, Jaelyn J., Natalia Rybczynski, and David R. Greenwood. "Early Eocene mammals from the Driftwood Creek beds, Driftwood Canyon Provincial Park, northern British Columbia." Journal of Vertebrate Paleontology 34.4 (2014): 739-746.
- Fraser, Danielle, and Natalia Rybczynski. "Complexity of ruminant masticatory evolution." Journal of morphology (2014).
- Rybczynski, N., Gosse, J. C., Harington, C. R., Wogelius, R. A., Hidy, A. J., and Buckley, M. (2013). "Mid-Pliocene warm-period deposits in the High Arctic yield insight into camel evolution". Nature Communications 4 (1550): 1550.
- Rybczynski, Natalia, Mary R. Dawson, and Richard H. Tedford. "A semi-aquatic Arctic mammalian carnivore from the Miocene epoch and origin of Pinnipedia." Nature 458.7241 (2009): 1021-1024.
- Rybczynski, Natalia, and Robert R. Reisz. "Earliest evidence for efficient oral processing in a terrestrial herbivore." Nature 411.6838 (2001): 684-687.
- Rybczynski, Natalia. Cranial morphology and phylogenetic significance of Suminia getmanovi, a Late Permian anomodont from Russia. 1997.
- Rybczynski, Natalia, et al. "A three-dimensional animation model of Edmontosaurus (Hadrosauridae) for testing chewing hypotheses." Palaeontologia Electronica 11 (2008): 14.
- Rybczynski, Natalia. "Castorid phylogenetics: implications for the evolution of swimming and tree-exploitation in beavers." Journal of Mammalian Evolution 14.1 (2007): 1-35.
- Ballantyne, A. P., et al. "Pliocene Arctic temperature constraints from the growth rings and isotopic composition of fossil larch." Palaeogeography, Palaeoclimatology, Palaeoecology 242.3 (2006): 188-200.
- Rybczynski, Natalia. "Cranial anatomy and phylogenetic position of Suminia getmanovi, a basal anomodont (Amniota: Therapsida) from the Late Permian of Eastern Europe." Zoological Journal of the Linnean Society 130.3 (2000): 329-373.
