= Dipoides =

Dipoides Temporal range: Late Miocene to Late Pliocene

Scientific classification
- Kingdom: Animalia
- Phylum: Chordata
- Class: Mammalia
- Order: Rodentia
- Family: Castoridae
- Tribe: †Castoroidini
- Genus: †Dipoides; Jäger, 1835

Extinct genus of rodents

Dipoides (possibly meaning "double form") is an extinct genus of beaver-grouped rodents.

Dipoides were approximately three to four times larger than modern Canadian beavers - ranging from 90 - 120KG. Where modern beavers have square chisel shaped teeth, Dipoides teeth were rounded. However an excavation of a site that was once a marsh, in Ellesmere Island, showed signs that they dined on bark and young trees, like modern beavers. The excavation seemed to show that, like modern beavers, Dipoides dammed streams. Other research suggests that the building of dams by Dipoides started as a side effect to the consumption of wood and bark, and was a specialization that evolved for cold weather survival due to the earth's cooling during the late Neogene period.

Natalia Rybczynski, of the Canadian Museum of Nature, analyzed the teeth, and wood chips, of modern beavers, and Dipoides. She concluded that they all used just one of their teeth at a time, when cutting down trees. She concluded that modern beavers' square teeth required half as many bites as Dipoides' less evolved round teeth.

Rybczynski argues that eating bark and building dams are unlikely to have evolved twice, so modern beavers and Dipoides shared a wood-eating common ancestor, 24 million years ago.
