= Necromites =

Necromites Temporal range: Upper Pliocene

Scientific classification
- Kingdom: Animalia
- Phylum: Chordata
- Class: Mammalia
- Order: Carnivora
- Family: †Semantoridae
- Genus: †Necromites; V. V. Bogachev. 1940
- Species: †N. nestoris

Binomial name
- †Necromites nestoris V. V. Bogachev. 1940

Extinct genus of stem-pinniped

Necromites is extinct genus of stem-pinniped belonging to the extinct family Semantoridae during the upper Pliocene epoch. It is a monotypic genus with the only species in this genus being Necromites nestoris.

It was named in honor of Nestor Smirnov, a Soviet specialist in Pinnipeds.
