= Eodesmus =

Eodesmus Temporal range: Miocene

Scientific classification
- Kingdom: Animalia
- Phylum: Chordata
- Class: Mammalia
- Order: Carnivora
- Parvorder: Pinnipedia
- Family: †Desmatophocidae
- Genus: †Eodesmus; Tate-Jones et al., 2020
- Species: †E. condoni

Binomial name
- †Eodesmus condoni Tate-Jones et al., 2020

Most basal member of Desmatophocidae

Eodesmus is an extinct genus of pinniped that belongs to the family Desmatophocidae. It lived in Oregon during the Miocene epoch. The only species belonging to this genus is Eodesmus condoni making it a monotypic genus.

Based on phylogenetic analyses, Eodesmus is likely the most basal genus of the family.

The genus is represented by a nearly complete cranium that was found in the Burdigalian Iron Mountain Bed of the Astoria Formation located in Oregon, United States. The discovery of this genus in an already pinniped-rich region shows that pinnipeds had an increase species diversity during the Middle Miocene Climatic Optimum.
