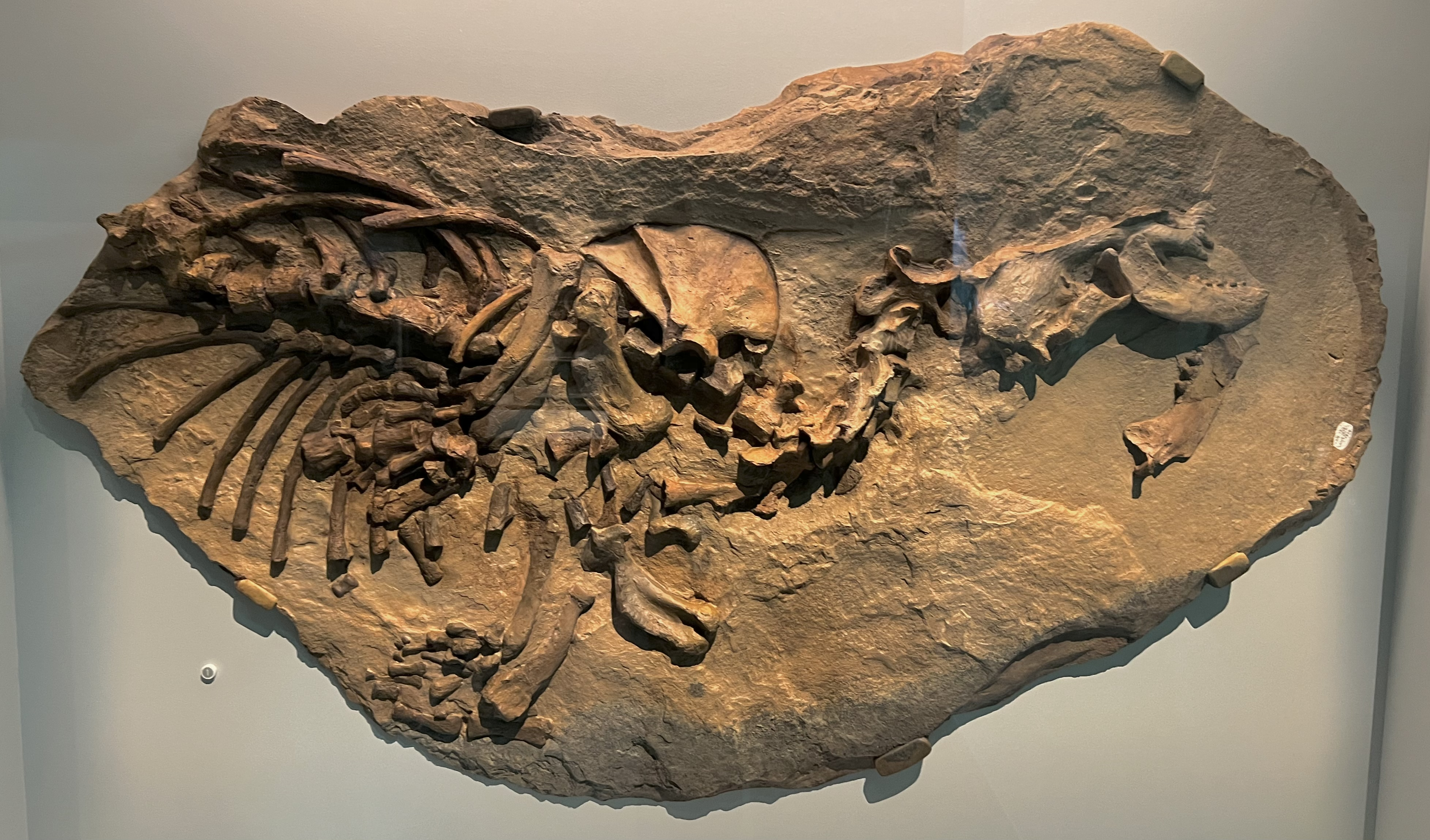
- Fossil cast of the holotype skeleton of Atopotarus courseni at the Natural History Museum of Los Angeles County

Scientific classification
- Kingdom: Animalia
- Phylum: Chordata
- Class: Mammalia
- Order: Carnivora
- Parvorder: Pinnipedia
- Family: †Desmatophocidae
- Genus: †Atopotarus; Downs, 1956

Species
- †A. courseni Downs, 1956

= Atopotarus =

Atopotarus Temporal range: Middle Miocene

Extinct genus of pinniped

Atopotarus is an extinct genus of pinniped from the middle Miocene of Los Angeles County, California. It is a monotypic genus, with the only known species being Atopotarus courseni, or commonly referred to as 'Coursen's Strange Seal;' the species name 'courseni' is attributed to the Coursen family that discovered the fossil in 1952 on their Palos Verdes residence. This species belongs to the extinct family Desmatophocidae, an early lineage of seal-like pinnipeds from the North Pacific.

Only one specimen of this genus has been found. The holotype, LACM 1376, was discovered in the rocks of the Altamira Shale of the Monterey Formation. A fossil cast of the holotype is currently on display at the Natural History Museum of Los Angeles County (LACM).

== Taxonomy ==
Atopotarus courseni has been sometimes considered to be a species within Allodesmus, but most recent phylogenetic analysis retains it as a separate genus and a sister taxon to Allodesmus. It can be distinguished from other desmatophocids based on differences in the skull and teeth. Notable differences in the skull include an elongated cranium with large crests, lack of a pre-narial shelf, and the elongated mastoid process, where neck muscles attach and blood vessels flow through, which protrudes ventral to level of the postglenoid process. Differences in the teeth include double rooted premolars as opposed to the single rooted premolars of related genera, smaller canines, and the lack of a second molar.

== Description ==
The only specimen of Atopotarus is an incomplete articulated skeleton preserved in a slab of rock, with material from the skull to part of the spine, ending before the pelvis. It includes the skull, most teeth, jaws, cervical vertebrae, ribs, some dorsal vertebrae, and elements of the forelimbs, with outlines of the carpals and metacarpals.

Both Atopotarus and modern eared seals share similarly long and well developed neck structures, which is used to allow flexible movements for hunting prey underwater and swimming. It also possessed unusually strong canines and thick jaws, indicating a strong bite force.

As with other members of its family, Atopotarus possessed large orbits, which would indicate that they relied heavily on eyesight for hunting, and may have been deep divers.

While no modern descendants of this genus exist today, they may have been most ecologically similar to elephant seals, due to similarities in eye size that indicate deep-diving hunting strategies.
