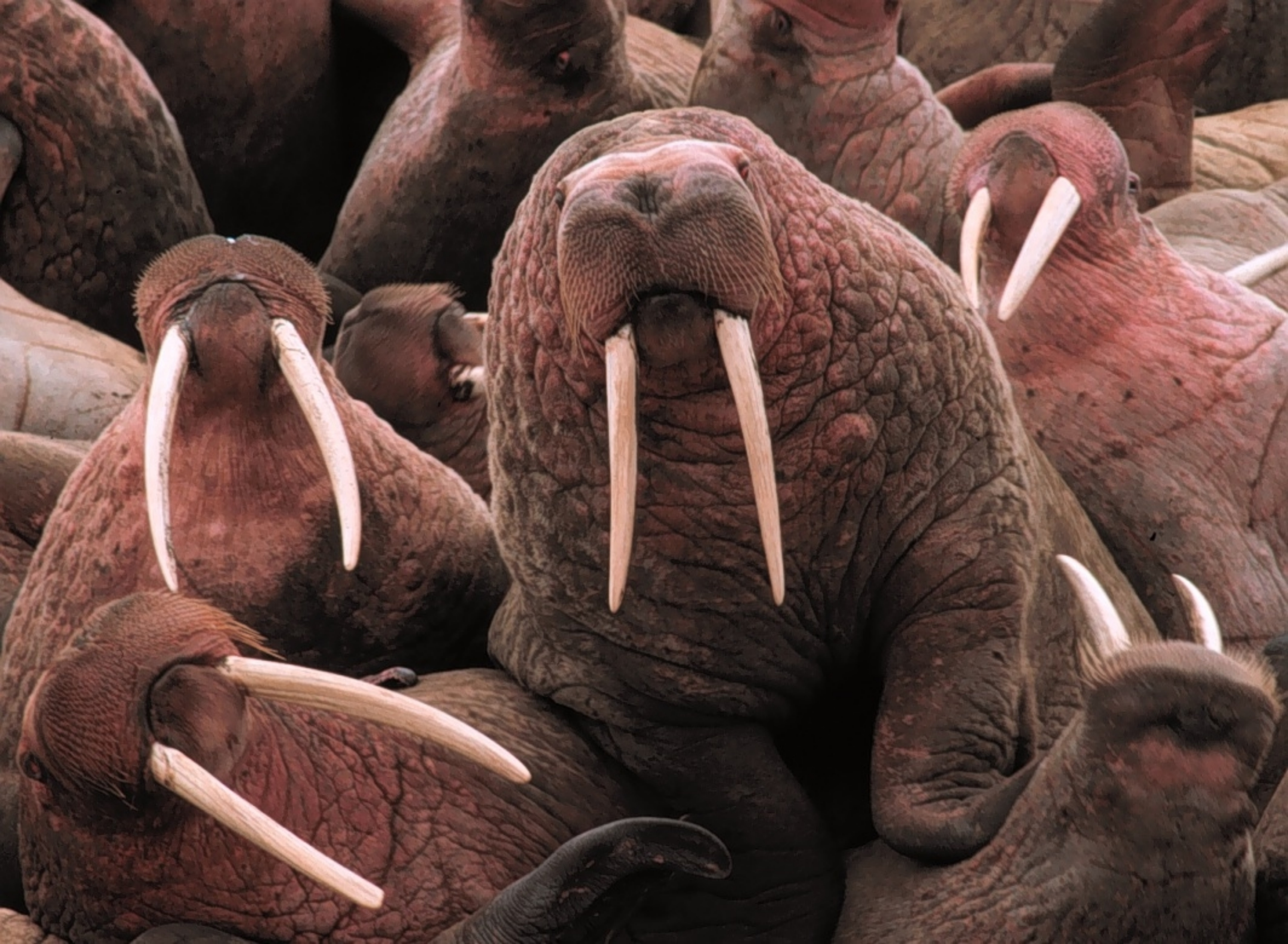
- A rookery of walruses (Odobenus rosmarus)
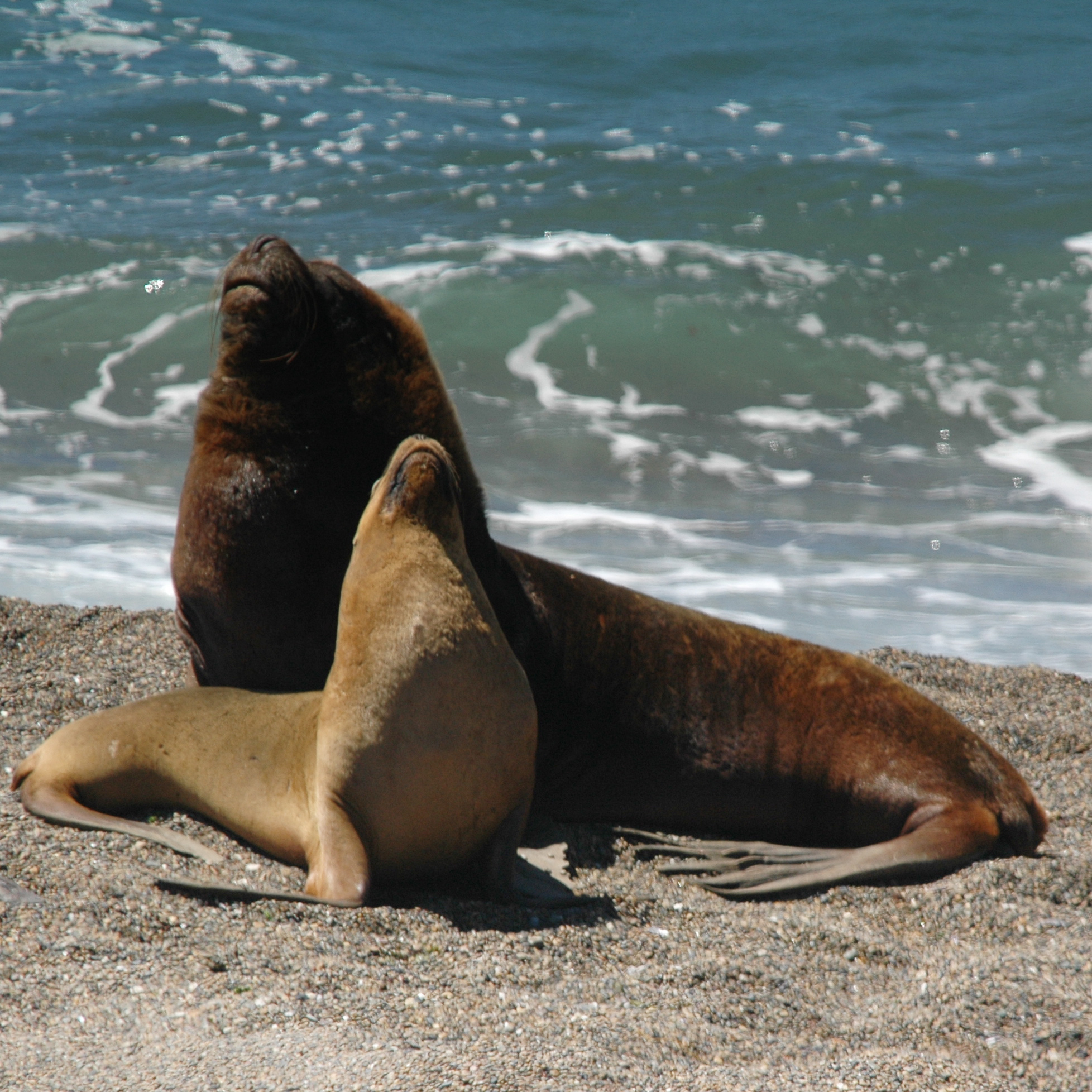
- A male and female South American sea lion (Otaria flavescens)

Scientific classification
- Kingdom: Animalia
- Phylum: Chordata
- Class: Mammalia
- Order: Carnivora
- Parvorder: Pinnipedia
- Superfamily: Otarioidea; J. E. Gray, 1821

Subclades
- Family †Desmatophocidae; Family Odobenidae; Clade Panotariidae Velez-Juarbe, 2017; †Eotaria; Otariidae

= Otarioidea =

Otarioidea Temporal range: Oligocene–Holocene, 24–0 Ma

Superfamily of carnivores

Otarioidea is a superfamily of pinnipeds that includes the families Odobenidae (walruses), Otariidae (eared seals, such as sea lions and fur seals), and their stem-relatives. In the past when the pinnipeds were considered to be a polyphyletic group of marine mammals, a few points of cranial and dental morphology suggested that the otarioids originated from a line of bears. One extinct family, Enaliarctidae, was postulated to be otarioids that were a transitional clade between Hemicyoninae (an extinct subfamily of dog-like bears) and Otariidae. Recent comprehensive studies have, however, since the 1990s found pinnipeds to be a monophyletic clade of aquatic arctoids. There are a few authorities that place desmatophocids and odobenids as sister taxa to Phocidae in the clade Phocomorpha based on a few minor physiological features.
