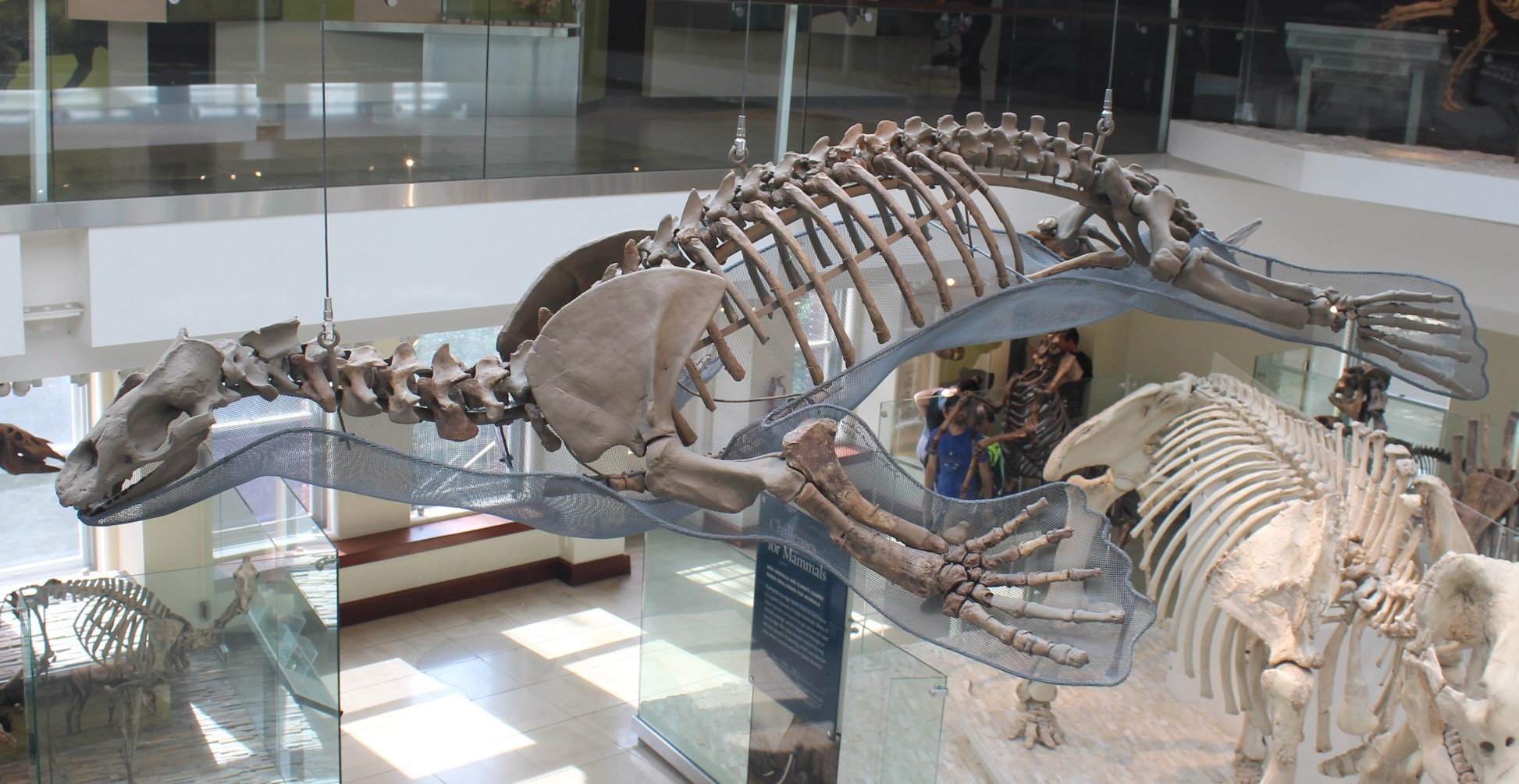
- Skeleton of A. gracilis at the Natural History Museum of Los Angeles County

Scientific classification
- Kingdom: Animalia
- Phylum: Chordata
- Class: Mammalia
- Infraclass: Placentalia
- Order: Carnivora
- Parvorder: Pinnipedia
- Family: †Desmatophocidae
- Genus: †Allodesmus; Kellogg, 1922

Species
- A. demerei Boessenecker and Churchill, 2018; A. kernensis Kellogg, 1922; A. naorai Kohno, 1996; A. packardi (Barnes, 1972); A. sadoensis Barnes and Hirota, 1995; A. sinanoenis (Nagao, 1941); A. uraiporensis Tonomori, Sawamura, Sato, and Kohno, 2018

= Allodesmus =

Allodesmus Temporal range: Miocene

Extinct genus of carnivores

Allodesmus is an extinct genus of pinniped from the middle to late Miocene of California and Japan that belongs to the extinct pinniped family Desmatophocidae.

== Description and biology ==
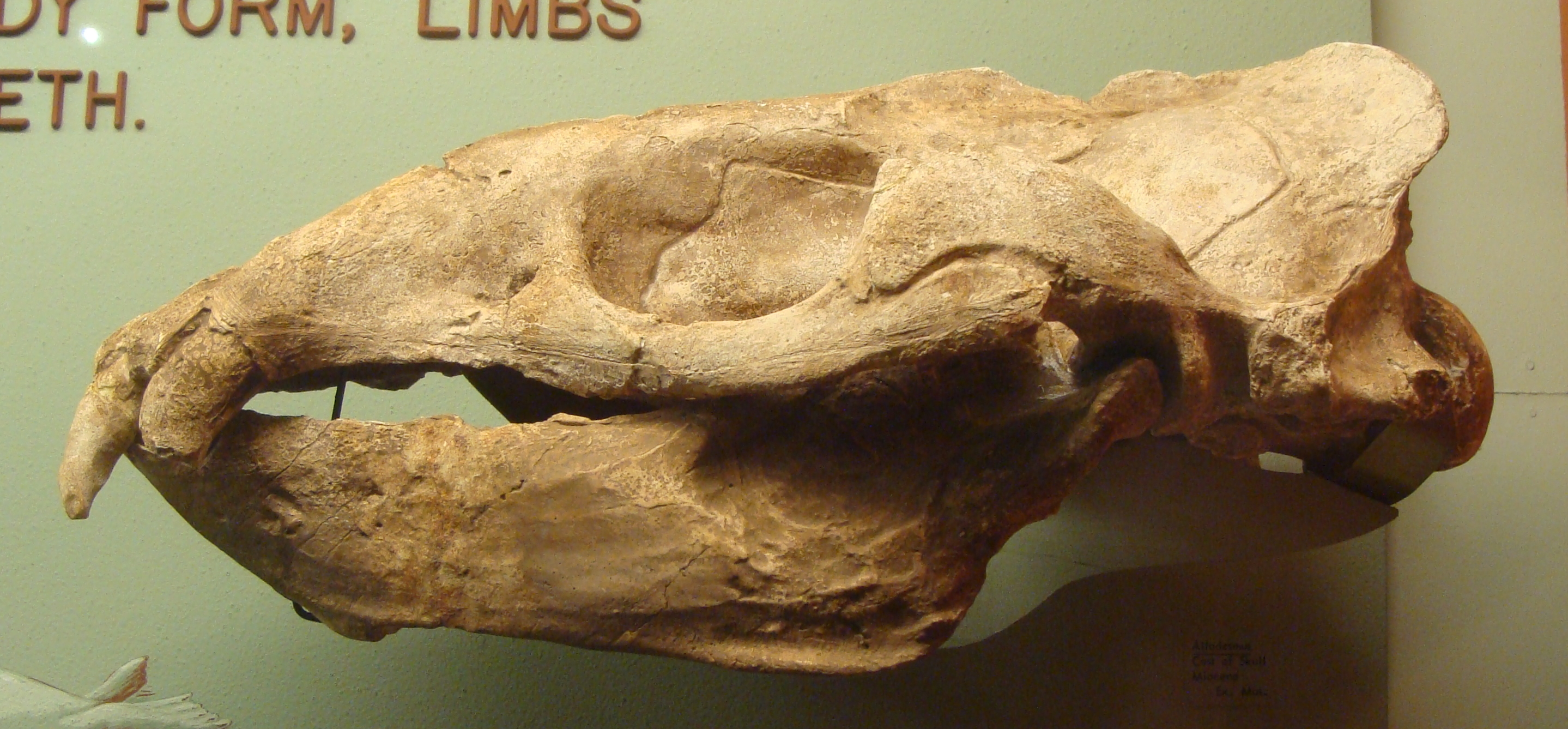
Allodesmus skull

Allodesmus measured about 8 feet (2.4 m) long and weighed 800 pounds (360 kg). Allodesmus had the specific anatomical features found in modern polygynous pinnipeds: sexual dimorphism, strong canines for fights between bulls and teeth with well-defined growth zones, a result from periodic fasting (in order to defend their harem, males would not take to the sea to feed during the breeding season).

== Taxonomy ==
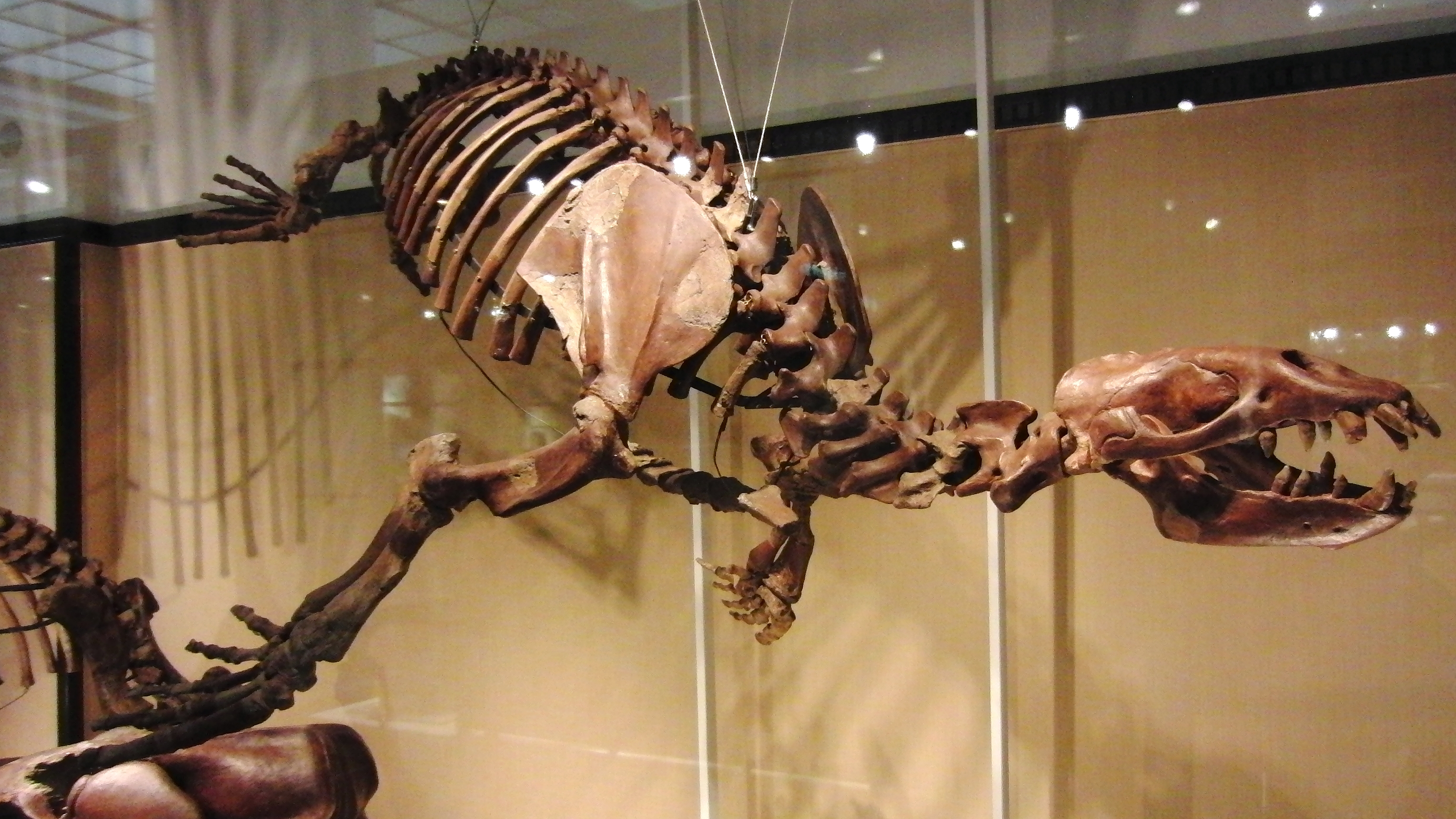
Skeleton of Allodesmus at the National Museum of Nature and Science, Tokyo, Japan.

Allodesmus sinanoensis and A. packardi were previously assigned separate genera, Megagomphos and Brachyallodesmus, respectively, but many authors questioned this generic distinction, and the cladistic analysis by Boessenecker and Churchill (2018) found no support for this generic scheme. Atopotarus, referred to Allodesmus by some authors (e.g. Mitchell 1966), is distinct from Allodesmus by the absence of a prenarial shelf and M2, double-rooted cheek teeth, a small, triangular postorbital process, and a mastoid process projecting ventral to the postglenoid process.
