= Semantor =

Semantor Temporal range: Upper Miocene

Scientific classification
- Kingdom: Animalia
- Phylum: Chordata
- Class: Mammalia
- Order: Carnivora
- Family: †Semantoridae
- Genus: †Semantor
- Species: †S. macrurus

Binomial name
- †Semantor macrurus Orlov, 1931

Extinct genus of stem-pinniped

Semantor is an extinct genus of stem-pinniped that belongs to and is the type genus for the family Semantoridae. It lived in Kazakhstan during the upper Miocene epoch. It is a monotypic genus containing one species, Semantor macrurus.

It has characteristics similar to that of otters and seals possibly occupying a similar life-style but part of a different clade of animals.
