= Pacificotaria =

Pacificotaria Temporal range: Early-middle Miocene

Scientific classification
- Kingdom: Animalia
- Phylum: Chordata
- Class: Mammalia
- Order: Carnivora
- Clade: Pinnipedimorpha
- Clade: Pinnipediformes
- Genus: †Pacificotaria; Barnes, 1992
- Species: †P. hadromma

Binomial name
- †Pacificotaria hadromma Barnes, 1992

Extinct genus of basal pinniped

Pacificotaria is an extinct genus of basal pinnipediform that lived in Oregon during the early to middle Miocene epoch. The only species of this genus is Pacificotaria hadromma making it a monotypic genus.

It is a possible junior synonym of Pteronarctos. However, it is distinguished from its protruding orbits that is positioned further anteriorly on the cranium, its larger bony nares, a robust rostrum, a vaulted palate, and straighter upper cheek tooth rows.
