= Pteronarctos =

Pteronarctos Temporal range: Middle Miocene, 16–11.6 Ma

Scientific classification
- Kingdom: Animalia
- Phylum: Chordata
- Class: Mammalia
- Order: Carnivora
- Clade: Pinnipediformes
- Genus: †Pteronarctos; Barnes, 1989

Species
- P. goedertae Barnes, 1989 (type); P. piersoni Barnes, 1990

Extinct genus of mammals

Pteronarctos is a genus of basal pinnipediform from middle Miocene marine deposits in Oregon.

Two species of Pteronarctos are known, P. goedertae and P. piersoni. Although originally described as a member of Enaliarctidae, cladistic analyses place Pteronarctos as sister to pinnipeds, in the clade Pinnipediformes.
