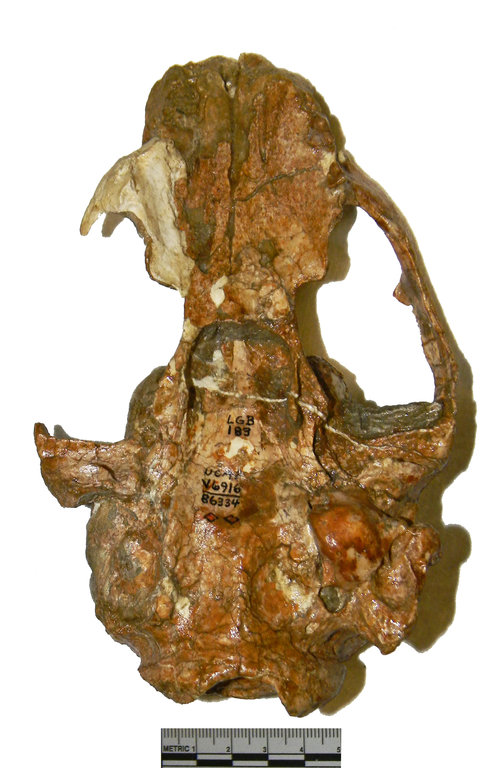

Scientific classification
- Kingdom: Animalia
- Phylum: Chordata
- Class: Mammalia
- Order: Carnivora
- Clade: Pinnipedimorpha
- Clade: Pinnipediformes
- Genus: †Pinnarctidion; Barnes, 1979

Species
- Pinnarctidion bishopi; Pinnarctidion rayi

= Pinnarctidion =

Pinnarctidion Temporal range: Early Miocene

Extinct genus of basal pinnipediform

Pinnarctidion is an extinct genus of basal pinnipediform that lived in California and Oregon during the early Miocene epoch. There are currently two species in this genus, Pinnarctidion bishopi and Pinnarctidion rayi. It used to be classified closely to Phocoidea (earless seals) but was later placed as a stem pinniped.

It, along with other early pinnipedimorphs, were coastal species feeding on aquatic prey such as fish.
