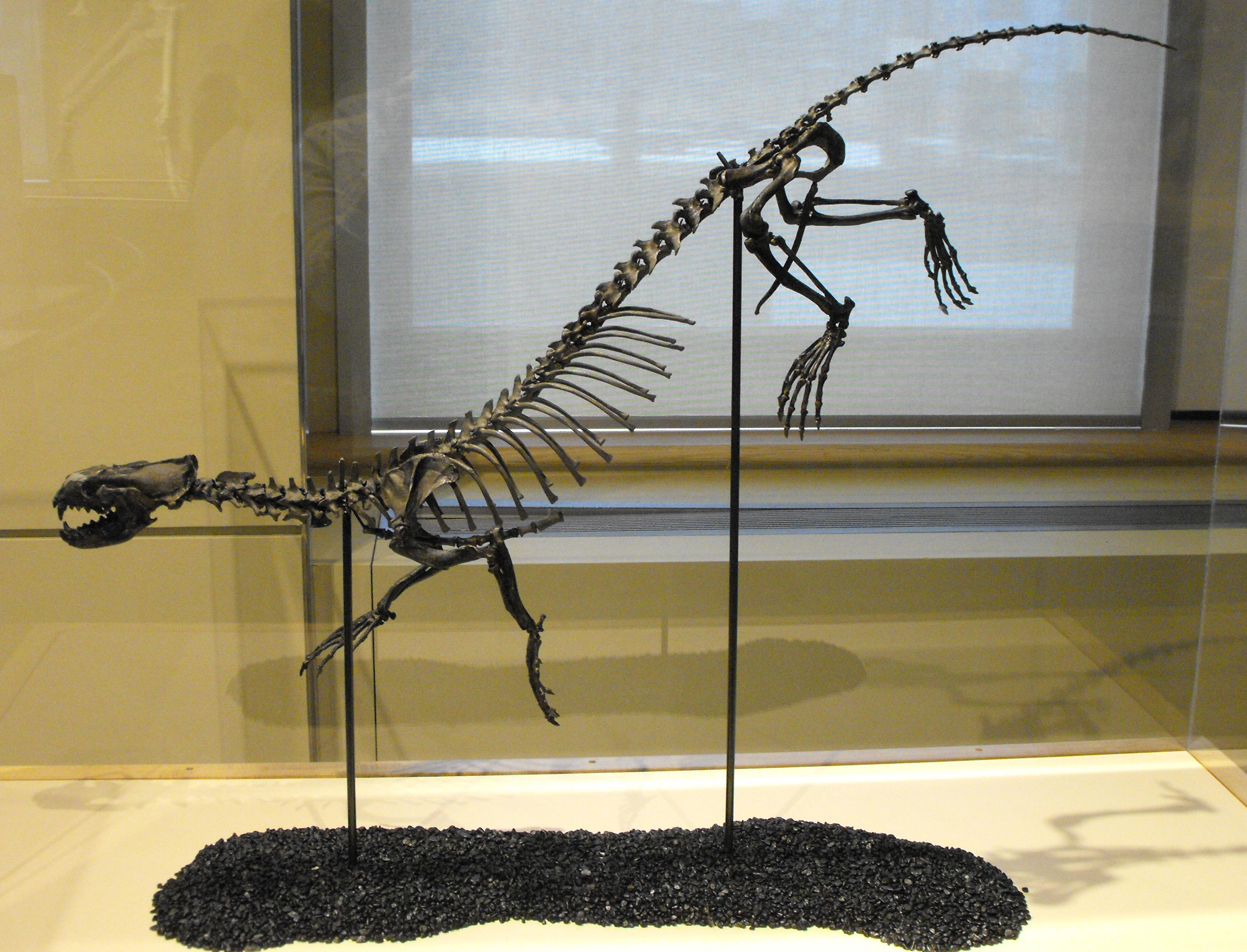
- Restored skeleton of Puijila darwini

Scientific classification
- Kingdom: Animalia
- Phylum: Chordata
- Class: Mammalia
- Order: Carnivora
- Clade: Pan-Pinnipedia
- Family: †Semantoridae; Orlov, 1931

Genera
- Semantor Orlov, 1931; type; Necromites V. V. Bogachev. 1940; Potamotherium Geoffroy, 1833; Puijila Rybczynski et al., 2009

= Semantoridae =

Semantoridae Temporal range: Late Oligocene - Late Miocene, 24–7.25 Ma

Extinct family of mammals

Semantoridae is an extinct family of stem-pinnipeds with fossils found in France, Kazakhstan, and Canada that date back to various times in the Miocene epoch. Based on their overall anatomy, semantorids were not marine specialists, as their elongated bodies, a long tail and robust limbs suggest they were freshwater animals not unlike otters. Indeed, at least some taxa, such as Semantor and Potamotherium, were initially classified as mustelids closely related to otters.
