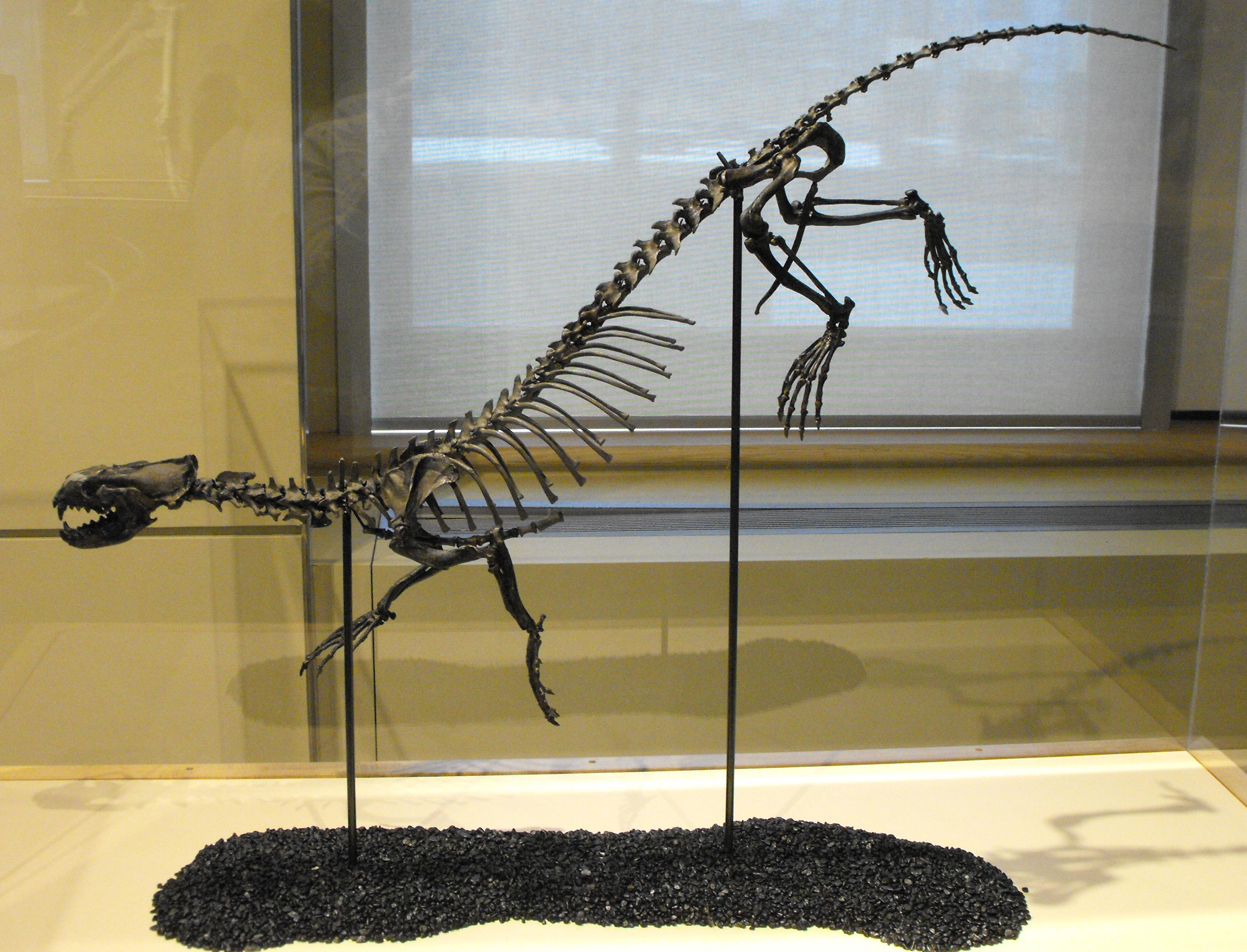
- Restored skeleton

Scientific classification
- Kingdom: Animalia
- Phylum: Chordata
- Class: Mammalia
- Order: Carnivora
- Family: †Semantoridae
- Genus: †Puijila; Rybczynski et al., 2009
- Species: †P. darwini

Binomial name
- †Puijila darwini Rybczynski et al., 2009

= Puijila =

Puijila Temporal range: Late Oligocene - Early Miocene, 24–21 Ma

Extinct genus of primitive pinnipeds

Puijila darwini is an extinct species of stem-pinniped (seal) which lived during the Miocene about 21 to 24 million years ago. About a metre (3 feet) long, the animal had only minimal physical adaptations for swimming. Unlike modern pinnipeds, it did not have flippers and its shape was otter-like, albeit more specialized; its skull and teeth are the features that most clearly indicate that it is a seal.

It is considered to be the most primitive pinnipedimorph yet found. The genus name is an Inuktitut word for a young seal; the species name honours Charles Darwin. The holotype and only known specimen is a nearly complete fossil skeleton found in the Haughton Formation on Devon Island in the high Canadian Arctic. It is housed at the Canadian Museum of Nature, Ottawa, Ontario.

== Background ==
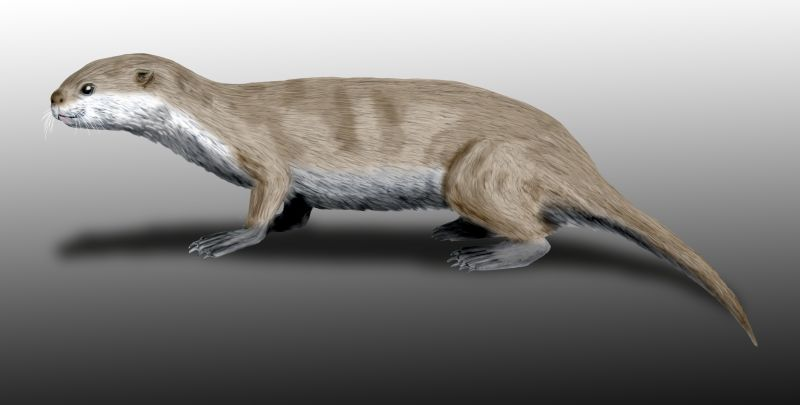
Restoration

Puijila darwini was a semi-aquatic carnivore which represents a morphological link in early pinniped evolution. Its fossil shows enlarged, probably webbed feet, robust forelimbs and an unspecialized tail. This suggests that Puijila swam quadrupedally using its webbed fore and hind feet for propulsion. Phylogenetic studies including molecular evidence suggest a sister relationship between seals, bears and musteloids (weasels and otters). It had been popularly assumed that land mammals at some point transitioned to being more marine, in essence "returning to the sea" in order to gain some sort of survival advantage. However, fossil evidence of this transition had been weak or contentious. The discovery of Puijila is important as it represents a morphological link in early seal evolution, and one that appears to morphologically precede the more familiarly structured genus Enaliarctos, despite apparently being a younger genus. In other words, Puijila is a transitional fossil that provides information about how the seals returned to the sea, similar to how Archaeopteryx illuminates the origin of birds.

== Discovery ==
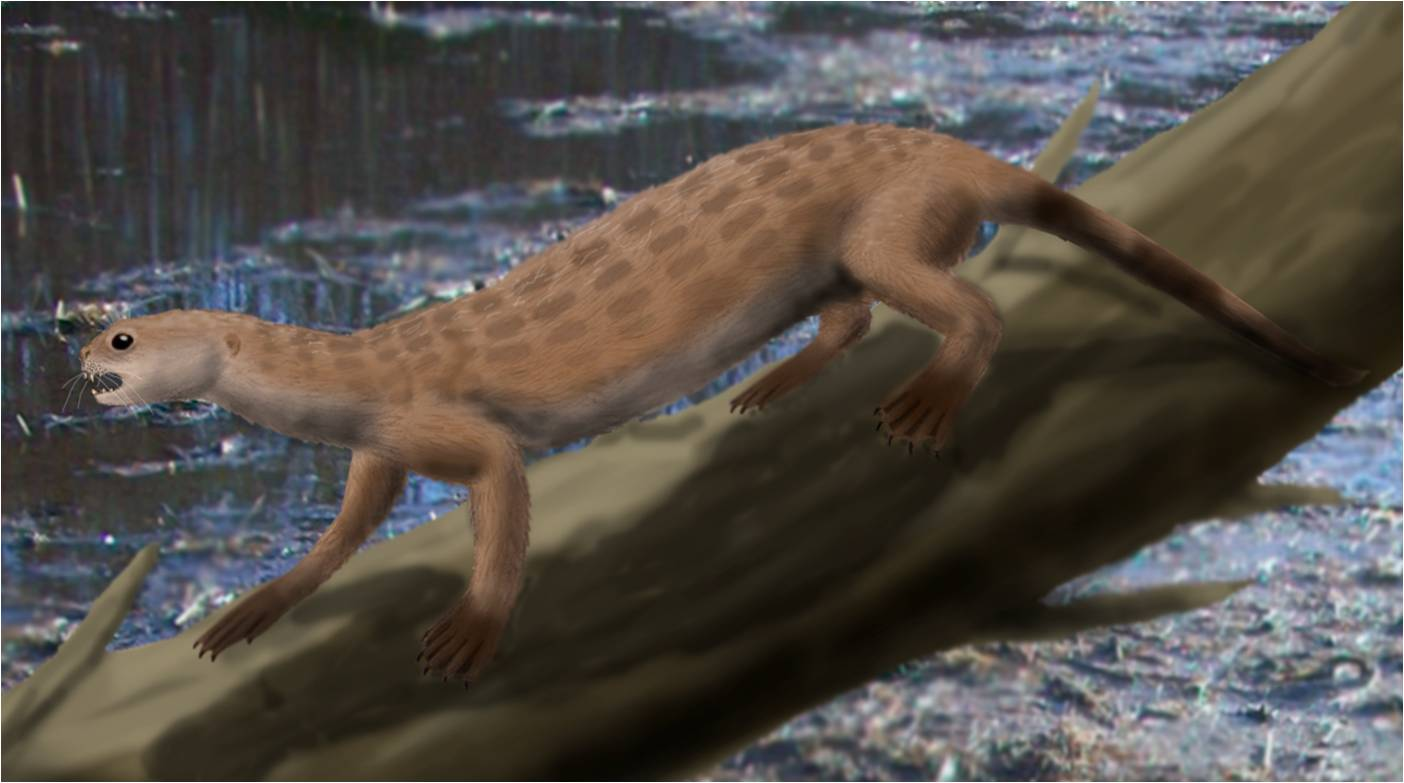
Life restoration of Puijila darwini

This novel species was discovered in 2007 by Natalia Rybczynski and her team using surface collection and screening at an early Miocene lake deposit of the Haughton Formation of Devon Island, Nunavut, Canada. The paleobotanical record suggests that the paleoenvironment around the lake comprised a forest community transitional between a boreal and a conifer–hardwood forest, in a cool temperate, coastal climate with moderate winters. Puijila darwini is the first mammalian carnivore found in the Haughton lake deposits. This is also an indication that the entire pinniped clade may have originated in the Arctic.

The initial find is credited to field assistant Elizabeth Ross, and was partly a matter of luck. Ross had been unexpectedly stranded with the team's ATV which had run out of fuel several kilometers from base camp. The brain case was discovered a year later on the first day of the 2008 field expedition by Martin Lipman, the team's photographer.
