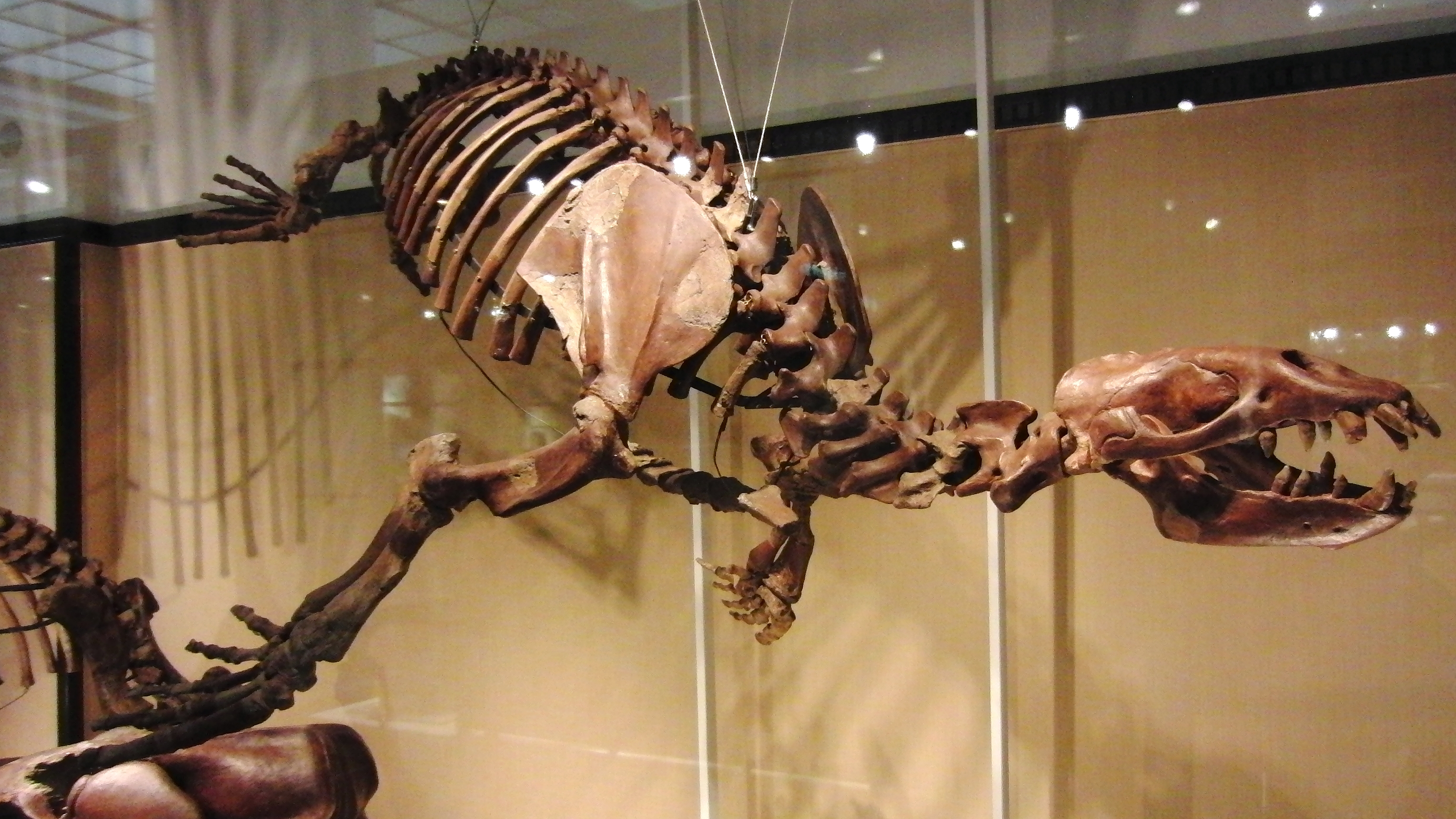
- Skeleton of Allodesmus sp. at the National Museum of Nature and Science, Tokyo, Japan
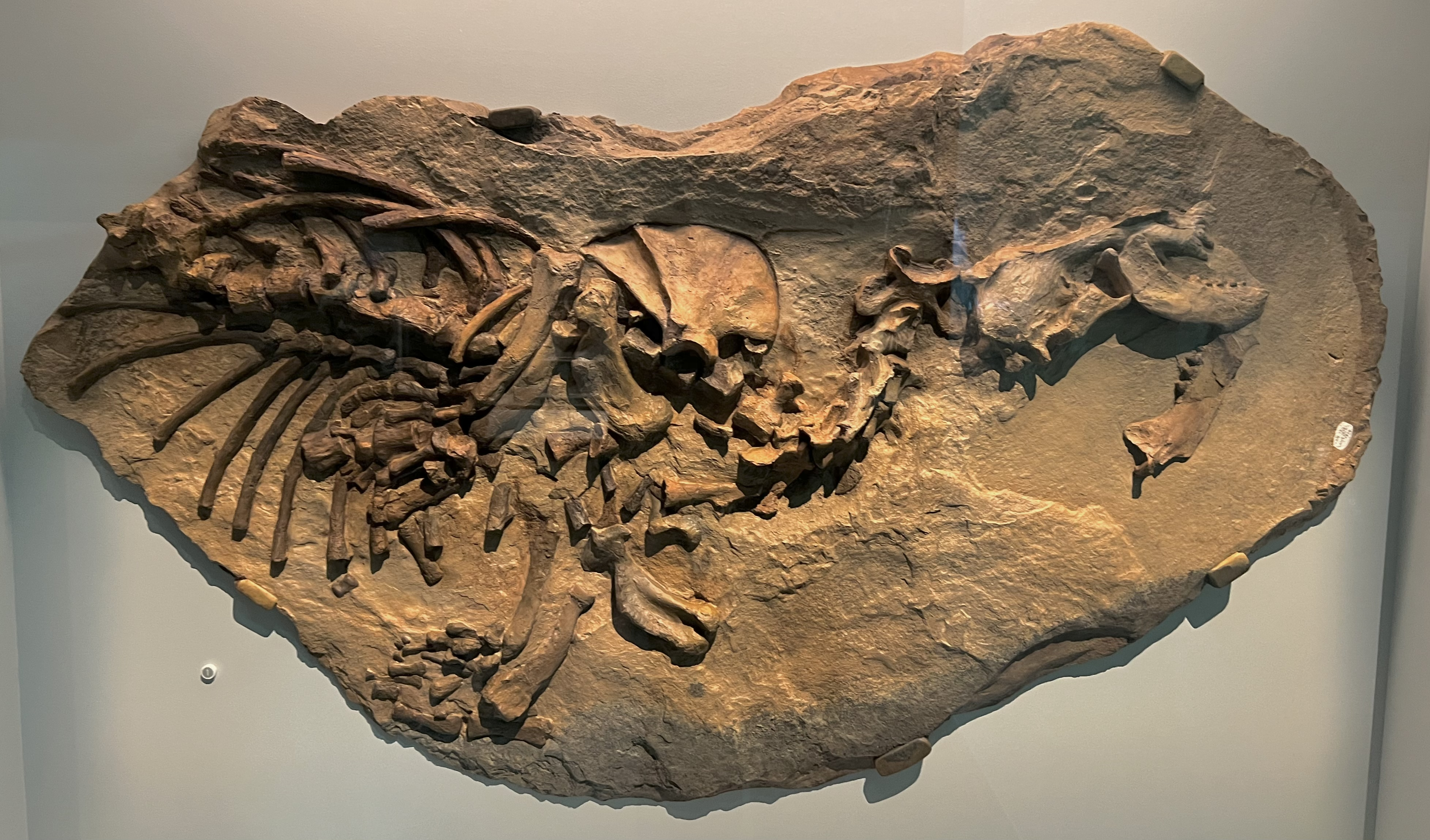
- Holotype skeleton of Atopotarus courseni at the Natural History Museum of Los Angeles County

Scientific classification
- Kingdom: Animalia
- Phylum: Chordata
- Class: Mammalia
- Infraclass: Placentalia
- Order: Carnivora
- Parvorder: Pinnipedia
- Superfamily: Otarioidea
- Family: †Desmatophocidae

Genera
- Allodesmus; Atopotarus; Desmatophoca; Eodesmus

= Desmatophocidae =

Desmatophocidae Temporal range: Early to Late Miocene

Family of mammals

Desmatophocidae is an extinct family of pinnipeds closely related to either the eared seals and walruses or to the earless seals. These animals were the first group of large-bodied pinnipeds to evolve, first appearing in the Early Miocene, with no direct modern descendants. Desmatophocids have only been found to live in the North Pacific, with fossils being found in Baja California, California, Oregon, Washington, and Japan.

The group is generally known for having large orbits, bulbous cheek teeth, and forelimbs similar to extant eared seals.

== Genera ==
- Allodesmus
- Atopotarus
- Desmatophoca
- Eodesmus
