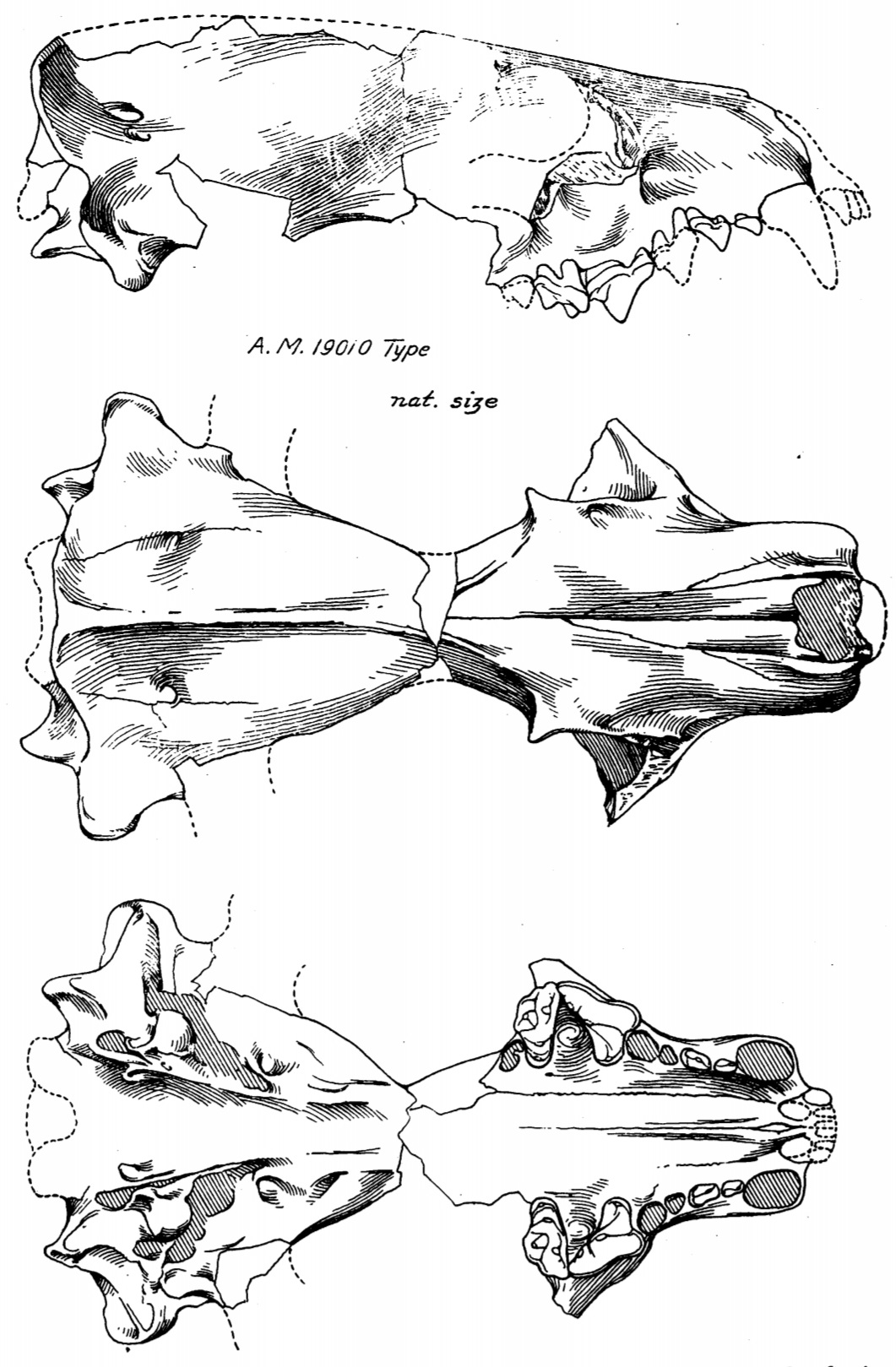
- Holotype skull of Amphicticeps shackelfordi

Scientific classification
- Kingdom: Animalia
- Phylum: Chordata
- Class: Mammalia
- Order: Carnivora
- Family: †Amphicynodontidae
- Genus: †Amphicticeps; Matthew & Granger, 1924

Type species
- †Amphicticeps shackelfordi Matthew & Granger, 1924

Other species
- A. dorog Wang et al., 2005; A. makhchinus Wang et al., 2005

= Amphicticeps =

Amphicticeps Temporal range: Early Oligocene, 33.9–28.4 Ma

Extinct genus of carnivores

Amphicticeps is an extinct genus of small, weasel-like carnivoran mammal. It lived in Mongolia during the Oligocene. The genus was erected in 1924 for the species A. shackelfordi on the basis of a well-preserved skull. Historically, the systematic position of this genus has been problematic until more specimens were described decades later.

== History of discovery ==
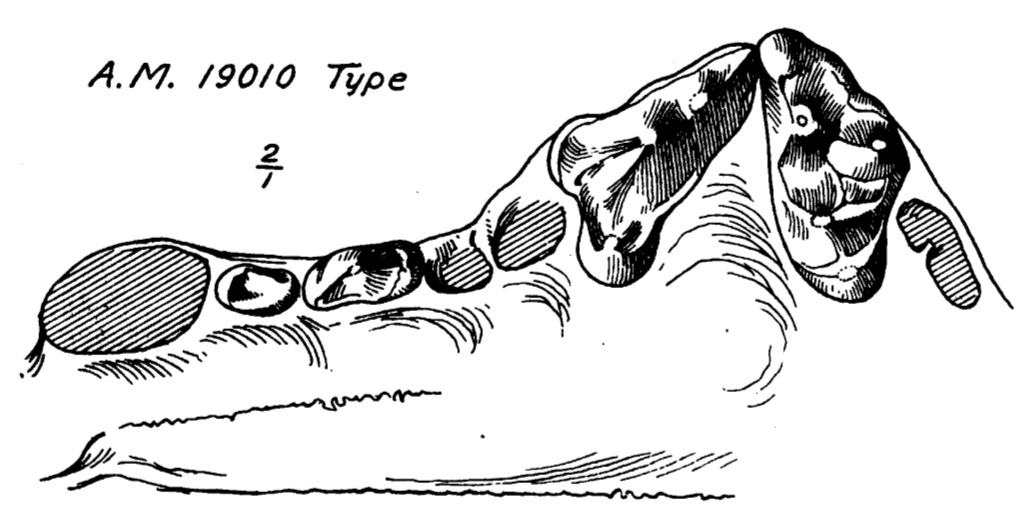
Lower jaw of the A. shackelfordi holotype

The type specimen of Amphicticeps shackelfordi (AMNH 19010) is an almost complete skull. It was discovered during the 1922 field season of the Central Asiatic Expeditions around 2 miles southwest of the Loh campsite in Övörkhangai Province, Mongolia. This locality is part of the Oligocene-aged Hsanda Gol Formation. Though several other jaw elements were also collected, these were not figured or assigned to Amphicticeps in the original description as they could not be firmly associated with the type skull. During the 1994 field season of the Mongolian Academy of Sciences and the American Museum of Natural History joint expeditions, a naturally associated set of lower and upper jaws of A. shackelfordi was found, and the previously known jaw elements can now be confidently assigned to this species.

=== Assigned species ===
In addition to the type species, two more species of Amphicticeps were described by Wang et al. in 2005:

A. dorog is currently known exclusively from teeth and jaw elements found in the top of the Tatal Member of the Hsanda Gol Formation, Mongolia. The type specimen (MAE SG.9194) is a fragment of the right maxilla with premolars and molars, and several additional fragments of rami and maxillae are assigned to this species. The specific name is a Mongolian word for 'badger'. This species is believed to be an intermediate form between the less-derived A. shackelfordi and more derived A. makhchinus based on the size and characters of its teeth.

The least-known of the three species, A. makhchinus is known only from the holotype specimen (MAE 93–213) consisting of a right maxillary fragment with preserved teeth. The specimen was collected from the Tatal Member of the Hsanda Gol Formation, Mongolia. The specific name is a Mongolian word meaning 'meat-eater' or 'carnivore', as tooth features indicate this species was the most hypercarnivorous species in the genus. Based on the premolar labial length, A. makhchinus is the largest known species of the Amphicticeps genus, being 32% larger than A. shackelfordi and 16% larger than A. dorog.

== Description ==
Amphicticeps was a small-sized mammal, with the type skull of A. shackelfordi (the smallest species) measuring 8.7 cm from nasal tip to inion. The skull is strongly built for a carnivoran of this size, with a broad and short rostrum, and moderately sized canine teeth. The first upper molar has a postprotocrista, enlarged parastyle and no lingual notch on the entoconid crest. The second upper molar is lingually positioned and reduced, and the third upper molar is either very reduced entirely lost. The upper fourth premolar has a carnassial notch and the suprameatal fossa is shallow, these features being primitive compared to the condition seen mustelids.

== Classification and systematics ==
The classification of Amphicticeps has historically been problematic. In their initial description of the genus, Matthew and Granger (1924) suggested it to be a "highly progressive miacid" rather than placing it in any existing carnivoran family. Later authors have assigned it to Arctoidea based on dental or cranial features. Schmidt-Kittler (1981) noted the basicranium to have features matching arctoids, and deemed it not to belong in Musteloidea due to its shallow suprameatal fossa and the form of its molars, thus regarding it to be a "basal arctoid" that emerged before the development of Musteloidea. Hunt (1996) proposed that Amphicticeps may belong in the family Amphicynodontidae, a classification which was followed by Wang and Qiu (2003).

Wang et al. (2005) conducted a phylogenetic analysis finding Amphicticeps to be a basal ursoid, being the earliest-diverging member of the clade containing it, Amphicynodon, Ursidae and Phocoidea. The cladogram results of their phylogenetic analyses are displayed in the cladogram below:

- - Arctoidea
    - Ursida
      - Amphicticeps
      - - Amphicynodon
        - - Ursidae
            Cephalogale
          - Phocoidea (Pinnipedia)
            - Allocyon
            - Pachycynodon
    - Mustelida
      - Mustelavus
      - - - Procyonidae
          - - Amphictis
            - - Simocyon
              - Ailuridae
                Ailurus
        - - Bavarictis
          - Mustelictis
          - - Pseudobassaris
            - - Plesictis
              - - Potamotherium
                - Promartes
                - Mustelidae

In their description of Eoarctos, Wang et al. (2023) conducted a phylogenetic analysis recovering Amphicticeps as the earliest-diverging pinniped. Their results are shown in the cladogram below:

- - Arctoidea
    - Cynodictis spp.
    - - Gustafsonia cognita
      - - Amphicyonidae
        - - Ursoidea
            - Subparictidae
            - Ursidae
              - Amphicynodon leptorhynchus
              - Campylocynodon personi
              - - Drassonax harpagops
                - Pachycynodon spp.
              - - Allocyon loganensis
                - - Cephalogale spp.
                  - Ursus arctos
          - - Zodiolestes daimonelixensis
            - - Pinnipedia
                - Amphicticeps shackelfordi
                - - - Potamotherium valletoni
                    - Puijila darwini
                  - - Enaliarctos spp.
                    - - Pteronarctos spp.
                      - Otariidae
              - Musteloidea

== Paleoecology ==
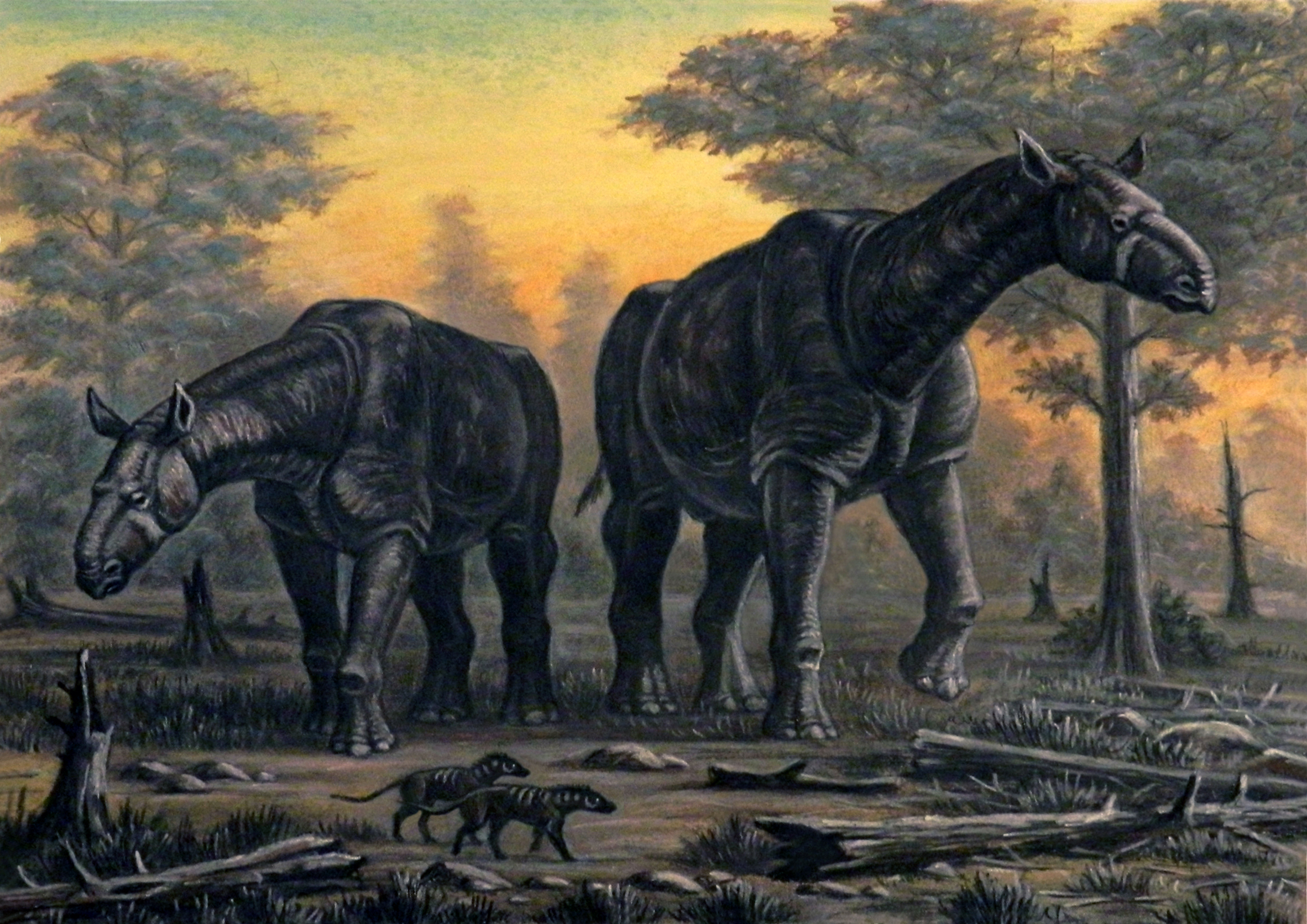
Artist's depiction of the Hsanda Gol Formation with Paraceratherium and Hyaenodon

All known species of Amphicticeps hail from the Hsanda Gol Formation, which is dated to around 33.4 to 31 million years ago (early Oligocene). This formation is believed to have been deposited in an open, semiarid steppe environment with playa lakes and ephemeral rivers. In this habitat, Amphicticeps lived alongside a wide variety of small mammals including various rodents, the leporid Desmatolagus, and the erinaceid Palaeoscaptor. Sympatric predators included several species of Hyaenodon, the stenoplesictids Shandgolictis and Asiavorator, the feliforms Nimravus and Palaeogale, the amphicynodontid Amphicynodon and the didymoconids Didymoconus and Ergilictis. The largest animal living alongside Amphicticeps in this formation was Paraceratherium transouralicum, a giant hornless rhinocerotoid.
