= Hsanda Gol Formation =

Geological formation in central Mongolia

- Stratigraphic range: Hsandagolian; ~33.4–31.0 Ma
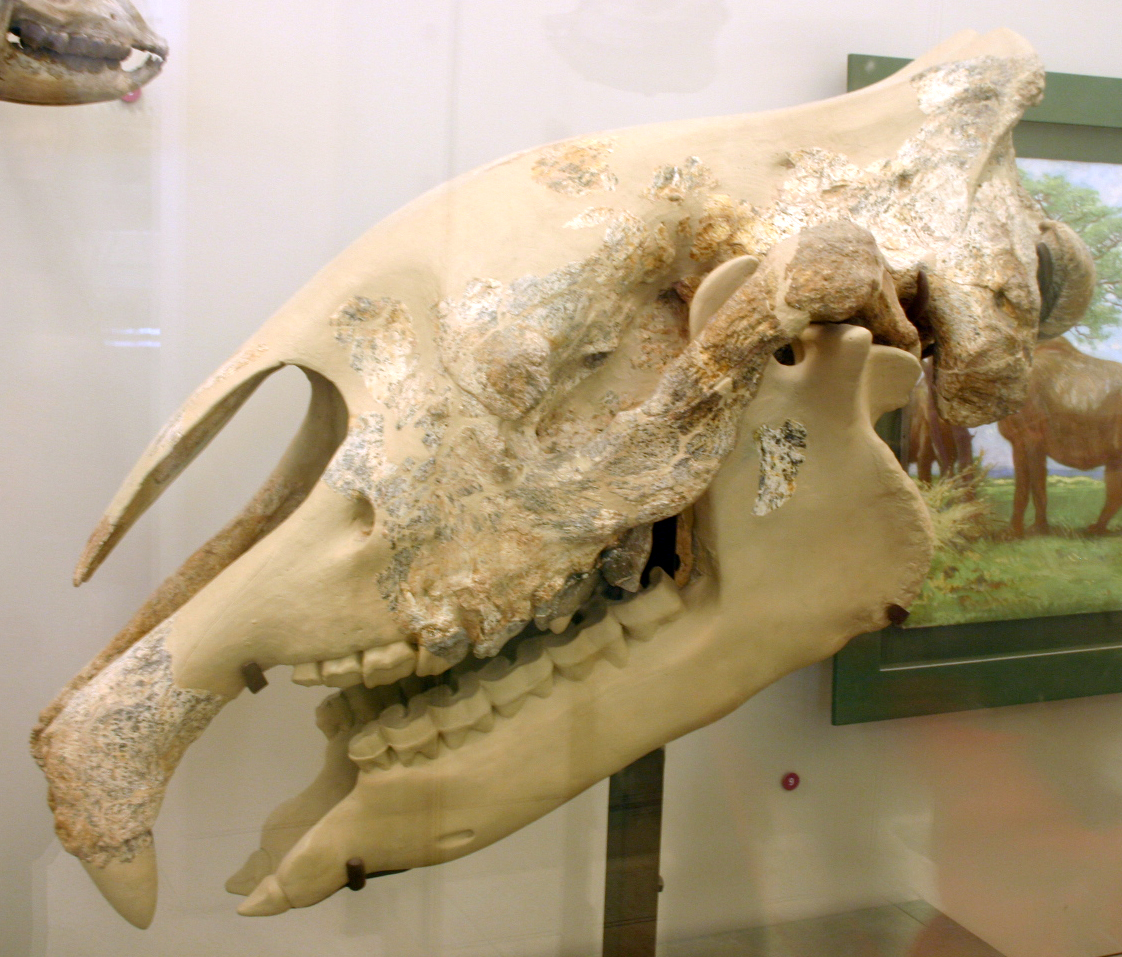
- Type: Geological formation

Lithology
- Primary: Mudstone, sandstone
- Other: Claystone

Location
- Coordinates: 45.3°N 101.1°E
- Region: Asia
- Country: Mongolia
- Extent: Tsagan Nor Basin
- Hsanda Gol Formation (Mongolia)

The Hsanda Gol Formation is a geological formation located in the Tsagan Nor Basin of central Mongolia that dates to the Rupelian age of the Oligocene epoch. It formed in continental desert-like conditions and is notable for its fossil mammals, first excavated by Roy Chapman Andrews and the American Museum of Natural History in the 1920s. Hsanda Gol is included in the Hsandagolian Asian Land Mammal Age, to which it gives its name.

== Geology ==
The 2600 feet thick Hsanda Gol formation is covered in various places by Miocene-age variegated clays, sands, and gravels. It rests on top of the Early Cretaceous Hühteeg Svita formation. The lower portions of the formation are composed of yellow conglomerate, with the higher areas being dominated by red clays, silts and sands, as well as lava and basalt flows.

Hsanda Gol was traditionally assigned to the Middle Oligocene, but after the reassignation of the preceding Ergilian age to the Late Eocene it has now been rendered early Oligocene. It is followed after a faunal hiatus by the overlaying Loh Formation which extends from the Late Oligocene into the Miocene and also contains fossil mammals. Paleomagnetism in underlying and overlaying lava flows establish the beginning of the formation at the end of the magnetic Chron C13n 33.4 million years ago, and its end at the Chron C12n, 31 million years ago.

The Hsanda Gol levels rest directly over, and are continuous with the earlier Houldjin Gravels which are sometimes counted as part of the formation, but were rather deposited during the latest Eocene under wetter and more energetic conditions. In general, the Houldjin Gravels and the Hsanda Gol formation show a transition from more humid, forested conditions to an arid climate with presence of dunes and ephemeral rivers. Some taxa lived through this change including hyaenodonts and indricotheres, but others, such as brontotheres, amynodonts, rhinocerotids and entelodonts went extinct and are as a result absent from Hsanda Gol proper. The following Loh Formation, on the other hand, represents a return to more benign conditions as indicated by the reappearance of rhinocerotids and the entry of the first chalicotheres.

== Paleobiota ==
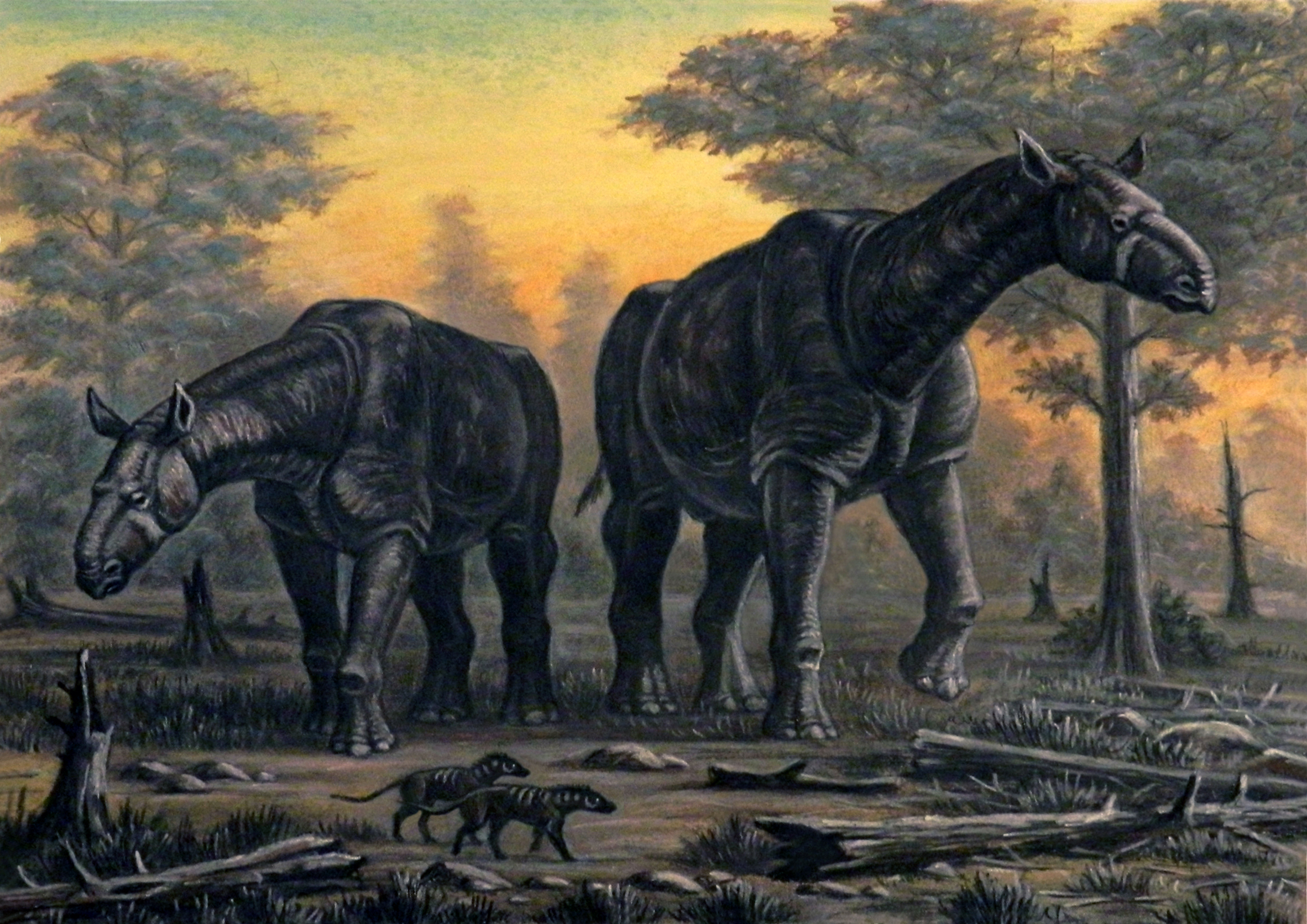
The life restoration of Paraceratherium and Hyaenodon discovered in Hsanda Gol Formation.

Hsanda Gol's paleobiota resembles current desert mammal faunas, including the one found in the same area today. It is composed largely of rodents and lagomorphs with high-crowned teeth adapted to chew hard vegetation; several of these species are fossorial and none arboreal, indicating that there were no areas with high tree density. The only large browsing ungulate, Paraceratherium, was probably transient and there were no medium-large herbivores. Predators were diverse but generally small, with the largest (Hyaenodon) being wolf-sized, and were adapted to hunt by ambush. Landscape would appear as a sparse plain with few tall trees near rivers or where groundwater could be found otherwise. Pallinology studies in contemporary sites of China and Mongolia are consistent with an arid-adapted woody scrubland dominated by Mormon tea and salt-tolerant nitre bush. The few trees were broad-leaved and deciduous, related to modern elm, birch, and oak.

=== Amphibians ===
Amphibians of the Hsanda Gol Formation
Genus	Species	Location	Stratigraphic Position	Notes
Macropelobates	M. osborni			A frog.

=== Reptiles ===
Reptiles of the Hsanda Gol Formation
Genus	Species	Location	Stratigraphic Position	Notes
Crythiosaurus	C. mongoliensis			An amphisbaenid.

=== Mammals ===
==== Didymoconids ====
Didymoconids of the Hsanda Gol Formation
Genus	Species	Location	Stratigraphic Position	Notes	Images
Didymoconus	D. berkeyi	West Tatal Gol; Loh; Tatal Gol; Field 538		A didymoconid. D. berkeyi is the only species present west of Tatal Gol, and D. colgatei is the only present at Field 538. They appear together in the others locations. Though not believed to have modern descendants or ecological equivalents, they present an enlargement of the mastoid region convergent with kangaroo rats and sengis found in semi-arid areas.	
Didymoconus	D. colgatei	West Tatal Gol; Loh; Tatal Gol; Field 538		A didymoconid. D. berkeyi is the only species present west of Tatal Gol, and D. colgatei is the only present at Field 538. They appear together in the others locations. Though not believed to have modern descendants or ecological equivalents, they present an enlargement of the mastoid region convergent with kangaroo rats and sengis found in semi-arid areas.	

==== Erinaceids ====
Erinaceids of the Hsanda Gol Formation
Genus	Species	Location	Stratigraphic Position	Notes
Amphechinus	A. rectus	Loh		An erinaceid (hedgehog relative), ecologically similar to the modern long-eared hedgehog.
Exallerix	E. hsandagolensis	Tatal Gol(?)		An erinaceid (hedgehog relative), without modern ecological equivalent.
Palaeoscaptor	P. acridens	Northeast Kholobolchi Nor; Loh; Field 538		An erinaceid (hedgehog relative), also similar to the long-eared hedgehog.
Tupaiodon	T. morrisi ?T. minutus	Loh (both)		An erinaceid (hedgehog relative), similar to the bicolored shrew.

==== Rodents ====
Rodents of the Hsanda Gol Formation
Genus	Species	Location	Stratigraphic Position	Notes
Cricetops	C. dormitor dormitor C. d. elephantus	SW Loh; East Loh; NE Kholobolchi Nor; Loh; Tatal Gol; Field 538		A cricetid similar to a gerbil or vole. Both subspecies appear together except northeast from Kholobolchi Nor, where only C. d. dormitor is present. Most common mammal, accounting for around one third of all jaws and teeth in the formation.
Cyclomylus	C. lohensis	Loh; Tatal Gol; Field 538		A fossorial cylindrodontid anatomically similar to a mole-rat, but ecologically closer to the Tarbagan marmot. Synonymous with Pseudotsaganomys.
Eumys	E. asiaticus	East Loh; Loh; Tatal Gol; Field 538		A cricetid ecologically similar to a wild house mouse.
Karakoromys	K. decessus	SW Loh; Loh; Tatal Gol		A gundi ecologically similar to Kozlov's pygmy jerboa.
Leptotataromys?	Indeterminate	Loh; Tatal Gol		A gundi possibly synonymous with Karakoromys.
Plesispermophilus?	P.? lohiculus	Tatal Gol		A sciuromorph related to Paramys.
cf. Prosciurus	Indeterminate	Tatal Gol		A relative of Plesispermophilus.
Pseudocylindrodon	Indeterminate	Tatal Gol		A cylindrodontid.
Selenomys	S. mimicus	SW Loh; East Loh; Loh; Tatal Gol		A fossorial relative of the mountain beaver. Possibly ecologically equivalent to the jerboas of the genus Allactaga.
Tataromys	T. deflexus T. plicidens T. sigmodon	West Tatal Gold; NE Kholobolchi Nor; Loh; Tatal Gol; Field 538		Gundis. T. sigmodon appears only at Loh, and T. deflexus only at and west of Tatal Gol.
Tachyoryctoides	T. obrutschewi T. pachygnathus	West Tatal Gol (both)		Synonym of Aralomys. A fossorial relative of bamboo rats.
Tsaganomys	T. altaicus	West Tatal Gol; East Loh; NE Kholobolchi Nor; Loh; Tatal Gol; Field 538		A fossorial cylindrodontid similar to a mole-rat and possibly indicative of sandy areas. Most abundant genus after Cricetops.

==== Lagomorphs ====
Lagomorphs of the Hsanda Gol Formation
Genus	Species	Location	Stratigraphic Position	Notes
Desmatolagus	D. gobiensis	SW Loh; East Loh; NE Kholobolchi Nor; Loh; Tatal Gol; Field 538		Early ochotonids (pikas). "D." robustus may belong to a different genus. SW Loh only contains D. gobiensis; NE Kholobolchi Nor only "D." robustus. D. gobiensis may be ecologically similar to Pallas's pika and "D." robustus to the desert hare.
Desmatolagus	"D." robustus	SW Loh; East Loh; NE Kholobolchi Nor; Loh; Tatal Gol; Field 538		Early ochotonids (pikas). "D." robustus may belong to a different genus. SW Loh only contains D. gobiensis; NE Kholobolchi Nor only "D." robustus. D. gobiensis may be ecologically similar to Pallas's pika and "D." robustus to the desert hare.
Gobiolagus?	G.? teilhardi	Tatal Gol		A leporid (rabbit)
Ochotonolagus	O. argyropuloi	Tatal Gol		An early ochotonid (pika) similar to the Daurian pika.
Procaprolagus	P. maximus	Tatal Gol (all)		Leporids (rabbits)
Procaprolagus	P. mongolicus	Tatal Gol (all)		Leporids (rabbits)
Procaprolagus	P. orlovi	Tatal Gol (all)		Leporids (rabbits)
Procaprolagus	P. vetustus	Tatal Gol (all)		Leporids (rabbits)
Procaprolagus	P. youngi	Tatal Gol (all)		Leporids (rabbits)
Sinolagomys	S. tatalgolicus	Tatal Gol		An early ochotonid (pika)

==== Carnivorans ====
Carnivorans of the Hsanda Gol Formation
Genus	Species	Location	Stratigraphic Position	Notes	Images
Amphicticeps	A. shackelfordi	SW Loh; Loh		An amphicynodontid (early bear)	
Amphicynodon	A. teilhardi	Loh		A small amphicynodontid (early bear) similar to a mustelid.	
Asiavorator	A. gracilis	SW Loh		A feliform.	
Cynodictis?	C.? elegans C.? constans	Loh		A small amphicyonid (bear dog) comparable to a red fox.	
Nimravus	Indeterminate	Tatal Gol		A small nimravid ("false sabertooth"). There are at least two different species represented, both unnamed: a smaller one similar to a wildcat and a larger one resembling a Eurasian lynx.	
Palaeogale	P. ulyesses P. parvula	East Loh; Loh; Tatal Gol; Field 538		Small carnivorans, possibly feliforms, with a mustelid-like anatomy comparable to the marbled polecat and the least weasel.	
Cf. Plesictis	Indeterminate	Tatal Gol		A larger mustelid comparable to a wolverine.	
Proailurus	Indeterminate	Tatal Gol		An early felid better known from Europe and North America. Some authors have instead assigned this material to the nimravid Eofelis or the more advanced felid Pseudaelurus, based on dental features. One lower jaw fragment is known from this formation.	

==== Perissodactyls ====
Perissodactyls of the Hsanda Gol Formation
Genus	Species	Location	Stratigraphic Position	Notes	Images
Paraceratherium	P. transouralicum	SW Loh; Loh; Tatal Gol		A giant browsing rhinoceros of the family Paraceratheriidae, originally described as Indricotherium grangeri, and one of the largest land mammals of all time. Despite its massive size (up to 6 meters tall), it could have occupied a niche similar to the Bactrian camel at Hsanda Gol.	

==== Artiodactyls ====
Artiodactyls of the Hsanda Gol Formation
Genus	Species	Location	Stratigraphic Position	Notes	Image
Eumeryx	E. culminis	SW Loh; East Loh; Loh; Tatal Gol; Field 538		A gelocid pecoran related to the chevrotain, but ecologically comparable to the goitered gazelle.	
Cf. Miomeryx	Indeterminate			A gelocid.	
Palaeohypsodontus	P. asiaticus	Tatal Gol		A hypsodont bovid possibly indicative of the presence of grass.	
Pseudomeryx	P. gobiensis	Tatal Gol		A gelocid.	

==== Creodonts ====
Creodonts of the Hsanda Gol Formation
Genus	Species	Location	Stratigraphic Position	Notes	Images
Hyaenodon	H. ambiguus	West Tatal Gol; SW Loh; NE Kholobolchi Nor; Loh; Tatal Gol; Field 538		The largest carnivore in the formation, a predatory hyaenodont similar to a grey wolf that lived in many different Holarctic environments. H. pervagus is the only species found outside of Tatal Gol.	Restoration of H. gigas, the largest species of Hyaenodon
Hyaenodon	H. aymardi	West Tatal Gol; SW Loh; NE Kholobolchi Nor; Loh; Tatal Gol; Field 538		The largest carnivore in the formation, a predatory hyaenodont similar to a grey wolf that lived in many different Holarctic environments. H. pervagus is the only species found outside of Tatal Gol.	Restoration of H. gigas, the largest species of Hyaenodon
Hyaenodon	H. compressus	West Tatal Gol; SW Loh; NE Kholobolchi Nor; Loh; Tatal Gol; Field 538		The largest carnivore in the formation, a predatory hyaenodont similar to a grey wolf that lived in many different Holarctic environments. H. pervagus is the only species found outside of Tatal Gol.	Restoration of H. gigas, the largest species of Hyaenodon
Hyaenodon	H. gigas	West Tatal Gol; SW Loh; NE Kholobolchi Nor; Loh; Tatal Gol; Field 538		The largest carnivore in the formation, a predatory hyaenodont similar to a grey wolf that lived in many different Holarctic environments. H. pervagus is the only species found outside of Tatal Gol.	Restoration of H. gigas, the largest species of Hyaenodon
Hyaenodon	H. pervagus	West Tatal Gol; SW Loh; NE Kholobolchi Nor; Loh; Tatal Gol; Field 538		The largest carnivore in the formation, a predatory hyaenodont similar to a grey wolf that lived in many different Holarctic environments. H. pervagus is the only species found outside of Tatal Gol.	Restoration of H. gigas, the largest species of Hyaenodon
