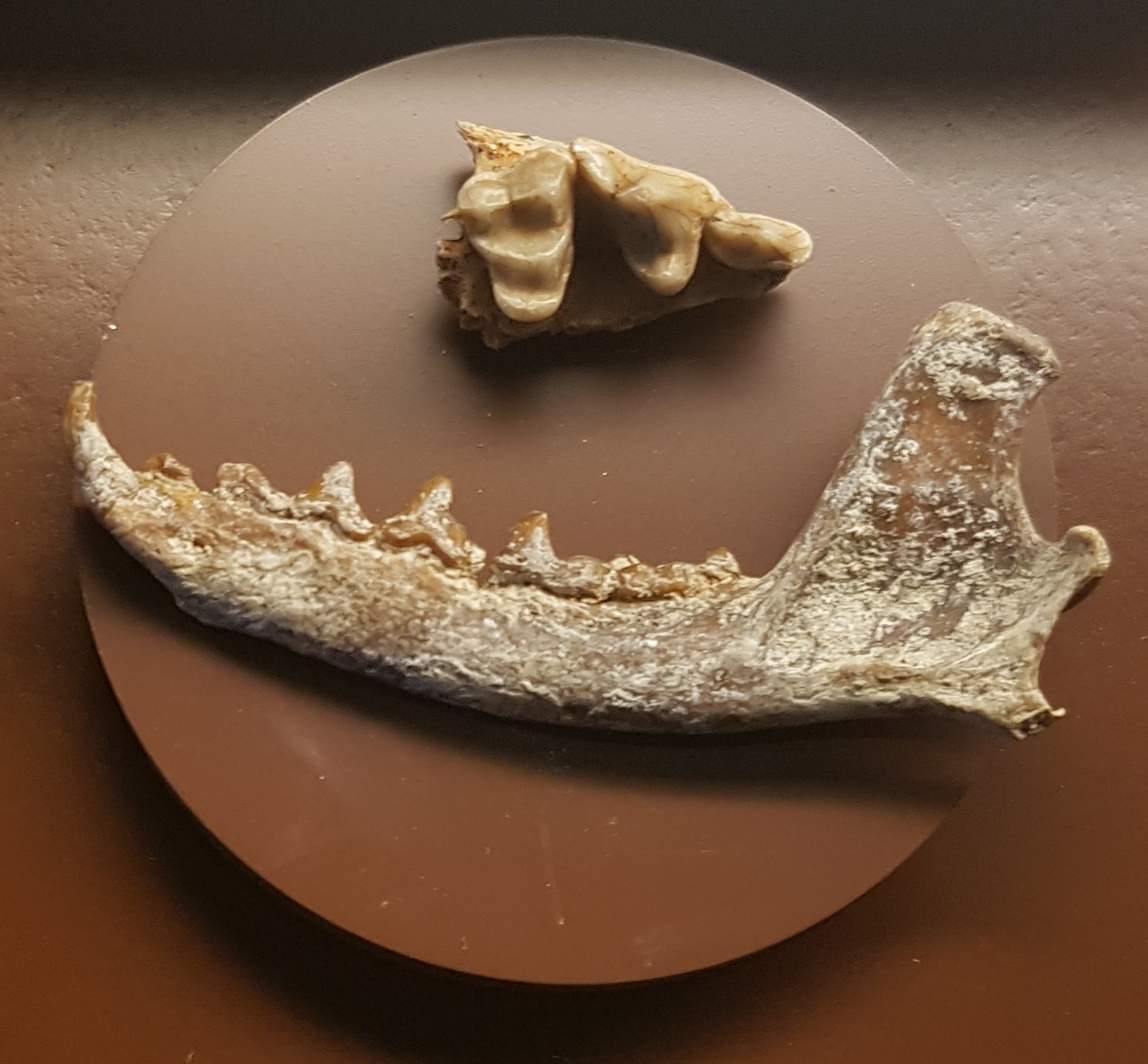
- The mandible and teeth of Pachycynodon from Quercy, France

Scientific classification
- Kingdom: Animalia
- Phylum: Chordata
- Class: Mammalia
- Order: Carnivora
- Family: †Amphicynodontidae
- Genus: †Pachycynodon; Schlosser, 1887

Species
- See text

= Pachycynodon =

Extinct genus of arctoid

Pachycynodon is an extinct genus of arctoid belonging to the family Amphicynodontidae. It lived in Europe during the late Oligocene epoch. They were relatively small carnivores. They have deep mandibles that are robust, even more robust than that of genus Amphicynodon. Their muzzle is elongated.

== Taxonomy ==
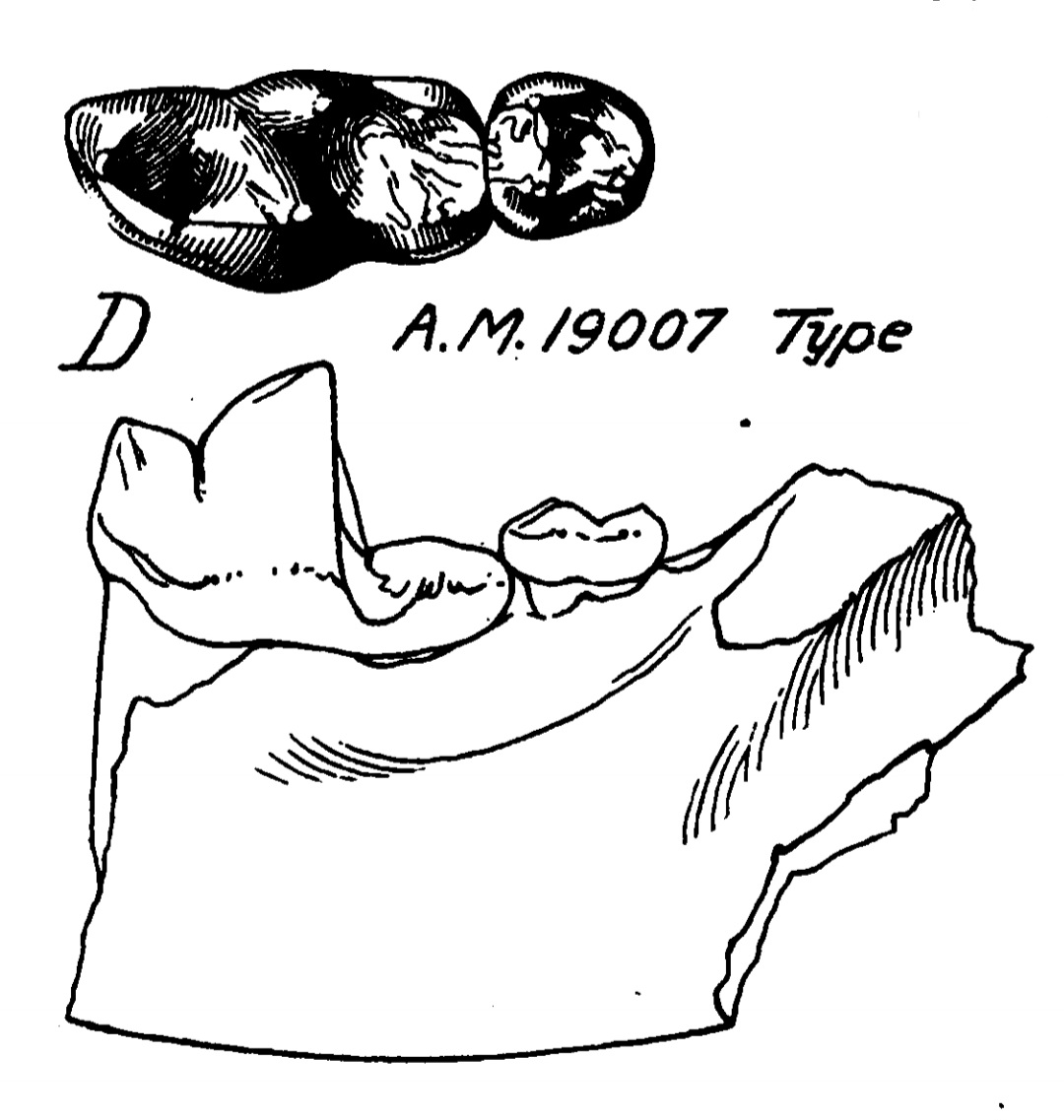
From the Hsanda Gol Formation, it was originally labelled as Cynodon (Pachycynodon) teilhardi

The genus is part of an extinct family of arctoids known as Amphicynodontidae. Genus Pachycyanodon contains several possible species and subspecies with the type species being Pachycynodon crassirostris. A list of species is found below and further info about some of them are found below that:

- Pachycynodon crassirostris (Schlosser, 1888)
- Pachycynodon boriei (Filhol, 1876)
- Pachycynodon delicatus (Schlosser)
- Pachycynodon filholi (Schlosser, 1888)
- Pachycynodon harlowi (-)
- Pachycynodon vulpinus (Schlosser, 1899)
- Pachycynodon tenuis (Teilhard, 1915)
- Pachycynodon aff. tenuis (Teilhard, 1915)
- Pachycynodon tenuis 'amphictoïde' (Teilhard, 1915)
- Pachycynodon filholi var. amphictina (Teilhard, 1915)

=== Pachycynodon crassirostris ===
The type species of this genus, it was described by Schlosser in 1888 through a single isolated fourth metacarpal bone. It was found in the Quercy phosphorites but from an unknown locality.

=== Pachycynodon boriei ===
It was a large species, possibly one of the largest carnivoran from the Quercy phosphorites. Filhol described this species in 1876.

=== Pachycynodon delicatus ===
The holotype of this species was uncovered in South Dakota in Porcupine creek in the lower Rosebud beds. The holotype specimen is a small lower jaw that is nearly identical to Pachycynodon tenuis only differing with the teeth of P. delicatus belong slightly longer. Pachycynodon harlowi is also nearly identical to both differing in the M2 and M3 molars being larger and a slightly shorter series of premolars.

=== Pachycynodon dubius ===
It was described in the year 1882 by Filhol. The species name "dubius" is from Filhol doubting that it belonged in genus Cynodictis based on its grouped trigonid of M1.

=== Pachycynodon filholi ===
It was also described by Schlosser in the year 1888 however there was no biostratigraphic locality given.

=== Pachycynodon tenuis ===
It was described in the year 1915 by Teilhard. It is considered by Teilhard to be a model for the origin of this genus due to its small size.
