= Ursida =

Taxonomic group of carnivorans within Arctoidea

Ursida (vernacular name: ursidans) is a taxon (usually parvorder) within Arctoidea in some systems. It is usually meant as the opposite of the taxon Mustelida (or as the opposite of the taxa Mustelida and Amphicyonidae) within Arctoidea.

The taxon Ursida was created in 1976.

== Composition ==
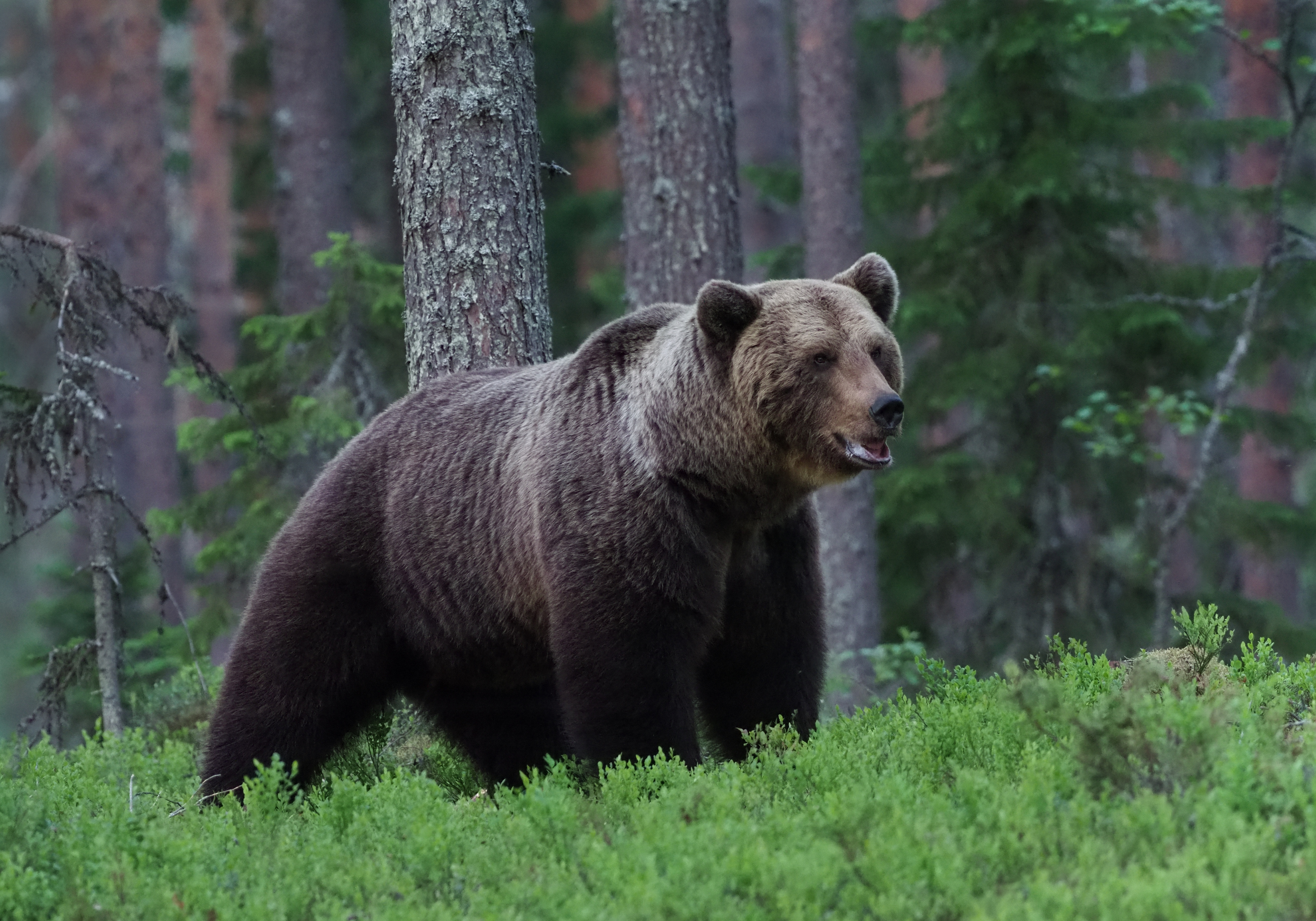
Brown bear.

In current phylogenetic trees, Ursida being the opposite of Mustelida usually implies that Ursida comprises only Ursidae sensu stricto (including Hemicyonidae) and possibly also Amphicynodontidae and Subparictidae. The taxon Ursida delimited this way is alternatively called superfamily Ursoidea sensu stricto or family Ursidae sensu lato. See Ursoidea for further details on the composition of Ursida (= Ursoidea) in current systems.

In systems based on somewhat older phylogenetic trees (1976 to early 2000s), Ursida being the opposite of Mustelida implies that Ursida comprises at least Ursidae sensu stricto (including Hemicyonidae), but often also Amphicyonidae, sometimes also Pinnipedia (or at least Pinnipedia except Phocidae), sometimes also Amphicynodontidae and Subparictidae, and rarely also Ailuridae. The taxon Ursida delimited this way is sometimes also called superfamily Ursoidea sensu lato, although, more frequently, Ursoidea (i. e. Ursoidea sensu stricto) is only one of the superfamilies within Ursida delimited this way and it includes only Ursidae sensu stricto (including Hemicyonidae) and sometimes also Amphicyonidae.

Alternatively, the parvorder Ursida can be conceived not as the opposite of Mustelida within Arctoidea, but as the opposite of Amphicyonidae within Arctoidea. In such an arrangement, the parvorder Ursida also includes the Musteloidea, i.e. more specifically, Ursida is composed of the superfamily Ursoidea sensu lato (i. e. Ursidae sensu stricto, Amphicynodontidae, Subparictidae and Pinnipedia) and the superfamily Musteloidea.
