= Allocyon =

Scientific classification
- Kingdom: Animalia
- Phylum: Chordata
- Class: Mammalia
- Order: Carnivora
- Family: †Amphicynodontidae
- Genus: †Allocyon; Merriam, 1930
- Species: †A. loganensis

Binomial name
- †Allocyon loganensis Merriam, 1930

Extinct arctoid genus

Allocyon is an extinct genus of arctoid that belongs to the family Amphicynodontidae. It lived in Oregon around 33-30 million years ago during the Oligocene epoch.

This genus only contains one species, that being Allocyon loganensis.
