= Ergilictis =

Ergilictis Temporal range: Late Eocene–Early Oligocene

Scientific classification
- Domain: Eukaryota
- Kingdom: Animalia
- Phylum: Chordata
- Class: Mammalia
- Family: †Didymoconidae
- Subfamily: †Didymoconinae
- Genus: †Ergilictis; Lopatin, 1997

Type species
- †Ergilictis reshetovi Lopatin, 1997

Extinct genus of mammal

Ergilictis (meaning "Ergilin Dzo polecat") is an extinct genus of mammal that lived during the late Eocene and early Oligocene epochs. It was endemic to Asia, and its fossils have been found in the Ergilin Dzo and Hsanda Gol formations of Mongolia. It belongs to the family Didymoconidae, which has uncertain taxonomic affinities.

== Discovery and naming ==
The fossils of Ergilictis were first collected during a joint Soviet–Mongolian paleontological expedition in the 1980s, and the genus was erected in 1997 to contain the single species E. reshetovi. The holotype, a fragment of the right mandibular ramus (PIN 3109/247), was found in the lower unit of the Eocene-aged Ergilin Dzo Formation of Mongolia. The generic name is derived from the name of the Ergilin Dzo Formation and the Greek word ictis (meaning "polecat"). The specific name honors paleontologist V. Yu Reshetov.

In addition to the holotype, an isolated right premolar attributed to cf. Ergilictis sp. has been collected from the Oligocene-aged Hsanda Gol Formation.
