= Huntictis =

Huntictis Temporal range: Early Oligocene

Scientific classification
- Kingdom: Animalia
- Phylum: Chordata
- Class: Mammalia
- Order: Carnivora
- Genus: †Huntictis
- Species: †H. minima

Binomial name
- †Huntictis minima De Bonis et al., 2025

Extinct genus of musteloid caniform

Huntictis is an extinct monotypic genus of musteloid caniform that lived in France during the Rupelian stage of the Oligocene epoch.

== Etymology ==
The generic name Huntictis derives from the name of R. M. Hunt Jr., honouring him for his work on the carnivorans of the Quercy Phosphorites Formation, and the Greek word ictis, meaning weasel. The specific epithet of the type species, Huntictis minima, means "very small" in Latin, referencing the animal's diminuitive size.
