= Amphicynodontidae =

Amphicynodontidae Temporal range: Early Oligocene to Early Miocene 33.9–20 Ma
- Artist's restoration of Kolponomos newportensis.

Scientific classification
- Kingdom: Animalia
- Phylum: Chordata
- Class: Mammalia
- Order: Carnivora
- Infraorder: Arctoidea
- Family: †Amphicynodontidae; Simpson, 1945

Genera
- †Allocyon; †Amphicticeps; †Amphicynodon; †Drassonax; †Kolponomos; †Pachycynodon; †Wangictis

Extinct clade of mammals

Amphicynodontidae is a likely non-monophyletic family of extinct arctoid mammals whose phylogenetic relationships remain uncertain. Its members have variously been interpreted as closely related to bears, pinnipeds, or both. They are primarily known from cranial and dental remains, although Amphicynodon is represented by extensive postcranial material. The group was recognized by Max Schlosser in 1911 as the subfamily Cynodontinae, which he considered ancestral to Ursidae. Since then, an ursid affinity has been commonly suggested, though many alternative placements have been proposed. Kolponomos, an enigmatic Miocene carnivoran with possible affinities to pinnipeds, has frequently been included among the amphicynodontids. Some authors have interpreted amphicynodontids as ancestral to pinnipeds or as stem taxa of a clade uniting bears and pinnipeds. However, this conclusion is based in part on a presumed close relation between ursids and pinnipeds, inferred from morphology, that is generally not supported by genetic evidence. Amphicynodontids likely represent a collection of generalized, early-diverging arctoid lineages, potentially including stem taxa of Arctoidea, Ursidae, Pinnipedia, or Musteloidea.

== Description ==
Amphicynodontids were relatively small arctoid carnivorans. Their skulls were somewhat elongate, with moderately developed sagittal and lambdoid crests.The auditory bullae were unpartitioned and formed mainly by the ectotympanic bone, representing the ancestral condition in arctoids. They possessed small incisors, moderately developed canines, and relatively simple premolars, with the exception of the fourth premolar, which was more robust and bore a well-developed protocone. Most had two upper molars and three lower molars, though some specimens bear three upper or two lower. The first lower molar was most robust, with a well-developed crushing surface, while the third, when present, was small and rounded. Dental morphology suggests they differed in dietary specialization, suggesting a less specialized diet in Amphicynodon, adaptations towards hypercarnivory in Amphicticeps, and durophagy in Kolponomos.

As most Amphicynodontids lack described postcranial remains, inferences about their locomotion and broader palaeoecology remain limited. An important exception is Amphicynodon, which is known from hundreds of specimens from the Quercy Phosphorites of France. It had features indicative of an agile, arboreal lifestyle, including high joint mobility, grasping forelimbs, and powerful musculature. In contrast to Amphicynodon, Kolponomos was a robust animal associated with marine environments, likely ecologically comparable to sea otters. However, its known postcranial remains are highly fragmentary, consisting only of vertebrae and elements of the foot, limiting inferences about its overall body form and lifestyle. The skull and neck vertebrae indicate the presence of well-developed muscles, likely used to dislodge hard-shelled invertebrates. The foot bones were flattened, as in pinnipeds, but had proportions and joint structures more similar to those of terrestrial carnivorans. These bones also possessed well-developed tendon attachment points, suggesting powerful movement of the digits. Given the known variation among Amphicynodontids, as well as their uncertain and likely non-monophyletic composition, it is difficult to infer the ecological preferences of less studied members.

== Distribution ==
Taxa attributed to Amphicynodontidae are known from Europe, Asia, and North America, indicating a broadly Holarctic distribution. The family is particularly well represented in the early Oligocene of Europe, where amphicynodontids appeared following the Grande Coupure. The most species-rich and geographically widespread genus is Amphicynodon, which is represented by numerous European species, as well as the Asian A. teilhardi and the morphologically disparate North American A. major. However, Amphicynodon itself may also be paraphyletic with respect to other arctoid taxa, and A. major is alternatively identified as Parictis major. Parictis, traditionally considered an amphicynodontid, is now generally placed in a separate family, Subparictidae, along with several other North American stem-bears. Another North American genus, Drassonax, is particularly similar to European amphicynodontids, potentially indicating that this lineage dispersed into or out of North America independently of subparictids. The group's temporal range may extend beyond the Oligocene if Kolponomos is included within Amphicynodontidae, as it is the only proposed member known to have survived into the Miocene.

== History of classification ==
In 1911, Schlosser established the subfamily Cynodontinae to encompass the genera Cynodon, Paracynodon, and Pachycynodon, as well as Hemicyon, Cephalogale, and Dinocyon, the latter three now regarded as hemicyonine bears. He placed the subfamily within Canidae, while also considering it ancestral to Ursidae. However, Cynodon was a junior homonym of a genus of dogtooth characins, prompting its replacement with Amphicynodon and the corresponding renaming of the subfamily as Amphicynodontinae in Simpson's 1945 monograph on mammal classification. Paracynodon was identified as a junior synonym of Amphicynodon, while Parictis, Plesiocyon, Allocyon, and Amphicticeps were added to the subfamily. Simpson acknowledged the hemicyonines, which Frick had recognized as a distinct morphological group in 1926, but retained them within Amphicynodontinae, which he continued to classify as a subfamily of Canidae. Theodore E. White rejected this placement of the amphicynodontines, arguing that their auditory region and known postcranial remains more closely resembled those of ursids than canids. He also included an additional genus, Daphoenocyon.

Although Simpson and Schlosser inferred a close relationship between bears and canids, these groups had historically been assigned to separate lineages based on the degree of division of their auditory bullae, or middle ear cavities. Canids were recognized as possessing partially divided bullae, whereas ursids, procyonids, and mustelids share the undivided "arctoid" condition. Pinnipeds were recognized as similar to the arctoids, but were not yet formally included. In the latter half of the 20th century, this classification scheme gained renewed prominence through further morphological analyses and eventually genetic evidence, with ursids, pinnipeds, and musteloids together forming the Arctoidea. The separation of amphicynodontines from canids was therefore consistent with broader developments in carnivoran classification.

=== Possible affinity to pinnipeds ===
Morphological analyses of arctoid carnivorans have historically recovered an ursid–pinniped clade known as Ursida. Within this presumed clade, Richard Tedford noted morphological similarities between the amphicynodontines and Enaliarctos, a stem-pinniped then regarded as an otarioid. He further developed this interpretation in his 1994 description of Kolponomos newportensis, a marine-associated carnivoran considered to have affinities with pinnipeds. In this work, Amphicynodontidae was explicitly defined as a paraphyletic family sister to Ursidae, comprising only Amphicynodon, Pachycynodon, Allocyon, and Kolponomos, with each genus representing a successive step towards pinnipeds. The 1997 mammal classification system of McKenna and Bell subsequently placed amphicynodontids within the superfamily Phocoidea, which they defined to encompass all pinnipeds. Other authorities rejected this placement, instead regarding Amphicynodontinae as a subfamily wholly within Ursidae.

Which, if any, amphicynodontid genera are closely related to pinnipeds remains uncertain. For instance, in 2005, Wang and colleagues recovered Amphicynodon and Amphicticeps as separate lineages branching prior to the divergence of ursids and pinnipeds. They continued to regard Allocyon and Pachycynodon as probable stem-pinnipeds, although no pinnipeds were included in their phylogenetic analysis. A similar result was obtained by Finarelli in 2008 through a combined morphological and genetic phylogenetic analysis, which recovered Amphicticeps as a stem-arctoid and Amphicynodon as an ursid, while the presumed mustelid Plesictis was instead recovered as a stem-pinniped. Conversely, a phylogenetic analysis presented by Wang and colleagues in their description of Eoarctos recovered Amphicynodon, Drassonax, Pachycynodon, and Allocyon within a grade of stem-ursids, while Amphicticeps was the only genus recovered as a stem-pinniped.

Kolponomos has been included in relatively few phylogenetic analyses sampling arctoids more broadly. In 2020, Paterson and colleagues recovered it as a stem-pinniped in a grade with species of Enaliarctos. The same study weakly supported Amphicticeps and Allocyon as stem-pinnipeds under parsimony analysis. However, a 2024 doctoral thesis instead recovered Kolponomos as an ursid, while other amphicynodontids were variously recovered as stem-pinnipeds, stem-ursids, or outside both groups, depending on the tree-search criteria employed. Overall, the phylogenetic affinities of individual amphicynodontid genera, in relation to pinnipeds, ursids, and one another, remain uncertain.

=== Modern understanding ===
Molecular evidence strongly suggests that ursids and pinnipeds are not sister lineages, with pinnipeds instead being more closely related to musteloids. Consequently, Tedford's hypothesis that amphicynodontids were sister to ursids and ancestral to pinnipeds is inconsistent with current understandings of arctoid interrelationships. The morphological features historically used to unite ursids, pinnipeds, and amphicynodontids are now interpreted as ancestral characters of Arctoidea, which were secondarily modified in mustelids. Given the uncertain phylogenetic affinities of individual amphicynodontid genera, recent studies have suggested that Amphicynodontidae represents a diverse assemblage of stem taxa of Arctoidea, Ursidae, Pinnipedia, and possibly Musteloidea.

Amphicynodontidae has long been considered non-monophyletic. As proposed in 1911, the group was considered to represent a lineage ancestral to bears. Tedford later interpreted it as an explicitly paraphyletic grade of stem-pinnipeds. Recent phylogenetic works have consistently failed to recover Amphicynodontidae as a clade. Based on their phylogenetic analysis in the description of Eoarctos, Wang and colleagues state that even a more narrowly defined Amphicynodontidae is paraphyletic, and that there is "no compelling reason to keep the family in circulation." Other authors, despite acknowledging the group's non-monophyletic nature, argue that retaining Amphicynodontidae is preferable to leaving its constituent taxa as "familyless orphans."

== Genera and species ==
The following genera and species are most commonly assigned to the Amphicynodontidae:

- †Allocyon Merriam, 1930
  - †Allocyon loganensis Merriam, 1930 (type species)
- †Amphicynodon Filhol, 1881 (type genus)
  - †Amphicynodon brachyrostris (Filhol, 1876)
  - †Amphicynodon cephalogalinus Teilhard, 1915
  - †Amphicynodon chardini Cirot and De Bonis, 1992
  - †Amphicynodon crassirostris (Filhol, 1876)
  - †Amphicynodon gracilis (Filhol, 1874)
  - †Amphicynodon leptorhynchus (Filhol, 1874)
  - †?Amphicynodon major (Clark & Guensburg, 1972) (questionably assigned; possibly Parictis major)
  - †Amphicynodon mongoliensis Janovskaja, 1970
  - †Amphicynodon teilhardi Matthew and Granger, 1924
  - †Amphicynodon typicus Schlosser, 1888 (originally Plesiocyon typicus)
  - †Amphicynodon velaunus (Aymard, 1846) (type species)
- †Amphicticeps Matthew and Granger, 1924
  - †Amphicticeps dorog Wang et al., 2005
  - †Amphicticeps makhchinus Wang et al., 2005
  - †Amphicticeps shackelfordi Matthew and Granger, 1924 (type species)
- †Drassonax Galbreath, 1953
  - †Drassonax harpagops Galbreath, 1953 (type species)
- †Kolponomos Stirton, 1960
  - †Kolponomos clallamensis Stirton, 1960 (type species)
  - †Kolponomos newportensis Tedford et al., 1994
- †Pachycynodon Schlosser, 1888
  - †Pachycynodon boriei (Filhol, 1876)
  - †Pachycynodon crassirostris Schlosser, 1888 (type species)
  - †Pachycynodon dubius (Filhol, 1882) (including P. vulpinus, originally Paracynodon vulpinus)
  - †Pachycynodon filholi Schlosser, 1888
  - †Pachycynodon tenuis Teilhard de Chardin, 1915
- †Wangictis de Bonis et al., 2019
  - †Wangictis tedfordi (Wang & Qiu, 2003)
