= Otter River =

Otter River may refer to:

== North America ==
- Otter River (Northwest Branch Saint John River tributary), in Quebec, Canada, and Maine, US
- Otter River (Ontario)
- Otter River (Massachusetts)
- Otter River, a village in Templeton, Massachusetts
- Otter River (Michigan)
- Otter River (Minnesota)
- Otter River (Virginia)
- Sweet Grass Creek, or Otter River, in Montana

== United Kingdom ==
- River Otter, Devon, England

== See also ==
- River otter (disambiguation)
- Otto River, in New Zealand's South Island
