= Eumeryx =

Eumeryx Temporal range: Eocene-Oligocene 37.2–23.0 Ma

Scientific classification
- Kingdom: Animalia
- Phylum: Chordata
- Class: Mammalia
- Order: Artiodactyla
- Infraorder: Pecora
- Genus: Eumeryx; Matthew and Granger, 1924

Type species
- †Eumeryx culminis Matthew and Granger, 1924

Other species
- †E. imbellis Vislobokova, 1983

Extinct genus of mammals

Eumeryx is an extinct genus of small pecoran from the Eocene and Oligocene of China and Mongolia. The genus has been historically placed within the family Gelocidae but has also been suggested to be the earliest cervoid by various authors. Similar to other early ruminants, along with some seen today, Eumeryx possessed no head ornamentation but did have sexually dimorphic canine teeth on the upper dentition. Due to the genus being present throughout the Eocene-Oligocene Boundary, it would have lived in a variety of ecosystems. While earlier records of the genus would have lived in more humid environments, later records would have been found in arid deserts and hot steppes. There are currently two valid species being E. culminis and E. imbellis.

== History and classification ==
The type species of Eumeryx, E. culminis, was first described by Matthew and Granger in 1924 based on number of cranial and postcranial specimens from the Hsanda Gol Formation. A second species, E. imbellis, would later be described by Vislobokova in 1983.

The classification of Eumeryx has been argued back and forth since the genus was first described with various authors, including the original describers of the genus, suggesting that it was the earliest known cervid or cervoid. This was later questioned by Simpson in 1945, instead placing it in the now invalid family Blastomerycidae. The most common classification of the genus would be first suggested by Viret in 1961 who placed it in the family Gelocidae. This family, however, has been considered a wastebasket with a number of taxa being moved out of the family and placed in others. Even with this placement being the most common, more evidence towards the cervoid placement would be given in a 1987 publication by Scott and Janis which would bring up certain features of the limb bones along with the presence of a lower molar morphotype referred to as a "Palaeomeryx fold" as evidence. The taxonomic position of Eumeryx is highly contested even today with both of these classifications being used since the 1990's, with some authors also simply calling it a Pecoran. As is the case with a number of taxa, Eumeryx has not been a part of the phylogenic trees of many papers. Even with this being the case, one of the most recent papers with a phylogeny including the genus would be in 2006 by Métais who would place it as a Pecoran; this conclusion also being reached in a 1992 paper by Scott and Janis.

== Description ==
Eumeryx was a small pecoran with some authors suggesting that it was about the size of Blastomeryx advena. Similar to a number of other members in the group, Eumeryx was sexually dimorphic with males processing a pair of large canine teeth. There are 4 premolars present on each part of the dentition with the first being much smaller than the others. The other premolars are generally compressed and two-rooted, in comparison of the single root of the first premolar. The molars of the genus are brachydont with some lower molars assigned to the genus possessing a "Palaeomeryx fold", a type of molar seen in early ruminants. The two species are generally similar in their morphology though the teeth of E. imbellis have higher crowns than E. culminis along with a more developed "Palaeomeryx fold". Along with the dentition, incomplete limb elements of the genus are known. These specimens show that cannon-bones were present, similar to modern ungulates, along with fact that both the fifth metatarsal and metacarpal are coossified. The metatarsal does have a gully with a short bridge similar to what is seen in cervids.

== Paleoenvironment ==
Eumeryx is an artiodactyl found in the Eocene to Oligocene of Asia with the genus being found in both China and Mongolia. One of the earlier records of the genus is found within the Ergilin Dzo Formation, which dates to the late Eocene. Though hot, the environment would have been generally humid with crocodilians being found. During the Oligocene in Mongolia, a trend of cooling and aridification due to the glaciation is seen in the region. Along with this, the uplift of the Hangay Mountains also would have caused the blocking of moisture coming from Siberia which would have also contributed to the aridification seen. During this time, the environment that Eumeryx would have lived in would have been arid with the exact ecosystem being dependent on the region. While some, like the one seen at the Hsanda Gol Formation, would have been most likely hot steppes. Others, like the one represented by the Ulantatal Formation, would have been deserts made up of sand dunes. This is in stark contrast to the more humid conditions in Mongolia seen in both the Eocene and Miocene.
