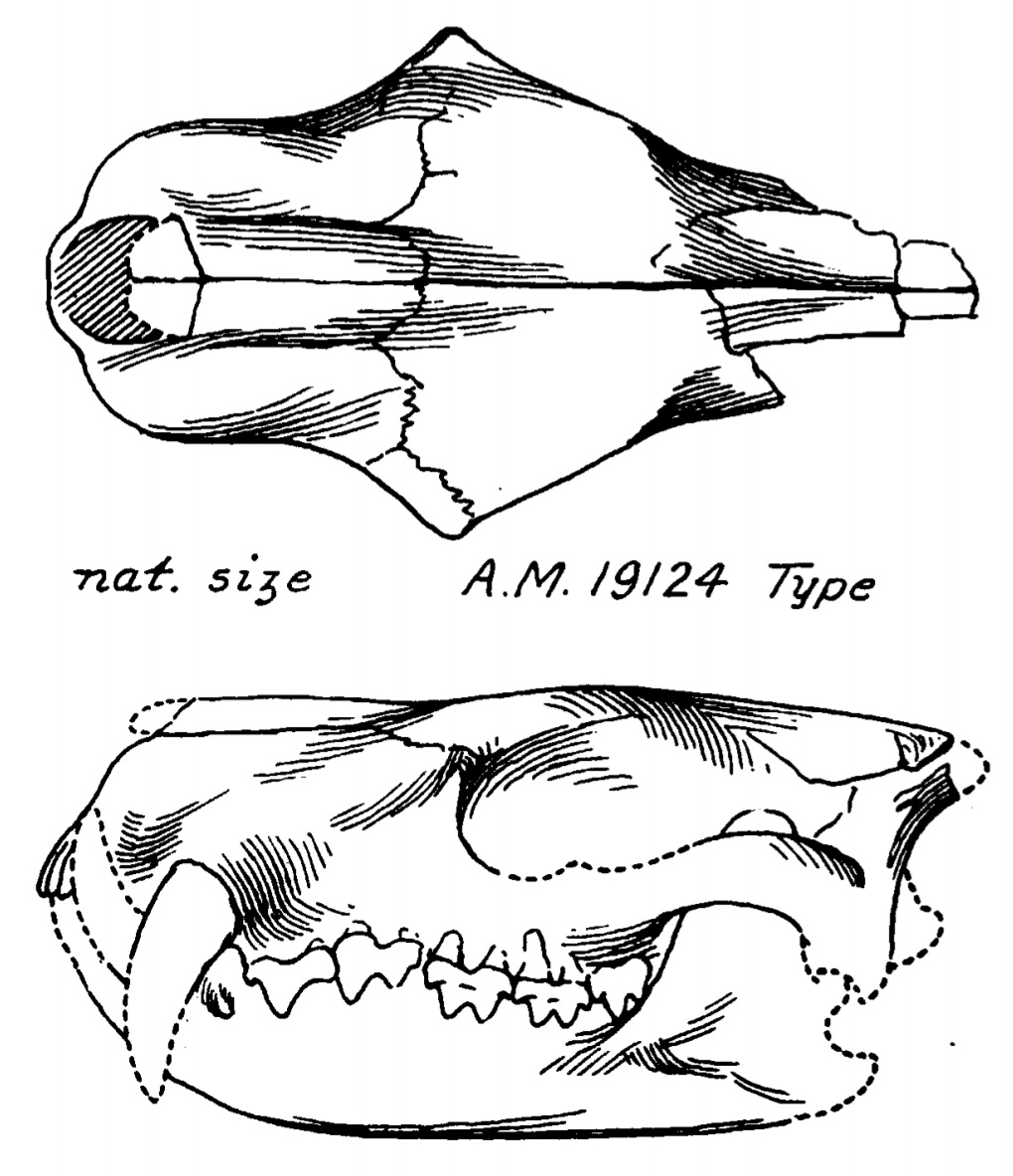
- Skull of Didymoconus

Scientific classification
- Kingdom: Animalia
- Phylum: Chordata
- Class: Mammalia
- Subclass: Theria
- Clade: Eutheria
- Family: †Didymoconidae; Kretzoi, 1943

Genera
- †Erlianoryctes; Ardynictinae; †Archaeoryctes; †Ardynictis; †Jiajianictis; †Wanolestes; †Zeuctherium; Kennatheriinae; †Erlikotherium; †Kennatherium; †Khaichinula; Didymoconinae; †Archaeomangus; †Ergilictis; †Didymoconus; †Tshotgoria

= Didymoconidae =

Didymoconidae Temporal range: Paleocene–Late Oligocene

Extinct family of mammals

Didymoconidae is an extinct family of eutherian mammals of unknown affinities, they ranged from the early Paleocene to late Oligocene and were endemic to Asia. Like a majority of early Cenozoic mammal groups, the exact taxonomic placement of didymoconids is poorly understood but a few groups do consistently come up. The most common suggestion is one that has been brought up since their original description, that being their close relationship to Mesonychidae. Though not agreed upon by a number of authors, this does appear in the most recent phylogeny containing the two groups. Other suggestions of close relatives include Zalambdalestidae, Macroscelidea, Lagomorpha, and the now obsolete order Insectivora.

Members of Didymoconidae are generally considered to be fossorial or burrowing in some way with it differing based on the genus. Some members have been suggested to just dig through the top soil for insects while others are considered to be more specialized burrowers. This comes from a mix of cranial, dental, and postcranial anatomy that lines up with what is seen in other burrowing mammals. One genus, Erlikotherium, has even been suggested to have been exhibit myrmecophagy due to the reduction of incisors. There are currently two monophyletic subfamilies recognized, Didymoconinae and Kennatheriinae with a third subfamily, Ardynictinae, currently considered non-monophyletic.

== History and Classification ==
The type genus of Didymoconidae, Didymoconus, was first described in W. D. Matthew and W. Granger in 1924 based on a fairly complete skull and mandibles; all of these being found within the sediments of the Hsanda Gol Formation. Since this original publication, didymoconids would be occasionally published on with all records of the family being located in Central Asia. Similar to a large amount of other early Cenozoic mammal groups, the exact placement of Didymoconidae within Eutheria has not remained consistent. In their original publication, Matthew and Granger would place it within Carnivora though compare the family to other groups such as Leptictidae and Mesonychidae. Other authors would place the family close to a number of other groups such as Creodonta, Lagomorpha, Hapalodectidae, and Macroscelidea though the suggestions made in the 1924 publication would still be brought up from time to time. One example of this is when authors such as Gingerich and Wang would push towards Didymoconidae having a close relationship with Mesonychidae. Authors would go as far as placing the mesonychid Yantanglestes as the ancestor of Didymoconidae. Another genus, Wyolestes, would also be suggested to be part of the family and would even be placed within its own subfamily, Wyolestinae, during this time but authors such as Meng would argue against the assignment. Men specifically argued against the genus being placed as a member of Didymoconidae due to a lack of shared, more derived features. This would be corroborated not only when more complete material of Wyolestes would be described in 1987 and 1991 but also when a 2025 study by Shawn P. Zack and coauthors would place the genus as a hyeanodont based on both cranial and postcranial material.

A number of features in the cranium also suggested that Didymoconidae could have been closely related to the now obsolete orders Insectivora and Lipotyphla. During the early 1990s and early 2000s, a pair of papers would be published in A. V. Lopatin which would name a total of three subfamilies. Two papers would divide the family into two subfamilies, Ardynictinae and Didymoconinae, one by Tong and another by Lopatin. While Tong would define them just by differences in the fourth premolar and both molars, Lopatin would define them by how each subfamily reached the similar result of an open talonid and cutting hypoconid on the lower fourth premolar. There would also be other differences noted such the presence of hypocones on the upper fourth premolar to second molar in Ardynictinae. A third subfamily, Kennatheriinae, would be named by Lopatin in a 2006 publication based on differences in the dentition along with the shape of the angular and coronoid processes on the mandible. The first and only cladistic analysis of the family would be done by Pieter Missiaen and coauthors in 2016 which would test the relationships within Didymoconidae along with a number of other groups that it has been suggested to be placed near. These groups included Zalambdalestidae, Nyctitheriidae, and Leptictida along with a similar Asian mammal group from the same time, Sarcodontidae. This analysis would show that Ardynictinae was a paraphyletic group of stem didymoconids though would find the other two subfamilies as monophyletic. Below is the cladogram from the 2016 publication.

- - - Prokennalestes
    - - Zalambdalestes
      - - Praolestes
        - - Gypsonictops
          - Leptacodon
        - - Sarcodontidae
            - Sarcodon
            - - Carnilestes
              - Prosarcodon
      - - Didymoconidae
          - - Archaeoryctes
            - Zeuctherium
          - - Wanolestes
            - - Ardynictis
              - Jiajianictis
              - - Kennatheriinae
                  - Erlikotherium
                  - - Kennatherium
                    - Khaichinula
                - Didymoconinae
                  - Ergilictis
                  - - Didymoconus
                    - Archaeomangus
                    - Tshotgoria

The type genus Didymoconus would be included in a cladogram within the 2025 publication by Shawn P. Zack and coauthors and would find it in a number of positions such as being close to Mesonyx and Afrosoricida though both of these results were weakly supported. Even with this being the case, the most parsimonious tree in the publication would place Didymoconus as sister to Mesonyx, agreeing with a number of previous papers that suggested a close relationship between Didymoconidae and Mesonychidae. Though not common, Didymoconidae is sometimes assigned to the order Didymoconidae with it being the only group within it.

== Description ==
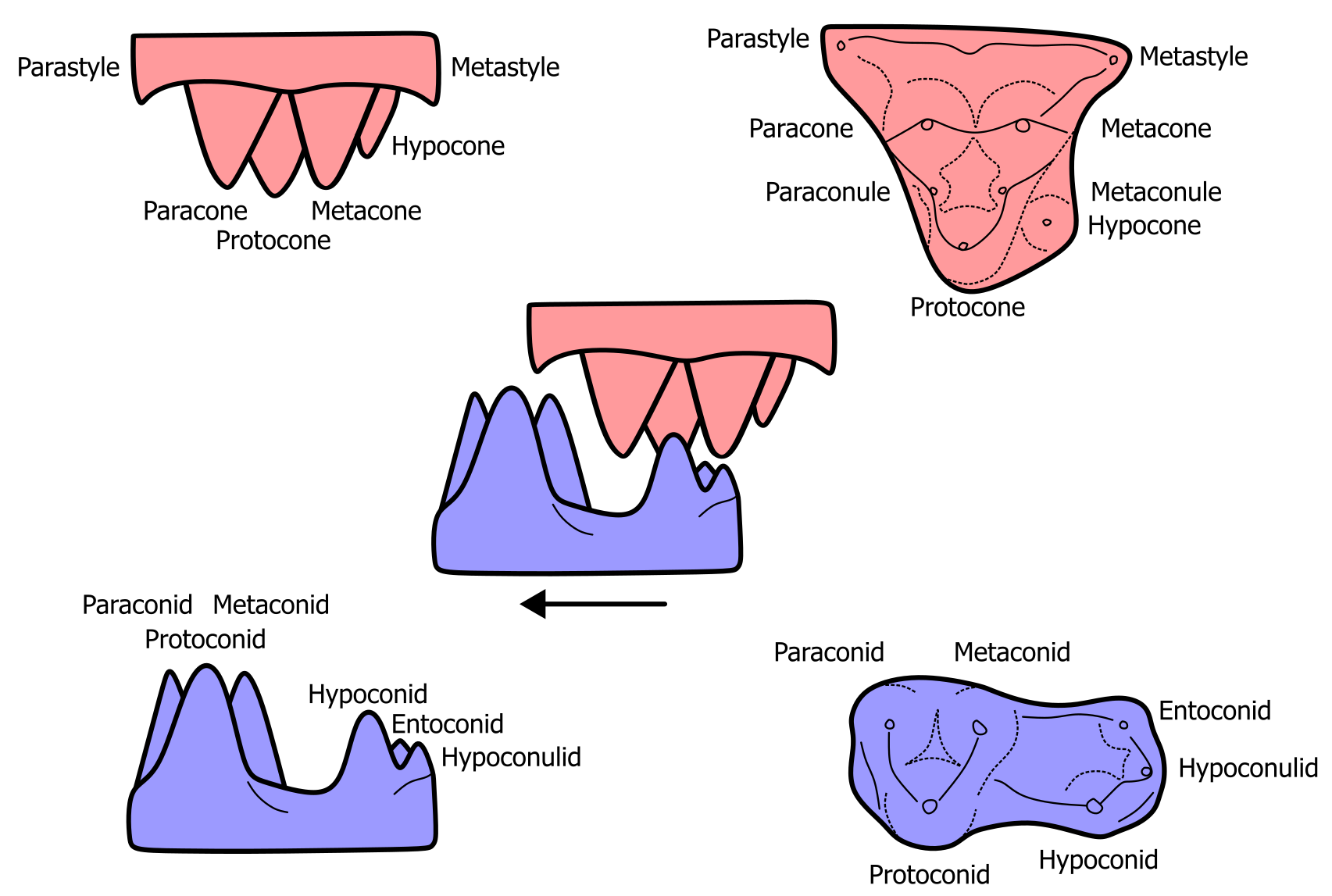
A diagram of tribosphenic molars showing the terminology of certain parts of the tooth

=== Skull ===
Members of Didymoconidae have been generally described as being medium to large 'insectivores' with larger members of the family like Archaeoryctes euryalis having skull lengths of 10 centimetres (3.9 in). The rostrum of the skull was made up of the premaxilla and nasal bones with this potentially leading to a very mobile nose in genera like Archaeoryctes. The part of the maxilla within the orbit was bordered by the front bone which caused the lacrimal and palatine to lack contact. The tympanic bulla of didymoconids was made up of fused ectotympanic and entotympanic bones which caused it to become fully ossified. Compared to groups that were once assigned to Lipotyphla like hedgehogs, the zygomatic arches in Didymoconidae were much larger even though their jugal bones were majorly reduced in size and did not make contact with the lacrimal. The exact dental formula of taxa within the family differ but they do all share the trait of being reduced in some way with 3-?.1.3-?.22-0.1.3-2.2 covering the range of dentition. The incisors were the smallest teeth in the dentition, being described as chisel-shaped, while the canines were but far the largest teeth. Didymoconid canines were generally similar to what is seen in other mammals. The premolars are simple with the fourth premolar on both the top and bottom dentitions being much more similar to the molars than the other premolars. The teeth that differ that most between the top and bottom dentitions are the molars. A large amount of the grooves of the molars such as the paracone and metacone of the upper molars and the protoconid and metaconid of the lower molars are very close together, also referred to as being "twinned" Sexual dimorphism has been noted as a possibility in at least some members of Didymoconidae like Ardynictis due to a number of features such as differences in the length of cheek tooth row and the anatomy of the horizontal ramus.

=== Postcranium ===
The postcranial material of Didymoconidae incomplete though is known from multiple genera within the family. This most commonly comes in the form of forelimb material such as the humerus and ulna. The forelimbs, including the hands, were much more robust than the hindlimbs. The elbow specifically, had a large olecranon which would have given the animal more leverage while digging.

== Paleoecology ==
Based on both cranial and postcranial anatomy, some members of Didymoconidae such as Didymoconus have been considered as being fossorial with the much more robust forelimbs with large claws being good tools for digging. A combination of the stronger skull and better low frequency hearing caused by the expansion of the middle ear space is also a trend seen in burrowing mammals. This lifestyle along with their cheek teeth that are specialized to puncture lead Xiaoming Wang and coauthors to suggest an insectivorous diet in their 2001 publication on Didymoconus. This insectivorous diet has been suggested for other genera such as Ardynictis though authors like A. V. Lopatin would suggest that the major differences in the dentition of Didymoconidae compared to more specialized burrows suggests that members of the group were digging through the top soil for invertebrates rather than burrowing. This more fossorial diet is also suggested by the large amount of wear seen in the cheek teeth which has been blamed on soil that would have entered the mouth when grabbing their prey.

One member of the family, Erlikotherium, has been suggested to have been specialized in eusocial insects like anteaters due to the loss of its incisors with its still present canines being used to break open mounds. The limb bones of Erlikotherium have also been noted to be much larger than other didymoconids like Khaichinula. Kennatherium is also notable due to the fact that though the animals humerus proportions were similar to Didymoconus, it was much more developed which suggests a more fossorial ecology for the animal.
