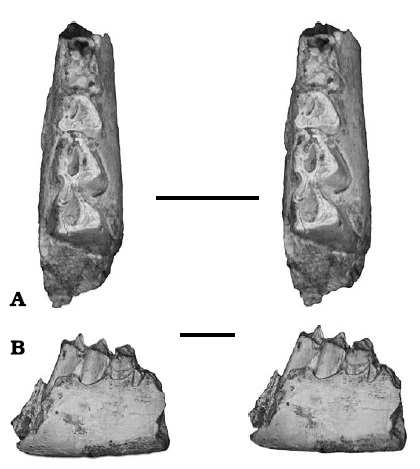
- Palaeohypsodontus zinensis from Oligocene of Pakistan

Scientific classification
- Kingdom: Animalia
- Phylum: Chordata
- Class: Mammalia
- Infraclass: Placentalia
- Order: Artiodactyla
- Family: Bovidae
- Genus: †Palaeohypsodontus; Trofimov, 1958

Type species
- Palaeohypsodontus asiaticus Trofimov, 1958

= Palaeohypsodontus =

Palaeohypsodontus Temporal range: Middle and Upper Oligocene

Extinct genus of bovid

Palaeohypsodontus is an extinct genus of small size Bovidae from Oligocene with unclear systematic position. It was originally described from a jaw fragment for P. asiaticus, from Mongolia, Middle Oligocene. The second species, P. zinensis was found in the Upper Oligocene of Pakistan and China.

== Characteristics ==
Size small. Molars with high crowns (hypsodont), lacking additional columns and tubercles. Second and third molars lacking outer folds on anterior margins; other margins rib-like. Third molar talonid widely rounded.
