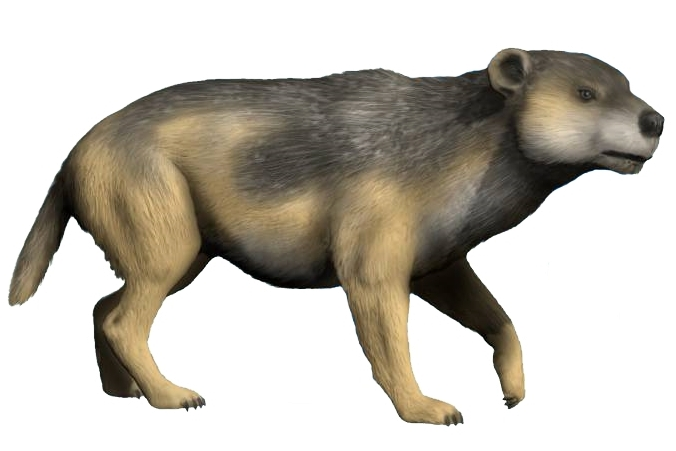
- Life reconstruction of Cephalogale shareri
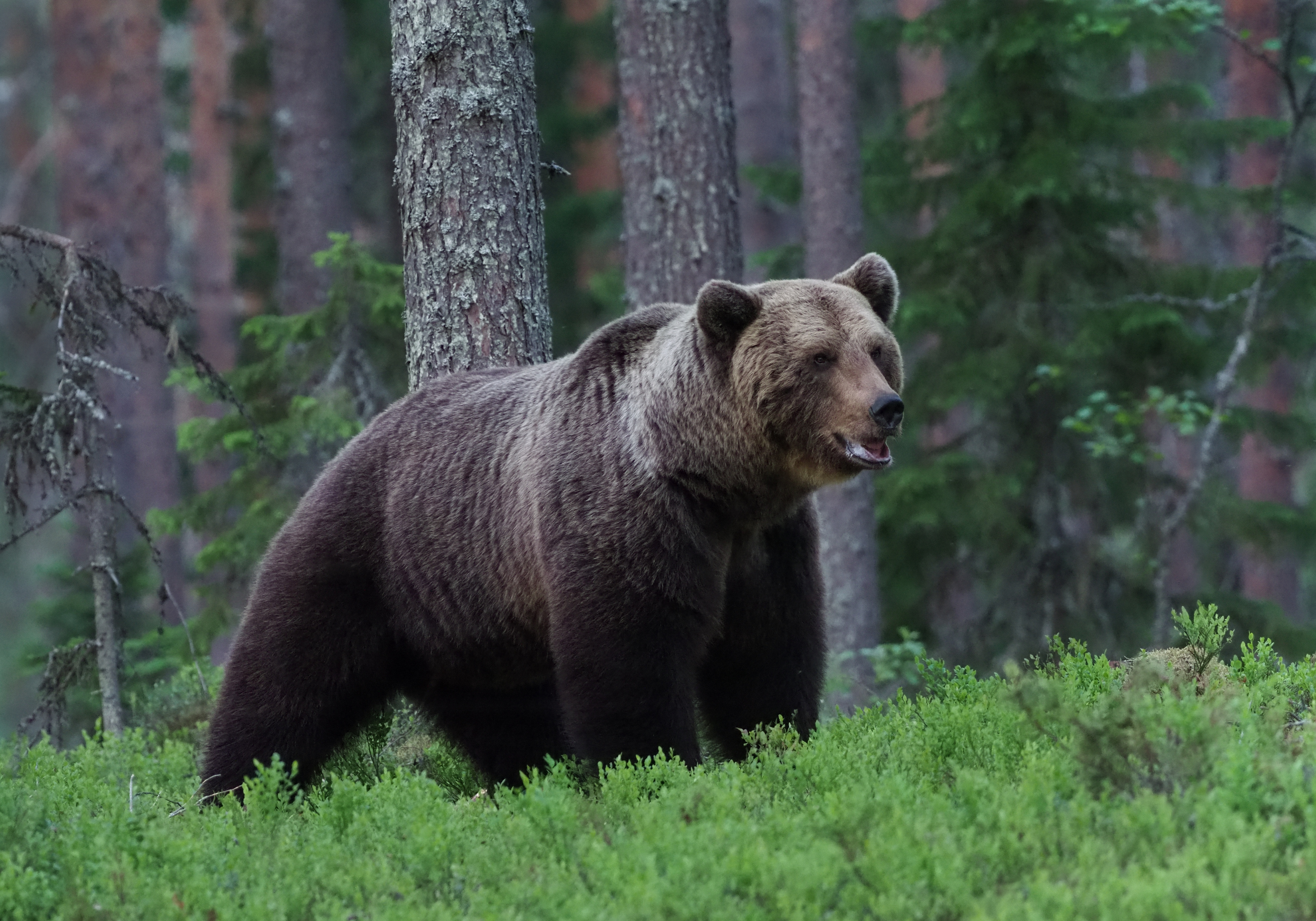
- Brown bear (Ursus arctos)

Scientific classification
- Kingdom: Animalia
- Phylum: Chordata
- Class: Mammalia
- Infraclass: Placentalia
- Order: Carnivora
- Parvorder: Ursida
- Superfamily: Ursoidea; Fischer von Waldheim, 1817

Families
- †Subparictidae; †Amphicynodontidae?; Ursidae

= Ursoidea =

Ursoidea Temporal range: Bartonian - Present 37–0 Ma

Superfamily of mammals

Ursoidea is a superfamily of arctoid carnivoran mammals that includes the family Ursidae, which contains all extant lineages of bears, as well as the extinct families Subparictidae and Amphicynodontidae. Ursidae in turn also includes the extinct subfamilies Hemicyoninae and Ursavinae.

The interrelationships of ursoids has had slight arrangements. In the past it was thought the extinct Amphicyonidae were stem-bears based on morphological analysis of the ear region, though the most recent publications on early amphicyonids suggests they were basal caniforms.

The amphicynodontids are sometimes classified as either a subfamily of bears, a paraphyletic assemblage of early bears, or even stem-pinnipeds. The subparictids were previously classified as amphicynodontine/ids. The hemicyonines have been occasionally reclassified as a separate family.
