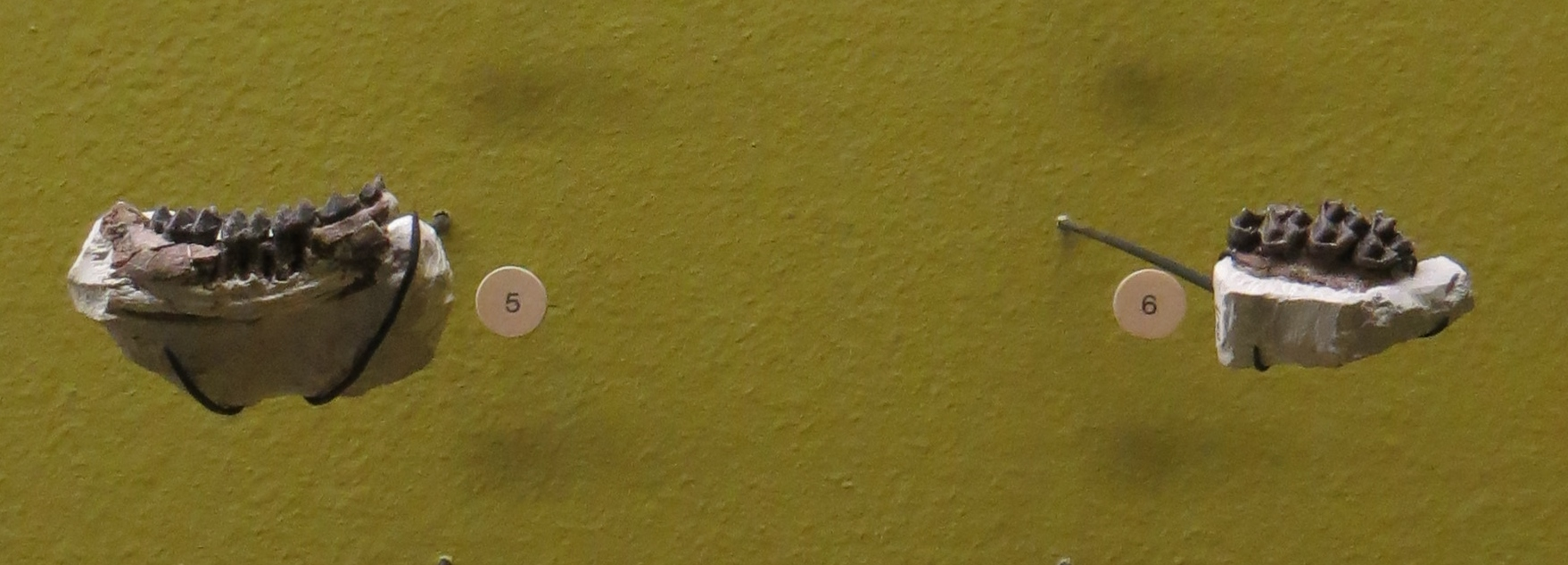
- Gelocus communis mandibles, Museum of Natural History Basel

Scientific classification
- Kingdom: Animalia
- Phylum: Chordata
- Class: Mammalia
- Order: Artiodactyla
- Infraorder: Tragulina
- Family: †Gelocidae; Schlosser, 1886

Genera
- Phaneromeryx; Paragelocus; Gelocus; Pseudogelocus; Prodremotherium; Cryptomeryx; Pseudoceras; Floridameryx; Gobiomeryx; Rutitherium; Eumeryx

= Gelocidae =

Gelocidae Temporal range: Priabonian-Messinian, 36.0–6.0 Ma

Extinct family of mammals

The Gelocidae are an extinct family of hornless ruminantia that are estimated to have lived during the Eocene and Oligocene epochs, from 36 MYA to 6 MYA. The family generally includes ruminants with dental traits of both the Tragulina and Pecora, making it a notorious wastebasket taxon with unresolved affinities.

== Description ==
Members of the family Gelocidae were long-legged, even-toed ungulates adapted for running and grazing. The Gelocidae likely share a close common ancestor with Moschidae and were of a similar size and shape. They had similar dentition and proportions to members of Moschidae, but lacked the sabre-like tusks of the modern musk deer.

== Bibliography ==
Webb, S. D.; Taylor, B. E. (31 December 1980). "The phylogeny of hornless ruminants and a description of the cranium of Archaeomeryx". Bulletin of the American Museum of Natural History. 167: 117–158.
