= River otter =

River otter may refer to:

== Otters ==
There are several species of fresh water otters commonly known as river otters.

- Eurasian river otter, found in Eurasia
- Giant river otter, found in South America
- Japanese river otter, an extinct species
- Neotropical river otter, found in Central and South America
- North American river otter, found in North America
- Southern river otter, found in Chile and Argentina

== Other uses ==
- River Otter, Devon, a river in South West England
- Missouri River Otters, a former minor league hockey team from St. Charles, Missouri

== See also ==
- Otter (disambiguation)
- Otter River (disambiguation)
- River Ottery, Cornwall
