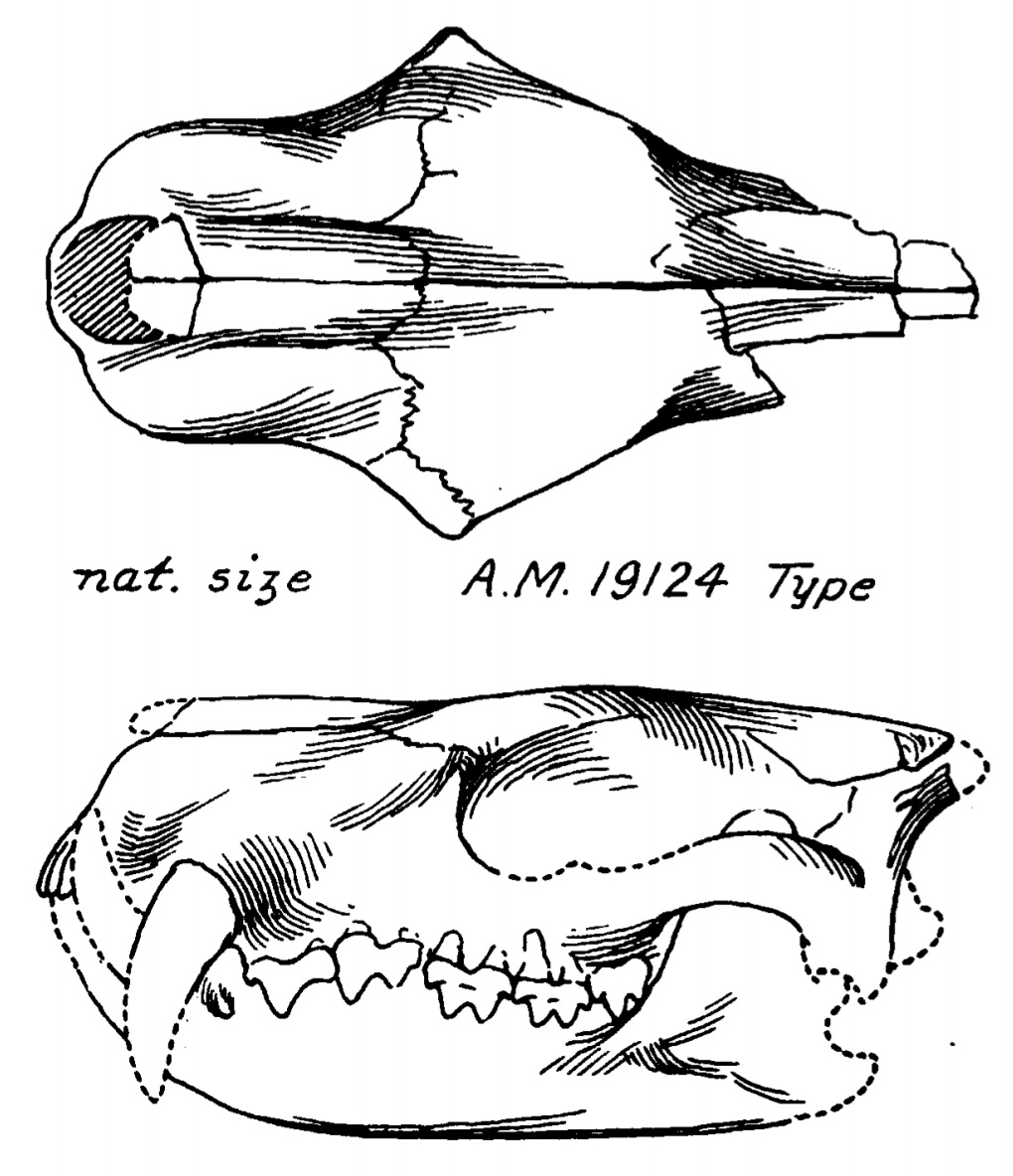
- Holotype skull of D. colgatei

Scientific classification
- Kingdom: Animalia
- Phylum: Chordata
- Class: Mammalia
- Family: †Didymoconidae
- Subfamily: †Didymoconinae
- Genus: †Didymoconus; Matthew & Granger, 1924

Type species
- †Didymoconus colgatei Matthew & Granger, 1924

Other species
- †D. berkeyi Matthew & Granger, 1924; †D. gromovae Lopatin, 1997; †D. rostrata Gromova, 1960

Synonyms
- †Tshelkaria Gromova, 1960

= Didymoconus =

Didymoconus Temporal range: Early Oligocene

Extinct genus of mammal

Didymoconus is an extinct genus of mammal that lived during the early Oligocene epoch. It was endemic to Asia, and its fossils have been found in Mongolia, China and Kazakhstan. It is the type genus of the Didymoconidae, a family of eutherian mammals with uncertain taxonomic affinities.

== History of discovery ==
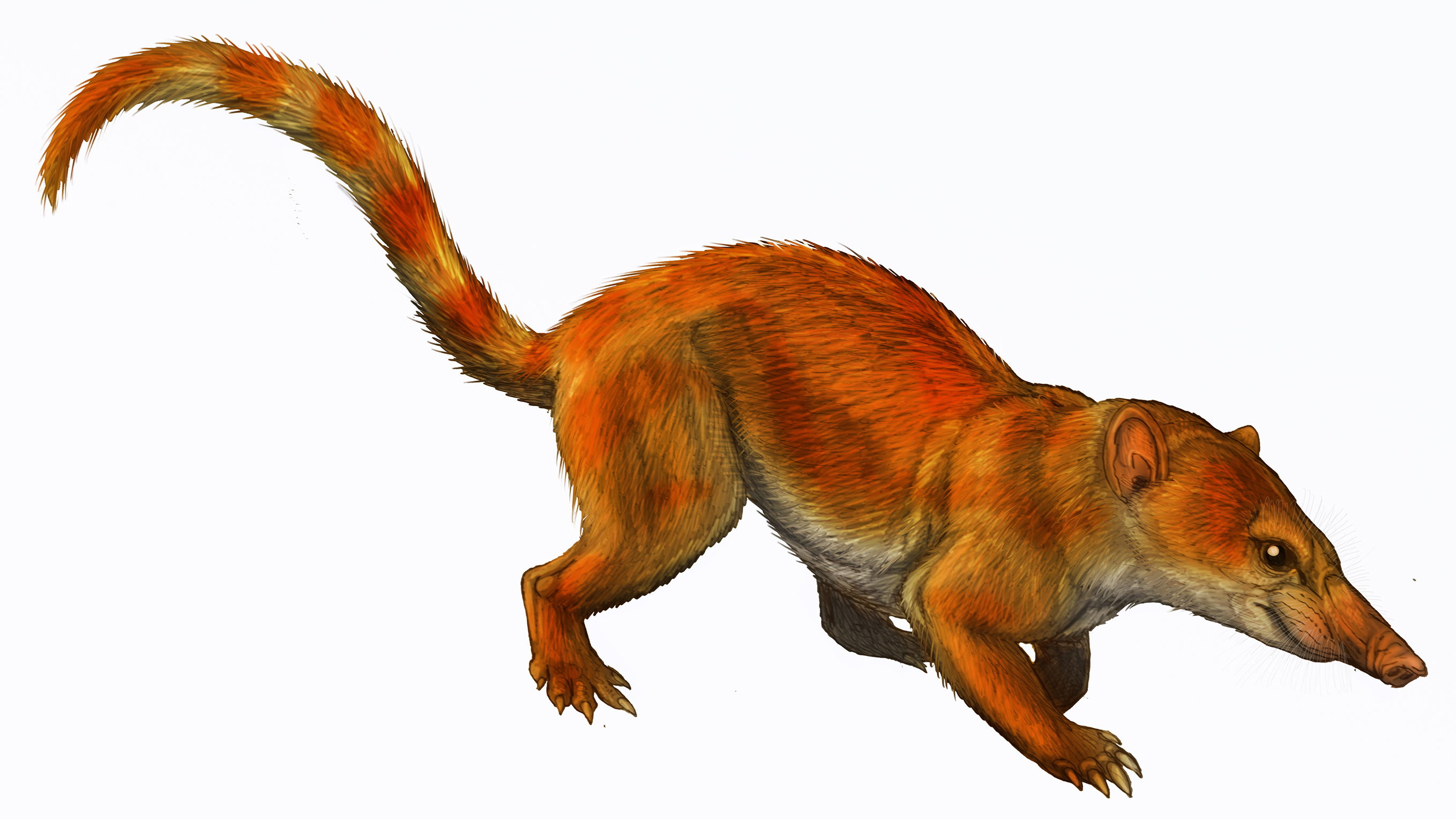
Life restoration

Fossilized remains of Didymoconus were first discovered during the Central Asiatic Expeditions of the American Museum of Natural History in the 1920s. In 1924, Matthew & Granger erected the genus with D. colgatei as the type species, while also erecting the species D. berkeyi. The holotype of D. colgatei is a skull (AMNH 19124), and two lower jaws (AMNH 19003 & 19004) were established as paratypes, while the type specimen of D. berkeyi is a set of lower jaws (AMNH 19001). All these specimens were collected from the Hsanda Gol Formation of Mongolia.

Gromova (1960) erected the genus Tshelkaria with T. rostrata as the type species, the holotype for this species being collected from Kazakhstan. An additional species, T. robusta, was also referred to this genus. Though this genus was initially deemed distinct from Didymoconus based on certain dental features, these features were later noted to be present in the holotype of Didymoconus colgatei, and thus Tshelkaria is currently recognized as a junior synonym of Didymoconus. T. rostrata is now placed in Didymoconus as D. rostrata, while T. robusta is a junior synonym of D. colgatei.

In 1997, Lopatin assigned a fourth species to the genus. Named Didymoconus gromovae, it is named after paleontologist V.I. Gromova. The holotype of this species is a fragment of the left mandibular ramus collected from the Chelkamura Formation of Chalkar-Teniz, Kazakhstan.
