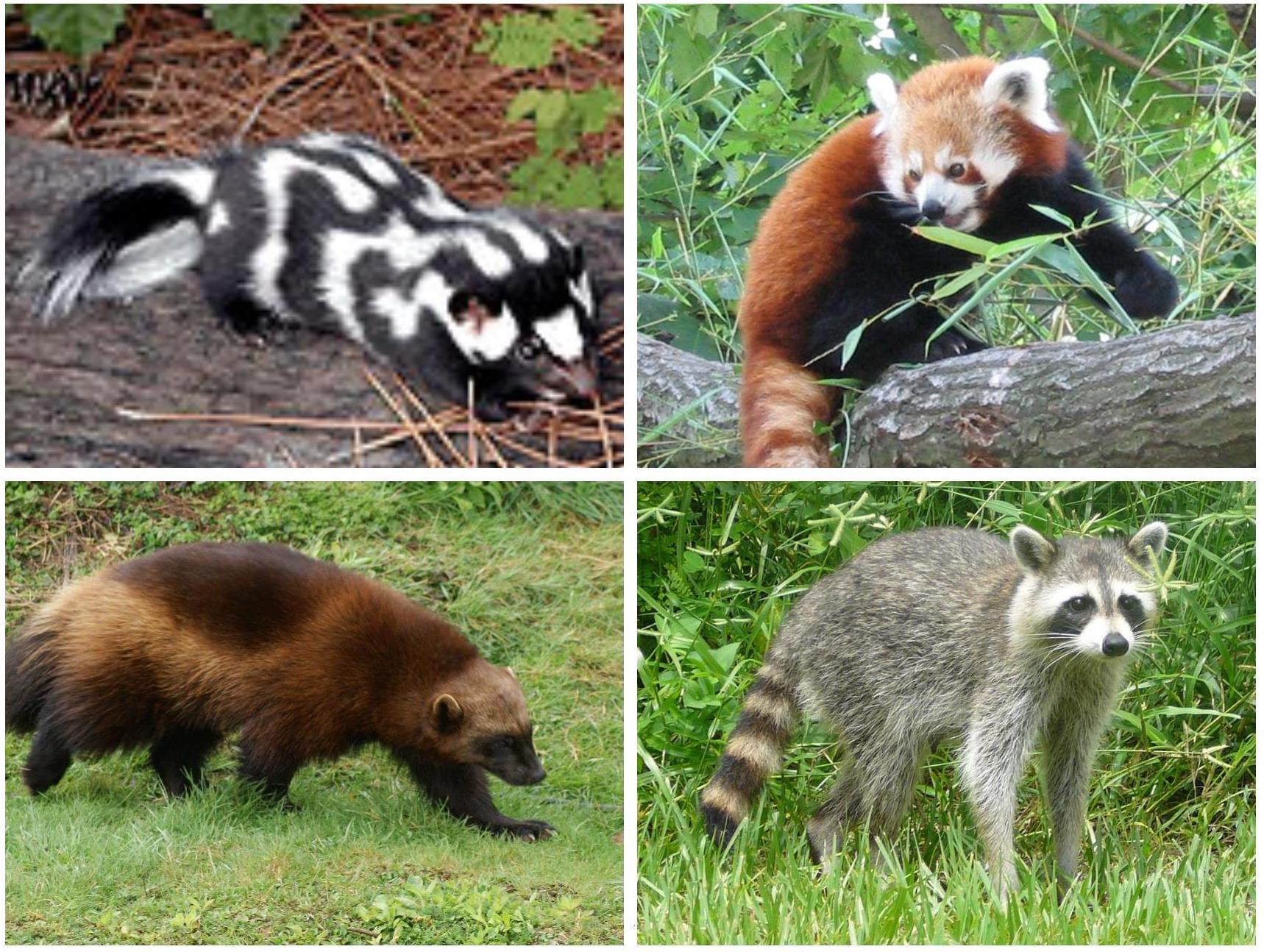
- Left-right: spotted skunk, red panda, wolverine and raccoon; representing the families Mephitidae, Ailuridae, Mustelidae and Procyonidae.

Scientific classification
- Kingdom: Animalia
- Phylum: Chordata
- Class: Mammalia
- Order: Carnivora
- Suborder: Caniformia
- Clade: Canoidea
- Infraorder: Arctoidea
- Parvorder: Mustelida
- Superfamily: Musteloidea; Fischer, 1817

Families
- Ailuridae; Amphictidae; Mephitidae; Mustelidae (type); Procyonidae; Incertae sedis; †Huntictis; †Mustelavus; †Peignictis

= Musteloidea =

Musteloidea Temporal range: Oligocene–Present

Superfamily of carnivoran mammals

Musteloidea is a superfamily of carnivoran mammals united by shared characteristics of the skull and teeth. Musteloids are the sister group of pinnipeds, the group which includes seals and allies.

== Taxonomy ==
Musteloidea comprises the following families:

- Ailuridae, the red panda (and its extinct kin).
- Mephitidae, skunks and stink badgers.
- Mustelidae, the weasel (mustelid) family, including new- and old-world badgers, ferrets and polecats, fishers, grisons and ratels, martens and sables, minks, river and sea otters, stoats and ermines, tayras and wolverines.
- Procyonidae, raccoons and raccoon-like procyonids, including coatis, kinkajous, olingos, the olinguito, ringtails and cacomistles.

== Evolution ==
In North America, ursids (bears) and musteloids first appeared in the Chadronian of the late Eocene, and in early-Oligocene Europe, immediately following the Grande Coupure extinction event.

The following cladogram is based on molecular phylogeny of six genes in Flynn (2005), with the musteloids updated following the multigene analysis of Law et al. (2018).

- Caniformia
  - Canidae (dogs and other canines)
  - Arctoidea
    - Ursidae (bears)
    - - Pinnipedia (seals)
      - Musteloidea ("weasel" superfamily)
        - Mephitidae (skunks)
        - Ailuridae (red pandas)
        - - Procyonidae (raccoons, coatis, kinkajous)
          - Mustelidae (weasels, otters, badgers)
