= Drassonax =

Drassonax Temporal range: Orellan

Scientific classification
- Kingdom: Animalia
- Phylum: Chordata
- Class: Mammalia
- Order: Carnivora
- Subfamily: †Amphicynodontinae
- Genus: †Drassonax; Galbreath (1953)

Extinct genus of carnivores

Drassonax is an extinct genus of small, weasel-like bear-dog. It lived in North America during the Early Oligocene, around 33 Ma.
