= Plesictis =

Plesictis Temporal range: Early Oligocene–Early Miocene

Scientific classification
- Kingdom: Animalia
- Phylum: Chordata
- Class: Mammalia
- Order: Carnivora
- Family: Mustelidae
- Genus: †Plesictis; Pomel (1846)

Extinct genus of carnivores

Plesictis is an extinct prehistoric genus of mustelid (originally described as a procyonid) endemic to Europe during the Oligocene and Miocene 33.9—20.0 Ma existing for approximately 13.9 million years.

Plesictis was a 75 centimetres (2.46 ft) long animal, resembling a weasel with large eyes, or possibly a cacomistle. Its large eyes and very long tail suggest that it may have been nocturnal and arboreal. Judging from its teeth, it was an omnivore.
