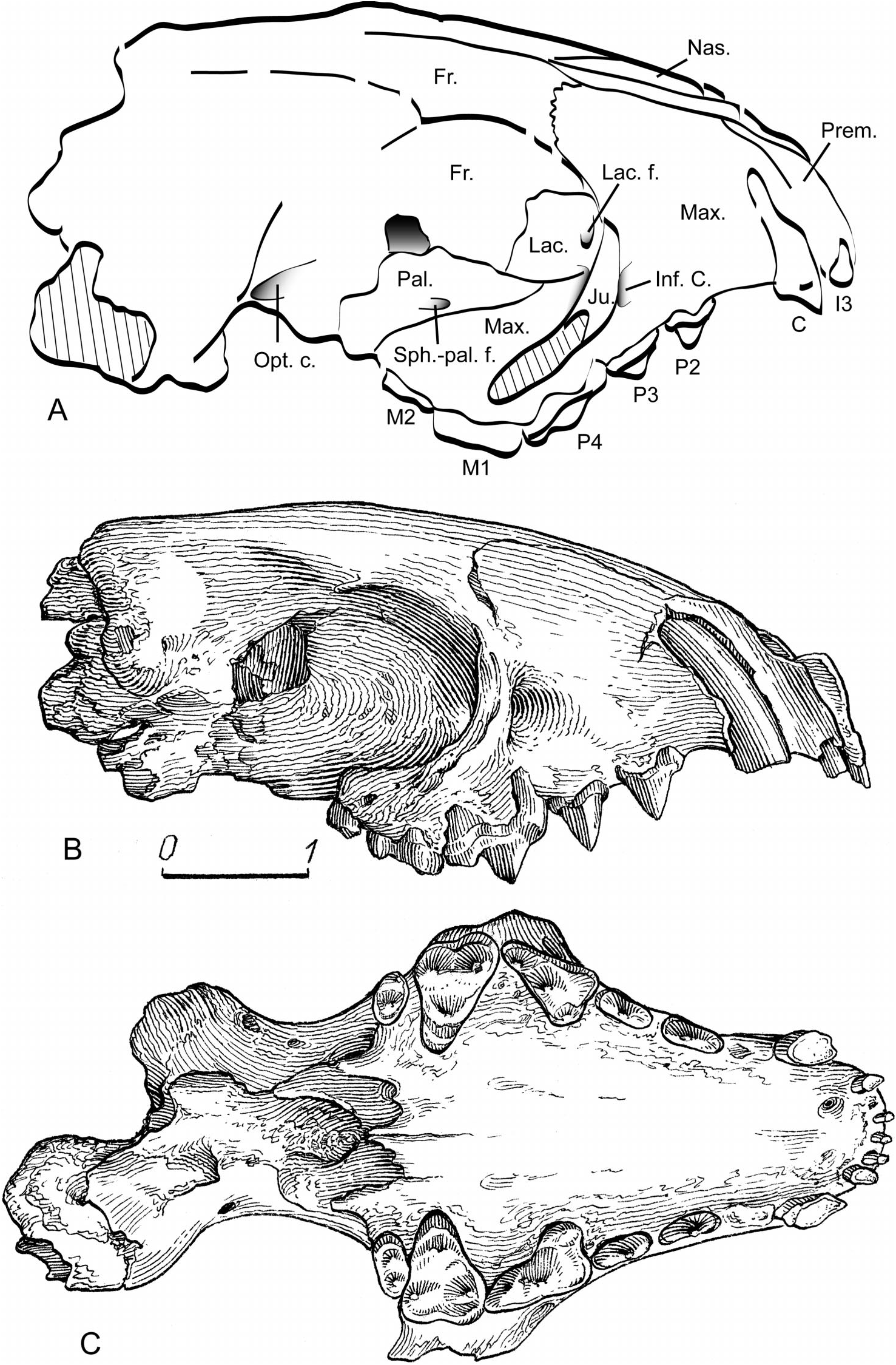
- Dorsolateral aspect of skull in Amphicynodon teilhardi

Scientific classification
- Domain: Eukaryota
- Kingdom: Animalia
- Phylum: Chordata
- Class: Mammalia
- Order: Carnivora
- Family: †Amphicynodontidae
- Genus: †Amphicynodon; Filhol, 1881

Type species
- †Amphicynodon velaunus (Aymard, 1846)

Species
- †A. mongoliensis Janovskaja, 1970; †A. teilhardi Matthew and Granger, 1924; †A. typicus Schlosser, 1888; †A. chardini Cirot and De Bonis, 1992; †A. cephalogalinus Teilhard, 1915; †A. gracilis (Filhol, 1874); †A. crassirostris (Filhol, 1876); †A. brachyrostris (Filhol, 1876); †A. leptorhynchus (Filhol, 1874); †A. velaunus (Aymard, 1846)

Synonyms
- Cynodon Aymard, 1848

= Amphicynodon =

Amphicynodon Temporal range: Oligocene

Extinct genus of mammals

Amphicynodon was an extinct genus of caniform carnivore. It has traditionally been considered an early bear, although recent evidence has suggested it may be a unique member linked to other pinnipeds. It was endemic to Europe and Asia during the Oligocene, from approximately 33.9—28.4 Mya and existing for approximately 6 million years. It was similar in size to early mustelids.

== Fossil distribution ==
Some sites:

- Ulaan Khongil, Mongolia
- Ronzon site, Auvergne France
