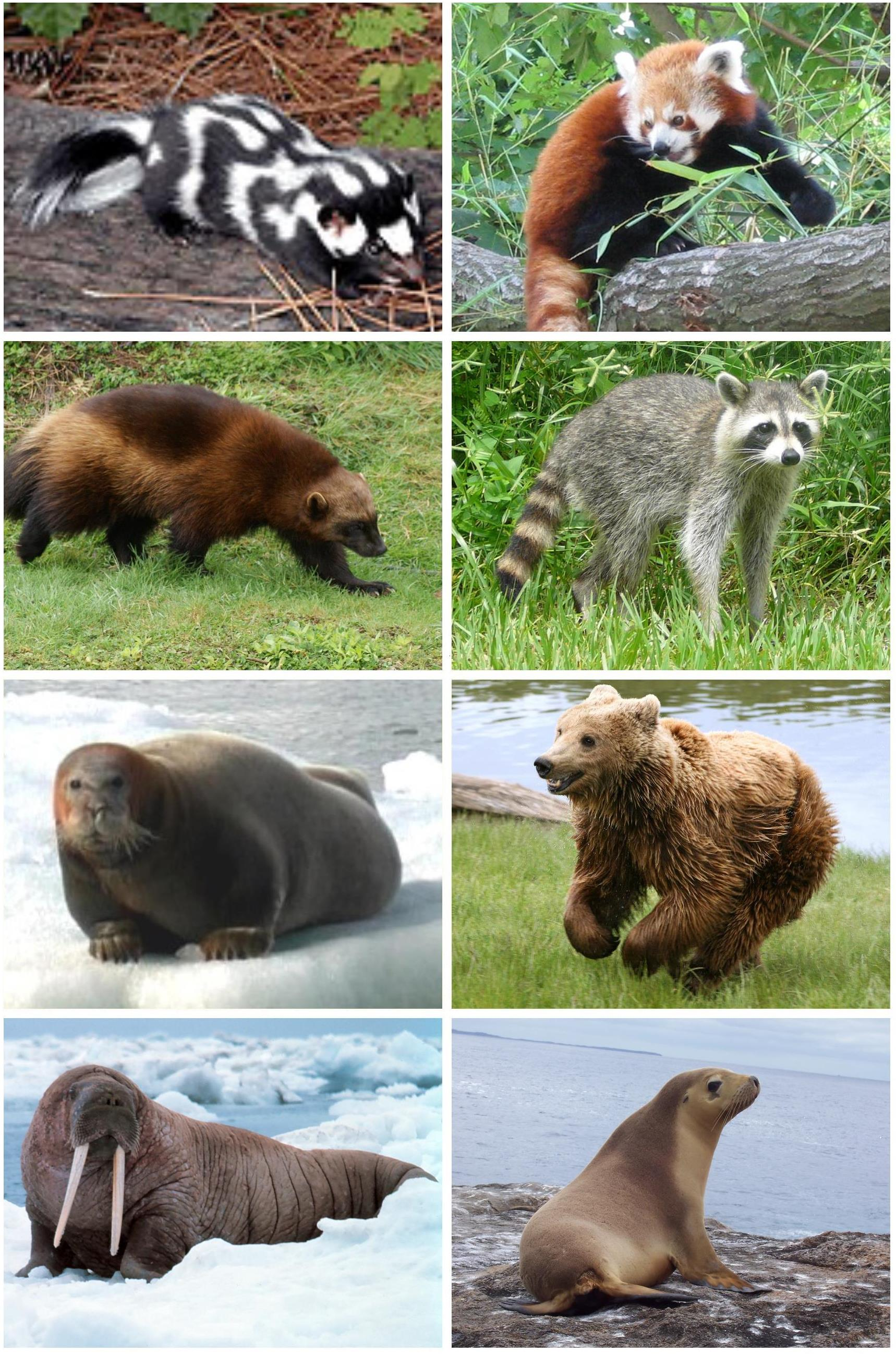

Scientific classification
- Kingdom: Animalia
- Phylum: Chordata
- Class: Mammalia
- Order: Carnivora
- Suborder: Caniformia
- Clade: Canoidea
- Infraorder: Arctoidea; Flower, 1869

Subclades
- †Lonchocyon; †Amphicyonidae?; Ursoidea; †Subparictidae; †Amphicynodontidae?; Ursidae; Mustelida; Musteloidea; Pan-Pinnipedia Wolsan et al., 2020; †Amphicynodontidae?; †Semantoridae; Pinnipedimorpha

= Arctoidea =

Arctoidea Temporal range: Eocene–Holocene, 46–0 Ma

Infraorder of mammals

Arctoidea is an infraorder (or clade) of mostly carnivorous mammals which include the extant Musteloidea (weasels, raccoons, skunks, red pandas, and kin), Pinnipedia (seals, sea lions), and Ursidae (bears), and their various extinct relatives. Arctoids are found on all continents from the Eocene, 46 million years ago, to the present. The oldest living subgroup in this clade are the bears, as their CMAH gene is still intact. The gene became non-functional in the common ancestor of the Mustelida (the musteloids and pinnipeds). Arctoids are caniforms, along with dogs (canids) and extinct "bear dogs" (Amphicyonidae). The earliest caniforms were superficially similar to martens, which are tree-dwelling mustelids. Together with feliforms, caniforms compose the order Carnivora.

== Phylogeny ==
The cladogram is based on molecular phylogeny of six genes in Flynn (2005), with the musteloids updated following the multigene analysis of Law et al. (2018).

- Caniformia
  - Amphicyonidae†
  - - Canidae
    - Arctoidea
      - Ursoidea
        - Hemicyonidae†
        - Ursidae
      - Mustelida
        - Pinnipedia
          - Enaliarctidae†
          - - Phocidae
            - - Otariidae
              - Odobenidae
        - Musteloidea
          - Mephitidae
          - Ailuridae
          - - Procyonidae
            - Mustelidae
