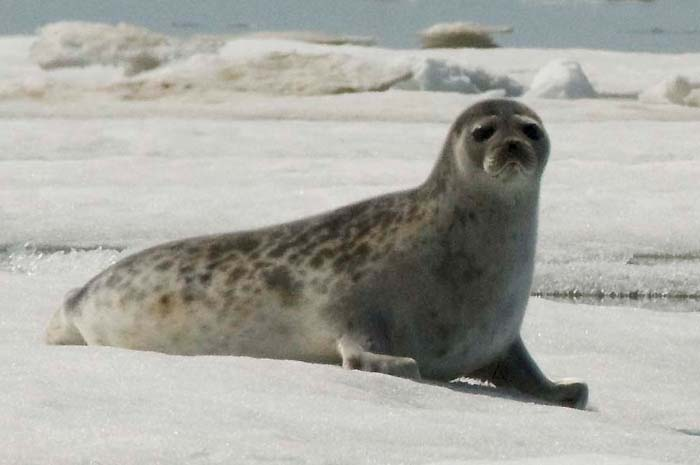

Conservation status
- Least Concern (IUCN 3.1)

- Secure (NatureServe)

Scientific classification
- Kingdom: Animalia
- Phylum: Chordata
- Class: Mammalia
- Order: Carnivora
- Parvorder: Pinnipedia
- Family: Phocidae
- Genus: Pusa
- Species: P. hispida

Binomial name
- Pusa hispida (Schreber, 1775)
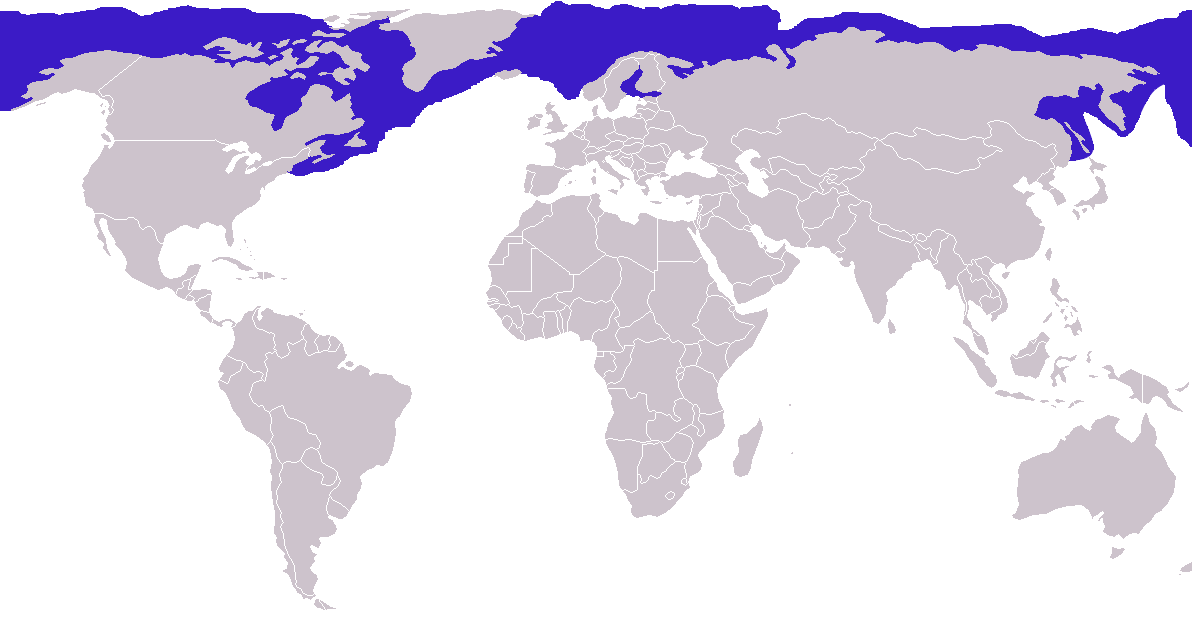

Synonyms
- Phoca hispida

= Ringed seal =

Species of carnivore

The ringed seal (Pusa hispida) is a small earless seal species found in Arctic and sub-Arctic regions. Its common name is derived from a distinctive patterning of dark spots surrounded by light gray rings.

The ringed seal is the most abundant and wide-ranging ice seal in the Northern Hemisphere; they can be found throughout the Arctic Ocean, into the Bering Sea and Okhotsk Sea as far south as the northern coast of Japan in the Pacific, and throughout the North Atlantic coasts of Greenland, Baltic Sea, Scandinavia as far south as Newfoundland. Two freshwater subspecies live in northern Europe. They are the smallest members of the seal family found in these regions, averaging 1.5 metres (5 ft) in length.

The average lifespan of a ringed seal is 40 years. They have a solitary lifestyle, and their diet consists mostly of Arctic cod and planktonic crustaceans. They are a primary prey of polar bears – which are their primary predator – and killer whales, and have long been a component of the diet of indigenous people of the Arctic.

Recently, the biggest threat to ringed seals has been the changing temperature in the Arctic and the detrimental changes to sea ice that follow. Declines in snowpack and sea ice due to increasing ocean temperatures and atmospheric temperatures poses a threat to their survival. However, some projections indicate that the extinction of their predators due to warming may ultimately allow ringed seal numbers to thrive.

== Description ==
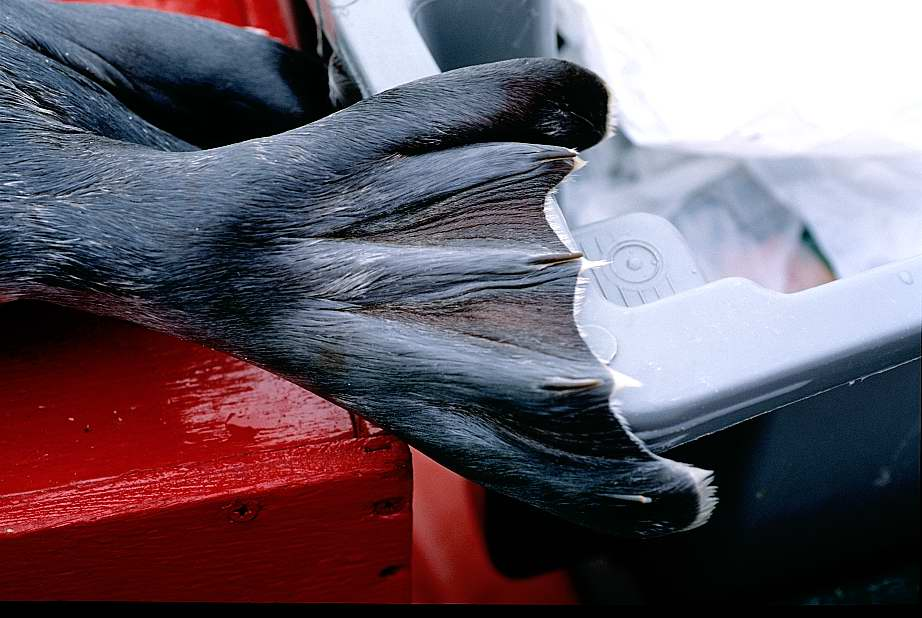
Back flippers

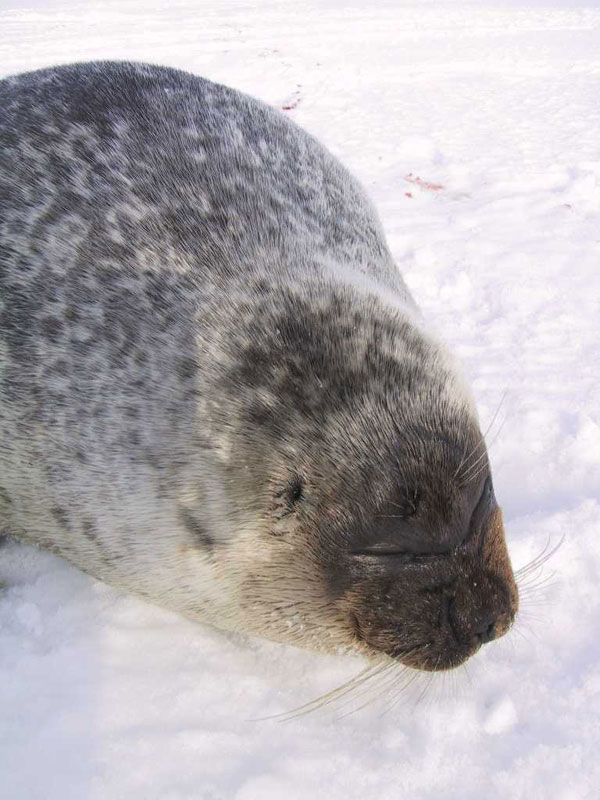
Photograph of head

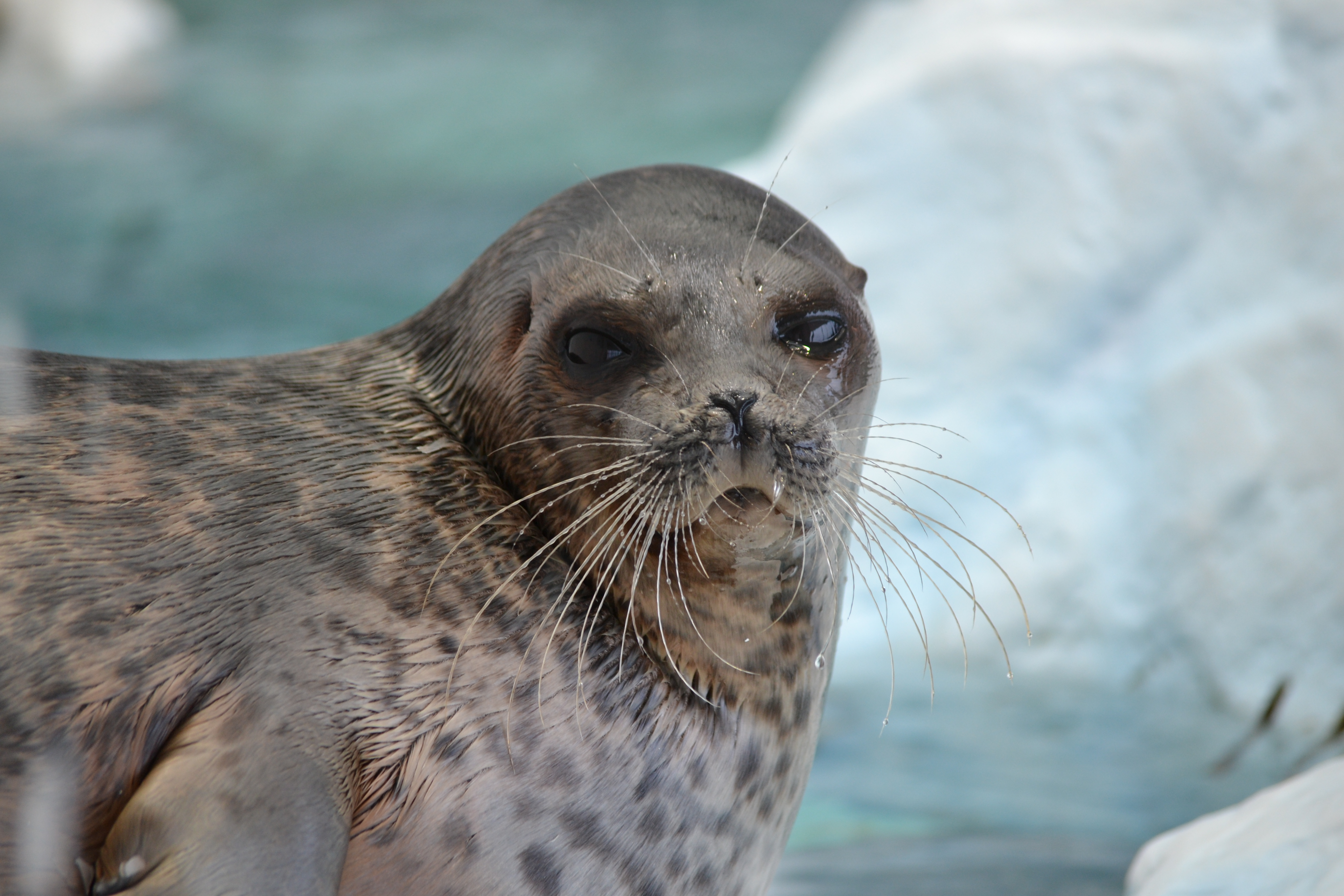
Close-up of face at Osaka Aquarium

The ringed seal is the smallest and most common seal in the Arctic, with a small head, short cat-like snout, and a plump body. Its coat is dark with silver rings on the back and sides and a silver belly, giving this seal its vernacular name. Depending on subspecies and condition, adult size can range from 100 to 175 cm (39.5 to 69 in) and adult weight can vary from 32 to 140 kg (71 to 309 lb). Its average length is about 5 ft (1.5 m) long, with an average weight of about 50–70 kg (110–150 lb). Though it is generally considered the smallest species in the true seal family, several related species, especially the Baikal seal, may approach similarly small dimensions. Their small front flippers have claws more than 2.5 cm (1 in) thick that are used to maintain breathing holes through ice sheets as thick as 6 ft (1.8 m).

== Taxonomy and phylogeny ==
The taxonomy of the ringed seal has been much debated and revised in the literature. Due to its wide range, as many as ten subspecies have been described. Currently, five distinct subspecies are recognized: P. h. hispida in the Arctic Ocean and Bering Sea, P. h. ochotensis in the Sea of Okhotsk, P. h. saimensis in Lake Saimaa in Finland, P. h. ladogensis in nearby Lake Ladoga in Russia and P. h. botnica in the Gulf of Bothnia. The ringed seal is most closely related to the Caspian seal (P. caspica) and Baikal seal (P. sibirica), all of which share similar small sizes, features of skull morphology and affinity for ice.

The closest phylogenetic relatives to the genus Pusa are the grey seal (Halichoerus grypus) and the species in the genus Phoca (the harbor seal and largha seal), in which ringed seals were formerly classified. Together with the remaining northern latitude ice seals (ribbon seal, bearded seal, harp seal and hooded seal), these seals constitute the subfamily, Phocinae.

=== Subspecies ===
The populations living in different areas have evolved to separate subspecies, which are currently recognized as:

Image	Subspecies	Distribution
	Pusa hispida hispida (Arctic ringed seal)	Arctic coasts of Europe, Russia, Canada and Alaska, including Novaya Zemlya, Spitsbergen, Greenland and Baffin Island.
	Pusa hispida ochotensis	Kamchatka, Okhotsk Sea and southward to 35°N, along the Japanese Pacific coast.
	Pusa hispida botnica (validity questionable)	The Baltic Sea, especially in the Bothnian Bay where there is a large population, but there are also populations in the Gulf of Finland, the Gulf of Riga and the Archipelago Sea. A publication from the HELCOM organisation classified P. h. botnica as 'vulnerable' in 2013.
	Pusa hispida ladogensis (Ladoga ringed seal)	Lake Ladoga
	Pusa hispida saimensis (Saimaa ringed seal)	Lives only in Lake Saimaa in Finland and is one of the most threatened seals in the world, with a total population of approximately 500 individuals as of late 2024.

The three last subspecies are isolated from the others, like the closely related Baikal seal and Caspian seal.

== Range and habitat ==
Ringed seals occur throughout the Arctic Ocean. They can be found in the Baltic Sea, the Bering Sea and the Hudson Bay. They prefer to rest on ice floe and will move farther north for denser ice. Two subspecies, P. h. saimensis and ladogensis, can be found in freshwater.

Ringed seals have a circumpolar distribution from approximately 35°N to the North Pole, occurring in all seas of the Arctic Ocean. In the North Pacific, they are found in the southern Bering Sea and range as far south as the seas of Okhotsk and Japan. Throughout their range, ringed seals have an affinity for ice-covered waters and are well adapted to occupying seasonal and permanent ice. They tend to prefer large floes (i.e., > 48 m in diameter) and are often found in the interior ice pack where the sea ice coverage is greater than 90%. They remain in contact with ice most of the year and pup on the ice in late winter-early spring.

Ringed seals are found throughout the Beaufort, Chukchi, and Bering Seas, as far south as Bristol Bay in years of extensive ice coverage. During late April through June, ringed seals are distributed throughout their range from the southern ice edge northward. Preliminary results from recent surveys conducted in the Chukchi Sea in May–June 1999 and 2000 indicate that ringed seal density is higher in nearshore fast and pack ice, and lower in offshore pack ice. In the Alaskan Beaufort Sea, the ringed seals density in early summer is higher to the east than to the west of Flaxman Island. The winter distribution is probably similar, and the seals probably move northward with the ice edge in late spring and summer. Thus, ringed seals in the Bering and southern Chukchi seas appear migratory.

Ringed seals reside in arctic waters and are commonly associated with ice floes and pack ice. The ringed seal maintains a breathing hole in the ice thus allowing it to use ice habitat that other seals cannot.

== Life history ==
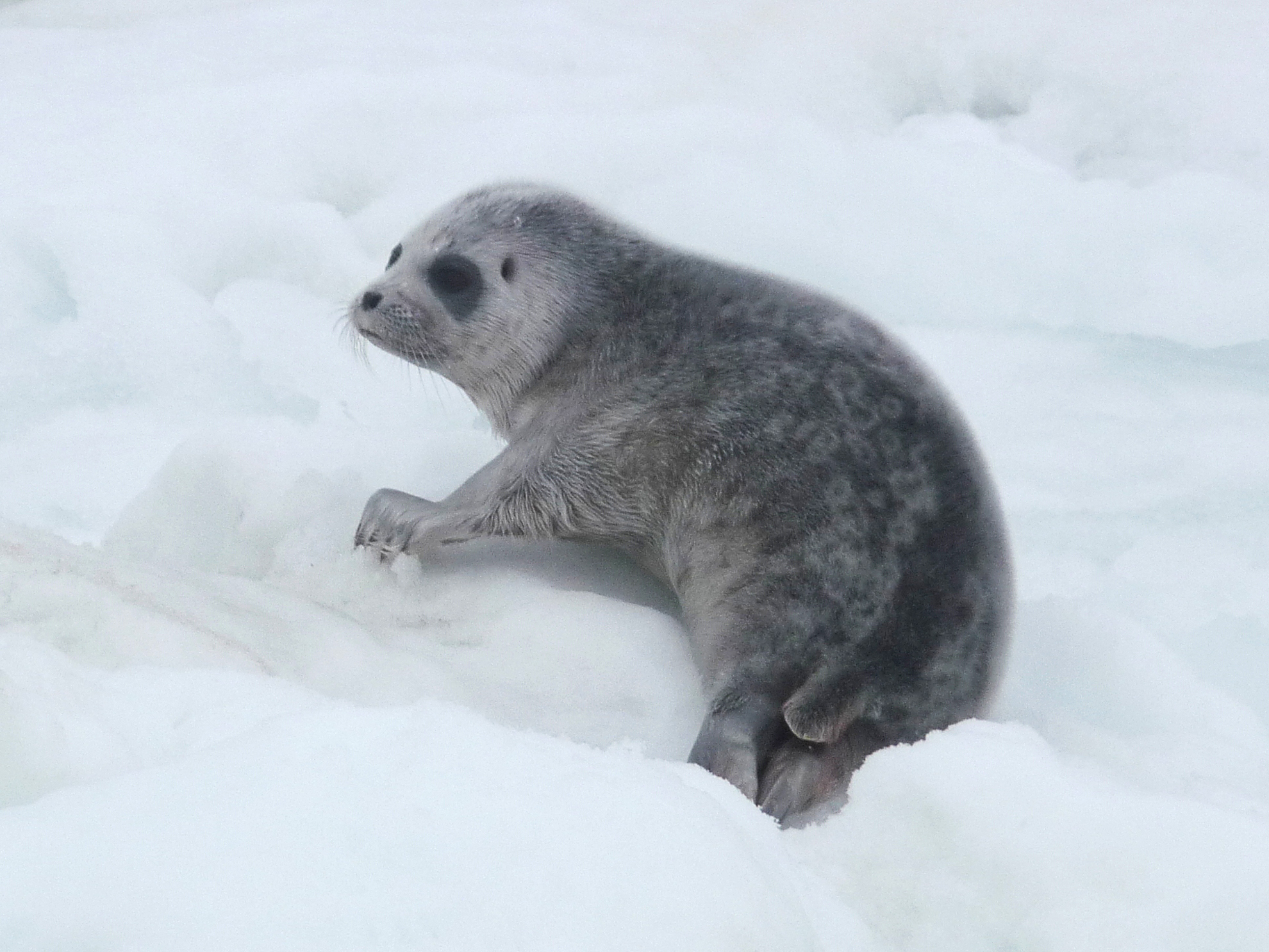
Pup of ringed seal.

Females reach sexual maturity at 4 years old while males do not reach maturity until 7 years old. During the spring breeding season, females construct lairs within the thick ice and give birth in these structures. Females give birth to a single pup on ice floes or shorefast ice in March or April after a 9-month gestation period. Pups are weaned after two months and build up a thick layer of blubber.

Females usually begin mating in late April. Males will roam the ice for a mate. When found, the male and female may spend several days together before mating, after which the male looks for another mate.

Ringed seals live about 25 to 30 years. They are solitary animals and when hauled out on ice, they separate themselves from each other by hundreds of yards.

== Ecology ==
=== Diet ===
Ringed seals eat a wide variety of small prey that consists of 72 species of fish and invertebrates. Feeding is usually a solitary behavior and their prey of choice includes mysids, shrimp, euphausiids, amphipods, other crustaceans, cephalopods, arctic cod, herring, prickleback, and sculpin. While feeding, ringed seals dive to depths of 35 to 150 ft (11 to 46 m). In the summer ringed seals feed along the edge of the sea-ice on polar cod and saffron cod. In shallow water they feed on smaller cod. Ringed seals may also eat herring, smelt, whitefish, sculpin, perch, and crustaceans.

=== Predators ===
Ringed seals are an important food item in particular for polar bears. During the pupping season, Arctic fox and glaucous gulls take ringed seal pups born outside lairs while killer whales, Greenland sharks and occasionally Atlantic walruses prey upon them in the water.

== Human interactions ==
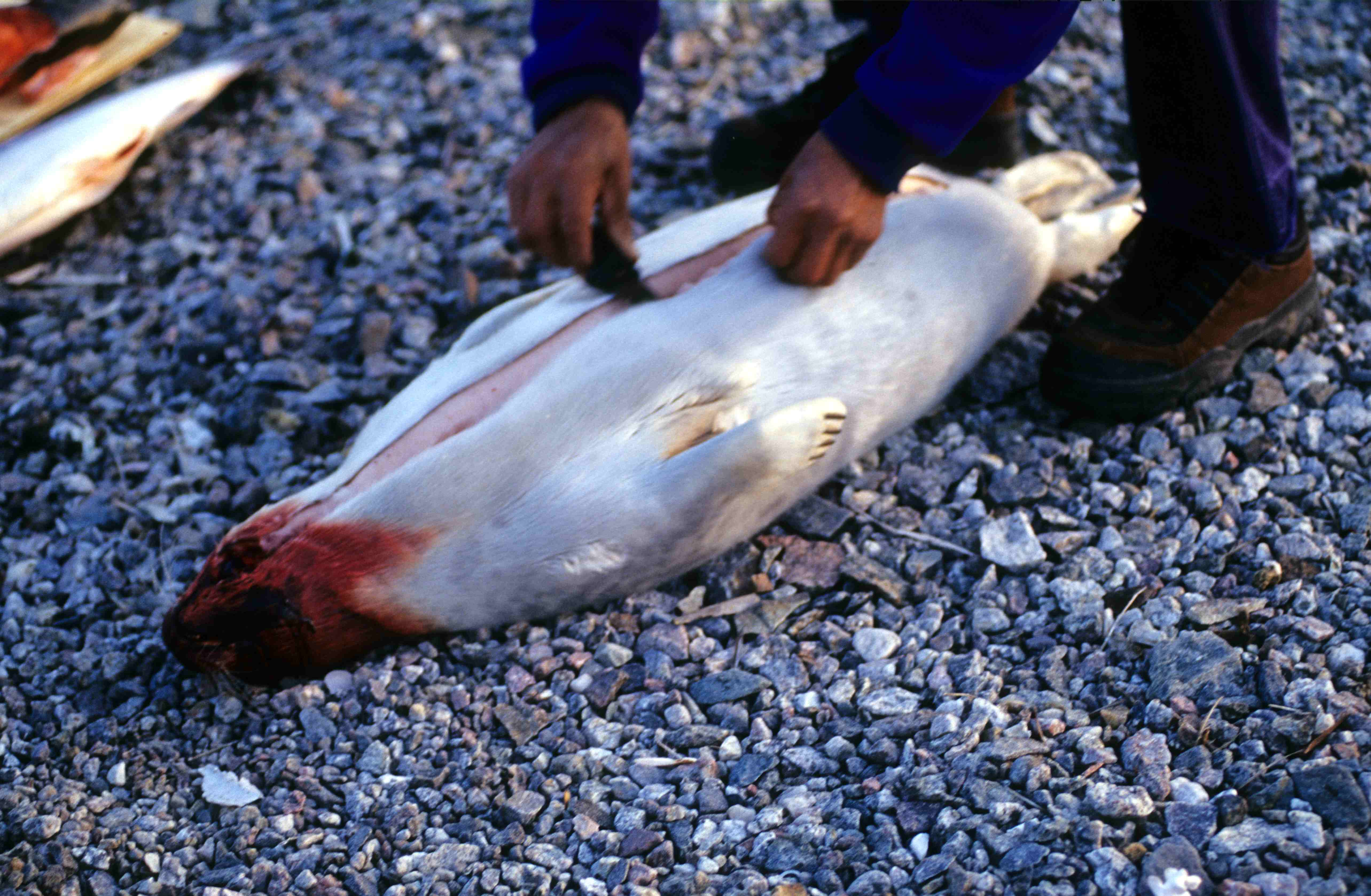
Preparation of the ringed seal

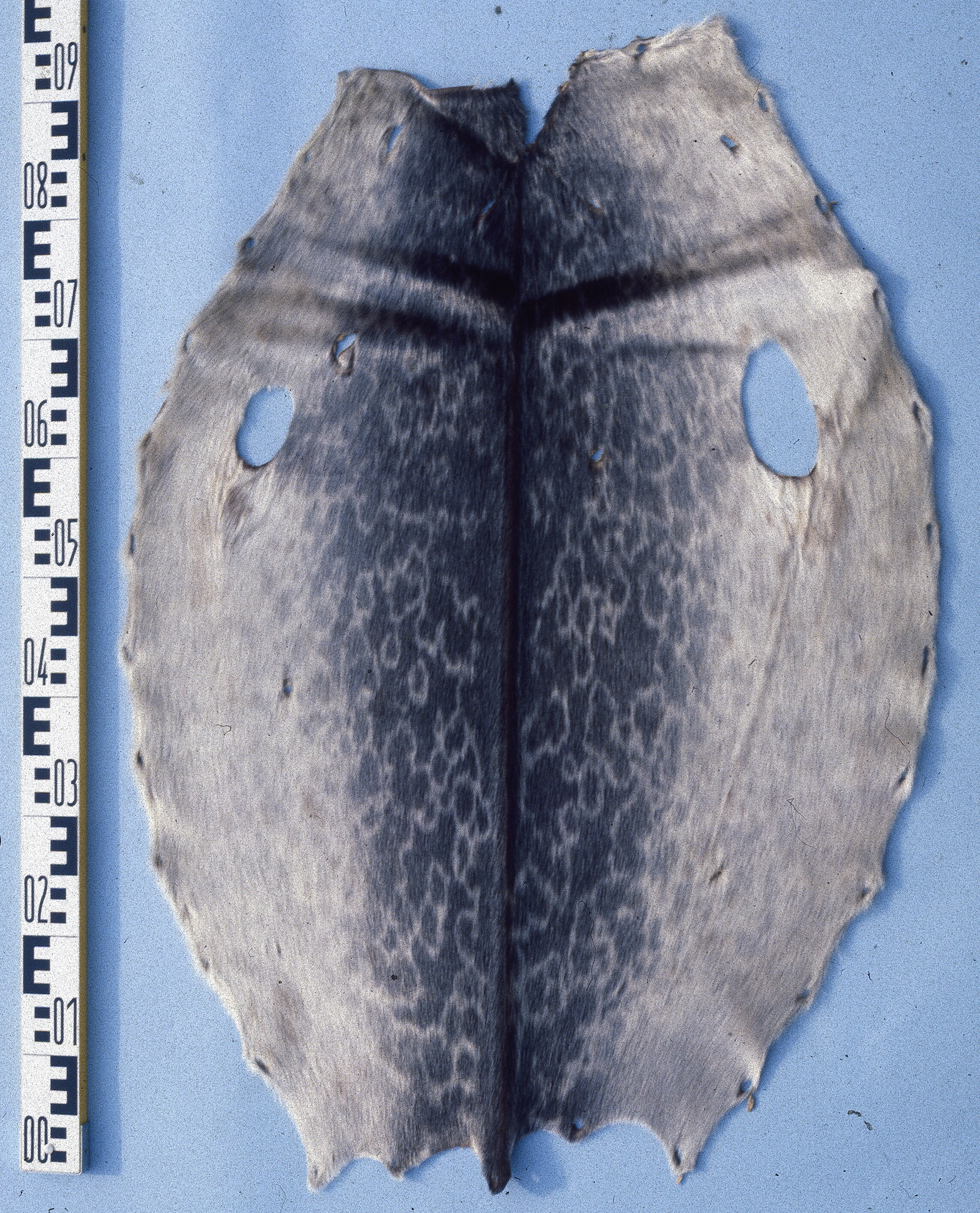
Skin of the ringed seal.

Evidence of human hunting of ringed seals dates to the Middle Paleolithic, as ringed seal limb bones were excavated from the Neanderthal site at Gruta da Figueira Brava, in Portugal, from layers dated to the Last Interglacial-Last Glacial Period transition.

Ringed seals have long been an important component of the diet of Arctic indigenous peoples throughout their range, and continue to be harvested annually by many communities. Early Paleoeskimo sites in Arctic Canada revealed signs of harvested ringed seals dating from c. 4000–3500 BP, likely captured in frozen cracks and leads in the ice, with a selection for juveniles and young adults.

In 2012 the Government of Nunavut warned pregnant women to avoid eating ringed seal liver due to elevated levels of mercury, although they stressed eating traditional "country food" is still healthy for adults.

Bycatch in fishing gear, such as commercial trawls, is a threat to ringed seals. Climate change is potentially the most serious threat to ringed seal populations since much of their habitat is dependent upon pack ice.

=== Conservation in the United States ===
The estimated population size for the Alaska stock of ringed seals is 249,000 animals. In 2010 the trend in numbers for this population was unknown. Ringed seals are listed as a species of "least concern" by the IUCN, and were considered 'not threatened' under the Endangered Species Act in 2006. Reliable estimates of the minimum population, potential biological removal, and human-caused mortality were not available in 2006. The level of annual U.S. commercial fishery-related mortality or injury was considered insignificant. The Alaska stock of ringed seals is not considered a strategic fishery stock. In 2008 the US National Marine Fisheries Service began a conservation status review under the Endangered Species Act (ESA) to determine if listing this seal under the ESA is warranted.

== Climate change ==
Ringed seals reside within 35°N and the North Pole, and are thus known as a circumpolar based species. Climate change is projected to affect both polar regions more than anywhere else. This means a changing climate and life for all those residing in these polar regions. As for ringed seals, two potential outcomes lie ahead in this ever-changing climate.

=== Threats ===
In the past decade, the Arctic region has faced some of its highest temperatures within the instrumental record. Furthermore, within the past 2000 years, summer temperature highs have never been harsher, based on paleo-climate reconstructions. This warming is due to climate feedback mechanisms based on sea-ice melt. As sea ice melts, it frees up more open ocean water to be further heated, thus bringing about a positive feedback. Ocean water retains more heat than sea ice; additionally the albedo of sea ice is much higher than that of ocean water. Ringed seals require sea ice to live and reproduce. They live most of their lives alone, only grouping together into colonies when they are on sea ice to molt, mate, or rest. Without access to sea ice, ringed seals are unable to sustain life, which further affects trophic levels both above and below. Research has shown, due to the anthropogenic effects causing the earth to warm and sea ice to melt, ringed seal density has been affected.Ringed seals are both predators and prey. A predator to zooplankton and fish, the ringed seal is considered a primary consumer as well as a secondary consumer. But the tertiary consumer, or top predator, in the Arctic is the polar bear, feeding mostly on seals, including the ringed seal. Yet through further exploration, the potential fates of this Arctic food web seem to be ambiguous, leading to a very important trade off of polar bear mortality and ringed seal sustenance.

=== Research ===
Most research on ringed seals is focused on their requirement of sea-ice to live and reproduce. With climate change projected to occur most dramatically at the poles, the Arctic is fated to extremely change, mainly with the melting of ice and changes in snowfall. Ferguson et al. studied ringed seal recruitment in western Hudson Bay with a focus on six environmental variables, including: snow depth, snowfall, rainfall, the temperature when pups were born, North Atlantic Oscillation (NAO) mechanisms, and lastly the spring break-up. The results of Ferguson et al. determined that decreases in snowfall had a negative effect on ringed seal recruitment, most likely from the occurrence of earlier break up of sea ice. The main process driving this break up is albedo, with less snowfall and more ocean exposed the ice melts more quickly. With seal pups being forced into the water sooner due to lack of ice, recruitment numbers dropped and resulted in a downward trend of the population. Ringed seals are not the only animals that require sea-ice in the Arctic and Sub-Arctic to thrive. Trophic levels come into play in terms of the food web and the reliance of one population on another or many others for survival. Most of this research is actually studied through simulations, since this requires future projections and interactions between many population, physical ocean, and biological mechanisms. Meier et al. studied current and future projections of climate in regards to sea-ice in the Baltic Sea by means of atmosphere-ocean models. Firstly, the ringed seal relies on sea-ice for breeding and is unable to breed on land, meaning, as ice melts away in the future, breeding grounds will become much scarcer. Only one bay, Bothnia Bay in the Baltic Sea, will be able to be used by ringed seals for breeding, vastly limiting their options. Ringed seals are only able to be successful with strained conditions in areas of 90%-100% ice cover probability. (Meier et al. 2004) The changes in ice scarcity projected for the future seem to greatly hinder the ability for ringed seals to reproduce in the Baltic Sea. Hoover et al. looked at multiple marine populations in the Hudson Bay while factoring in both simulated current and higher harvest rates, ultimately determining that ringed seals are identified to increase in population. This is mostly due to the decrease in polar bear populations, the main predator to the ringed seal. Even with a doubling of harvest rates and under the high (A1B) climate scenario, the ringed seals were determined to thrive even more. Hoover et al. further determined that the ringed seal's large presence as a circumpolar population along with unspecialized feeding makes the ringed seal less sensitive compared with other Arctic land and marine species. One of the final general conclusions made by Hoover et al. stated that while many current harvested populations will decrease with proposed climate change, ringed seals should be considered for redirecting harvest towards their populations.

In the Hudson Bay, Canada, the body conditions of ringed seals were observed from 2003-2013. Aerial surveys showed a decline in ringed seal density, with the lowest occurrence of seals in 2013. The lower ice coverage means more open water swimming for the ringed seals, which caused higher stress (cortisol) rates. Low ovulation rate, low pregnancy rate, fewer pups in the Inuit harvest, and observations of sick seals was also seen over the course of the study.

=== In context ===
The ringed seal is a very important link in the food chain, separating primary producers from primary predators. Historically the ringed seal was the most abundant of any other seals in the Arctic, yet this species has had its share of population slumps. First there was over-harvesting of the ringed seal, drastically dropping numbers from about 200,000 in 1900 to only 4,000 in the 1970s. Secondly, pollution from organochlorides due to DDT and other residues caused many Arctic marine mammals including the ringed seal to become sterile. Sterility still affects many marine mammals living in the Arctic, being a mechanism of bioaccumulation within the Arctic food web. The ringed seal is not fragile considering their past, yet climate change will have the greatest population effect on the ringed seals thus far due to anthropogenic causes.

=== Future ===
The future of ringed seal populations in the Arctic and Sub Arctic is uncertain, but two main projections surface based around habitat and predators. The first projection focuses on the direct effects of climate change on sea-ice and the limited environment that it will provide the ringed seal with. The majority of past research has been focused around this main idea of quicker melting sea ice leading to lower ringed seal populations from lack of breeding areas. Yet what most research has not also taken into account is the quick drop in polar bear populations. As the main predator of ringed seals, the polar bears extinction in the coming years will allow for ringed seal populations to flourish. In the end, ringed seals are estimated to thrive with no polar bears present in the Arctic and Sub Arctic. Although this predator factor is involved with more recent research, it does not necessarily mean this will be the outcome, considering the uncertainty in such projections. Overall, ringed seals populations will fluctuate regardless of each potential outcome and climate change is certain to affect not only the ringed seal but all Arctic and Sub Arctic animal populations.
