= Noriphoca =

Noriphoca Temporal range: late Oligocene–early Miocene

Scientific classification
- Kingdom: Animalia
- Phylum: Chordata
- Class: Mammalia
- Order: Carnivora
- Parvorder: Pinnipedia
- Family: Phocidae
- Subfamily: Monachinae
- Genus: †Noriphoca; Dewaele, Lambert, and Louwye, 2018

Species
- N. gaudini (type) (Guiscardi, 1870)

Extinct genus of carnivores

Noriphoca is an extinct genus of phocid belonging to the subfamily Monachinae. It is known from the late Oligocene to early Miocene of Italy.

== Species ==
The type species of Noriphoca, N. gaudini, was originally named Phoca gaudini on the basis of a skull from late Oligocene to earliest Miocene deposits in Chiento, Italy. Later authors referred it to either Monotherium, Pristiphoca, or the physeteroid genus Paleophoca. However, it was later shown that P. gaudini cannot be referred to Monotherium as the latter was probably phocine and not monachine, and erected Noriphoca for the stem-monachine species P. gaudini.
