= Paratethyphoca =

Paratethyphoca Temporal range: Late Miocene

Scientific classification
- Kingdom: Animalia
- Phylum: Chordata
- Class: Mammalia
- Infraclass: Placentalia
- Order: Carnivora
- Parvorder: Pinnipedia
- Family: Phocidae
- Subfamily: Phocinae
- Genus: †Paratethyphoca
- Species: †P. libera

Binomial name
- †Paratethyphoca libera Otriazhyi et al., 2025

Extinct genus of seals

Paratethyphoca is an extinct genus of phocine phocid that lived during the Late Miocene.

== Distribution ==
Paratethyphoca libera is known from Moldova.
