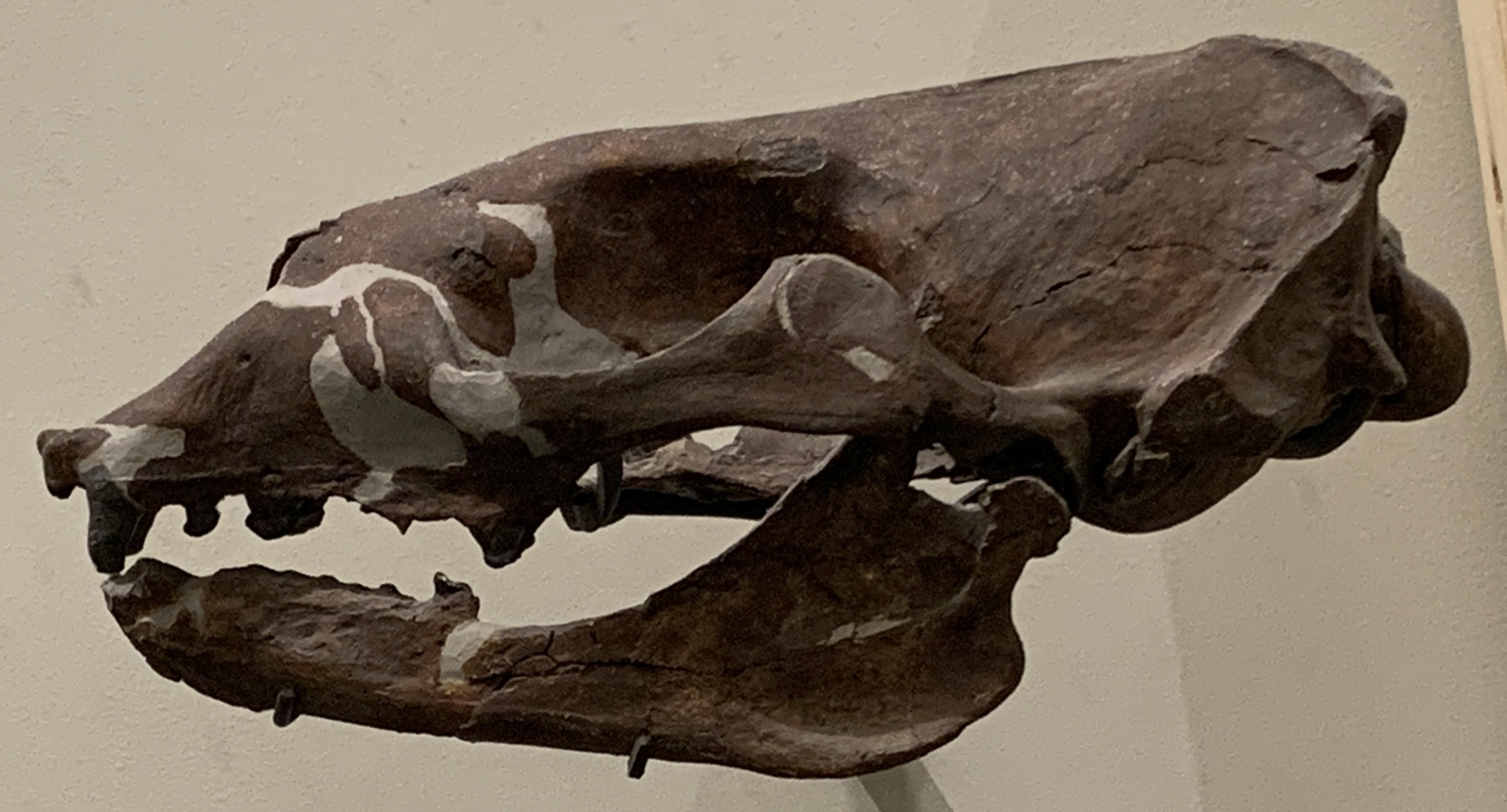
- Piscophoca pacifica skull cast of a specimen from Peru. At the AMNH.

Scientific classification
- Kingdom: Animalia
- Phylum: Chordata
- Class: Mammalia
- Order: Carnivora
- Parvorder: Pinnipedia
- Family: Phocidae
- Subfamily: Monachinae
- Genus: †Piscophoca; Muizon, 1981
- Species: †P. pacifica

Binomial name
- †Piscophoca pacifica Muizon, 1981

= Piscophoca =

Piscophoca Temporal range: Late Miocene ~11–6 Ma

Extinct genus of carnivores

Piscophoca is an extinct genus of pinniped. The genus was named after the fossiliferous Pisco Formation in Peru, where the holotype was found. Other fossils of the genus were found in the Bahía Inglesa Formation of the Caldera Basin in Chile.

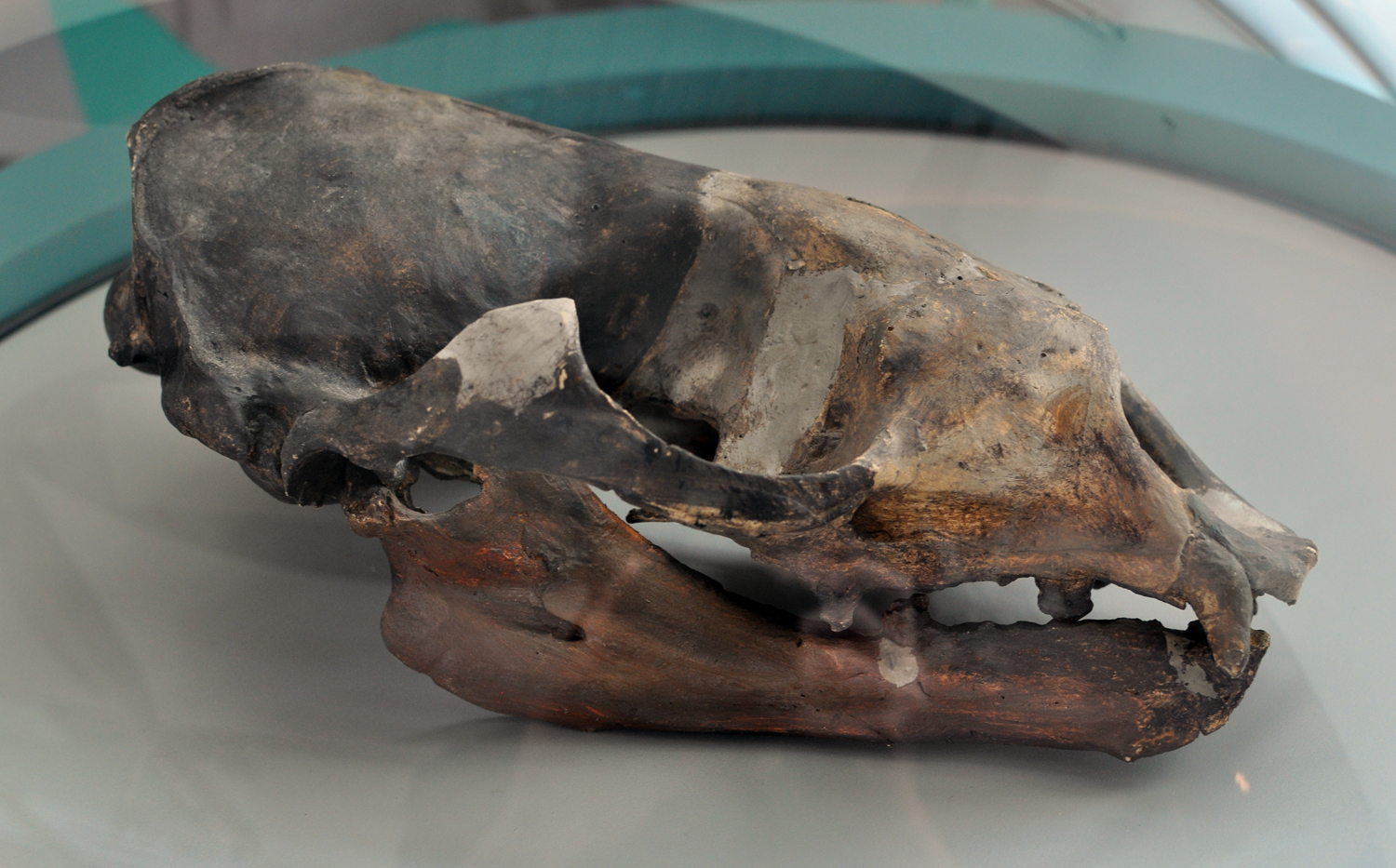
Piscophoca sp. skull
