= Gryphoca =

Gryphoca Temporal range: Miocene–Pliocene

Scientific classification
- Kingdom: Animalia
- Phylum: Chordata
- Class: Mammalia
- Order: Carnivora
- Parvorder: Pinnipedia
- Family: Phocidae
- Subfamily: Phocinae
- Tribe: Phocini
- Genus: †Gryphoca van Beneden, 1876

Species
- G. similis van Beneden, 1876 (type species); G. nordica Koretsky, Rahmat, and Peters, 2014

Extinct genus of carnivores

Gryphoca is an extinct genus of earless seals from Neogene marine deposits in the North Sea basin.

== Fossils ==
There are two recognized species of Gryphoca, G. similis and G. nordica. G. similis is known from Pliocene marine deposits in the Antwerp region of Belgium, while fossils of P. nordica have been found in the Tortonian-age Gram Formation in Denmark.
