= Platyphoca =

Platyphoca Temporal range: Miocene–Pliocene

Scientific classification
- Kingdom: Animalia
- Phylum: Chordata
- Class: Mammalia
- Order: Carnivora
- Parvorder: Pinnipedia
- Family: Phocidae
- Subfamily: Phocinae
- Tribe: Erignathini
- Genus: †Platyphoca van Beneden, 1876

Species
- P. vulgaris van Beneden, 1876 (type species); P. danica Koretsky, Rahmat, and Peters, 2014

Extinct genus of carnivores

Platyphoca is an extinct genus of earless seals from Neogene marine deposits in the North Sea basin.

== Fossils ==
There are two recognized species of Platyphoca, P. vulgaris and P. danica. P. vulgaris is known from Pliocene marine deposits in the Antwerp region of Belgium, while fossils of P. danica have been found in the Tortonian-age Gram Formation in Denmark.
