= Monotherium =

Monotherium Temporal range: Miocene

Scientific classification
- Kingdom: Animalia
- Phylum: Chordata
- Class: Mammalia
- Order: Carnivora
- Parvorder: Pinnipedia
- Family: Phocidae
- Genus: †Monotherium van Beneden, 1874

Species
- M. delognii (type) van Beneden, 1874

Extinct genus of carnivores

Monotherium is an extinct genus of phocid belonging to the subfamily Monachinae. It is known from fossils found in the middle to late Miocene of Belgium.

== Species ==
The type and only species of Monotherium is M. delognii, described from the Tortonian-age Diest Formation of Antwerp, Belgium, on the basis of the lectotype pelvis IRSNB 1153-M257a, b.

Monotherium affine and M. aberratum were previously assigned to this genus, as well as "Phoca" gaudini, but the former two are now considered a distinct genus, Frisiphoca, while gaudini has been renamed Noriphoca. The middle Miocene phocid "Phoca" wymani Leidy, 1853 was assigned to Monotherium by Ray (1976), but was considered a monachine of uncertain affinities.
