= Kawas benegasorum =

Kawas benegasorum Temporal range: Mid Miocene 14–12 Ma

Scientific classification
- Kingdom: Animalia
- Phylum: Chordata
- Class: Mammalia
- Order: Carnivora
- Parvorder: Pinnipedia
- Family: Phocidae
- Genus: †Kawas; Cozzuol, 2001
- Species: †K. benegasorum

Binomial name
- †Kawas benegasorum Cozzuol, 2001

Extinct species of pinniped

Kawas is an extinct genus of phocid from the Miocene of Argentina. It contains a single species known as Kawas benegasorum.

== Etymology ==
Kawas comes from the Tehuelche language and is the feminine form of 'Kawa' (elephant seal). 'Kawas' can also be translated to mean 'mermaid'.

== Description ==
Kawas was described from an articulated partial skeleton that has been dated to the middle Miocene around 12-14 million years ago. The skeleton is notable by the fact that it shares features in common with "northern hemisphere" seals (Phocinae) then it does other seals from the southern hemisphere, all traditionally placed in the subfamily Monachinae. This may suggest the Monachinae is paraphyletic.

Another notable aspect of Kawas is the discovery of preserved gut content, which indicate a diet primarily of bony fish. It is one of only two fossil pinnipeds with preserved content.
