= Pachyphoca =

Pachyphoca Temporal range: Miocene

Scientific classification
- Kingdom: Animalia
- Phylum: Chordata
- Class: Mammalia
- Order: Carnivora
- Parvorder: Pinnipedia
- Family: Phocidae
- Subfamily: Phocinae
- Tribe: Cystophorini
- Genus: †Pachyphoca; Koretsky and Rahmat, 2013

Species
- P. ukrainica Koretsky and Rahmat, 2013 (type species); P. chapskii Koretsky and Rahmat, 2013; P. volkodavi Tarasenko, 2022

Extinct genus of carnivores

Pachyphoca is an extinct genus of earless seals from Neogene marine deposits in the northern part of the Paratethys basin.

== Description ==
There are three recognized species of Pachyphoca: P. ukrainica, P. volkodavi, and P. chapskii. Both P. ukrainica and P. chapskii have been found in Serravallian-Tortonian-aged marine deposits in Ukraine. P. volkodavi, the newest of the three species to be discovered, were discovered from seal remains from Upper Miocene deposits in the Republic of Adygea. Pachyphoca ukrainica was the smaller of the two species, and shows more adaptations for terrestrial locomotion compared to the larger P. chapskii.

The aforementioned species of the genus Pachyphoca exhibited thick and dense bones that are characteristic of pachyosteosclerosis. It is believed that seals with such an adaptation dive to shallow depths and swim slowly allowing them to hunt slow moving bottom preys.
