= Tupiq =

Sealskin or caribou tent used by Inuit

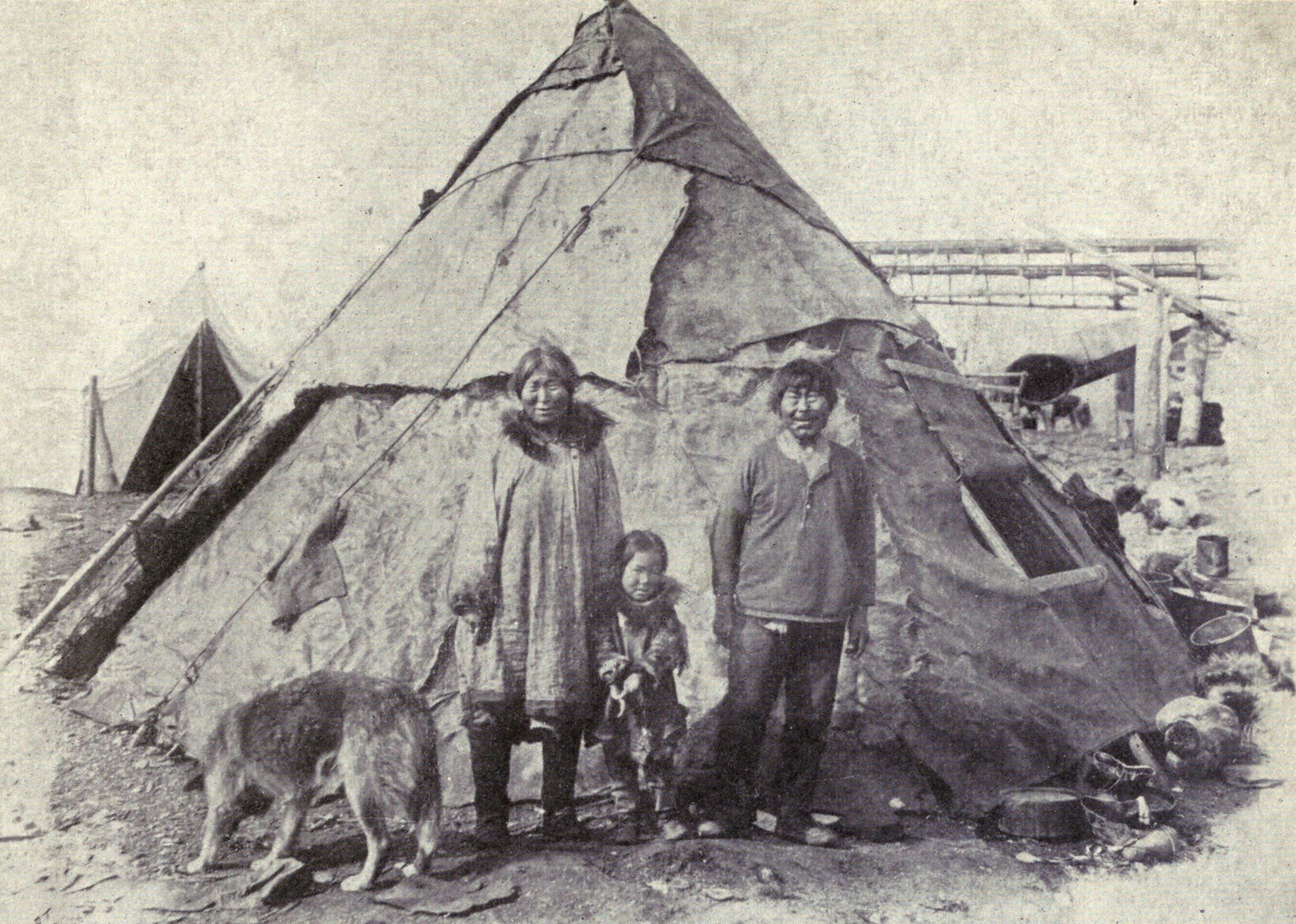
Inuit family with Malamute outside a tupik, ca. 1915

The tupiq (dual: tupiik, plural: tupiit, Inuktitut syllabics: ᑐᐱᖅ) is a traditional Inuit tent made from seal or caribou skin. An Inuk was required to kill five to ten ugjuk (bearded seals) to make a sealskin tent. When a man went hunting he would bring a small tent made out of five ugjuit. A family tent would be made of ten or more ugjuit.

== Fabrication and use ==
After the bearded seal is killed, its fat is scraped off, then the skin is stretched to dry. Finally, women will sew it together to make a tent. Layers can be added by laying heather on top of the outer skin and wrapping another skin around the tent.

The tupiq was used on the land that was not on sea ice or snow. It was portable for travel and lasted several years. When stored over the winter, the tupiq had to be kept away from dogs. In the summer the tupiq was used as shelter, then in the fall when it got colder, the Inuit moved into a qarmaq, a type of sod house, and the tupiq was used for the roof. In winter, the Inuit lived in igluit when the snow was good enough to build them. Then in the spring when the iglu melted, they moved back into the tupiq.

The tupiq was important traditionally, but is rarely used in modern times. Today most Inuit use canvas tents called tupikhaq.
