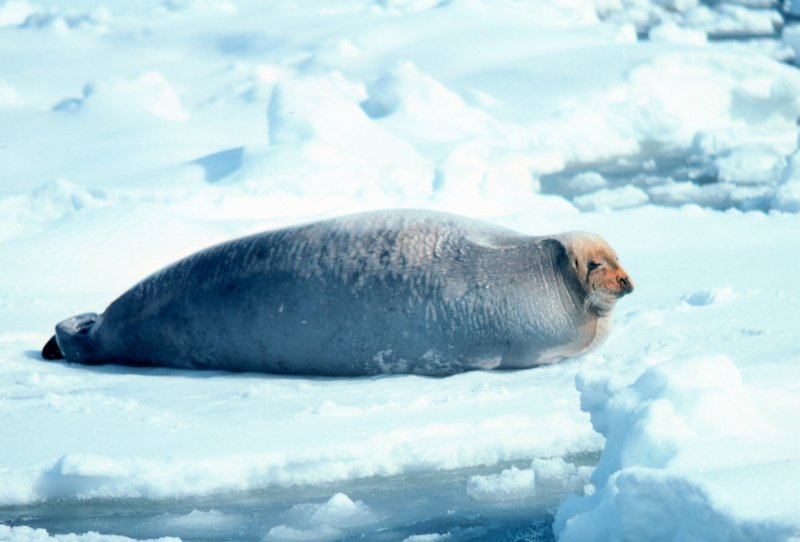

Conservation status
- Near Threatened (IUCN 3.1)

Scientific classification
- Kingdom: Animalia
- Phylum: Chordata
- Class: Mammalia
- Order: Carnivora
- Parvorder: Pinnipedia
- Family: Phocidae
- Subfamily: Phocinae
- Tribe: Erignathini
- Genus: Erignathus; Gill, 1866
- Species: E. barbatus

Binomial name
- Erignathus barbatus Erxleben, 1777
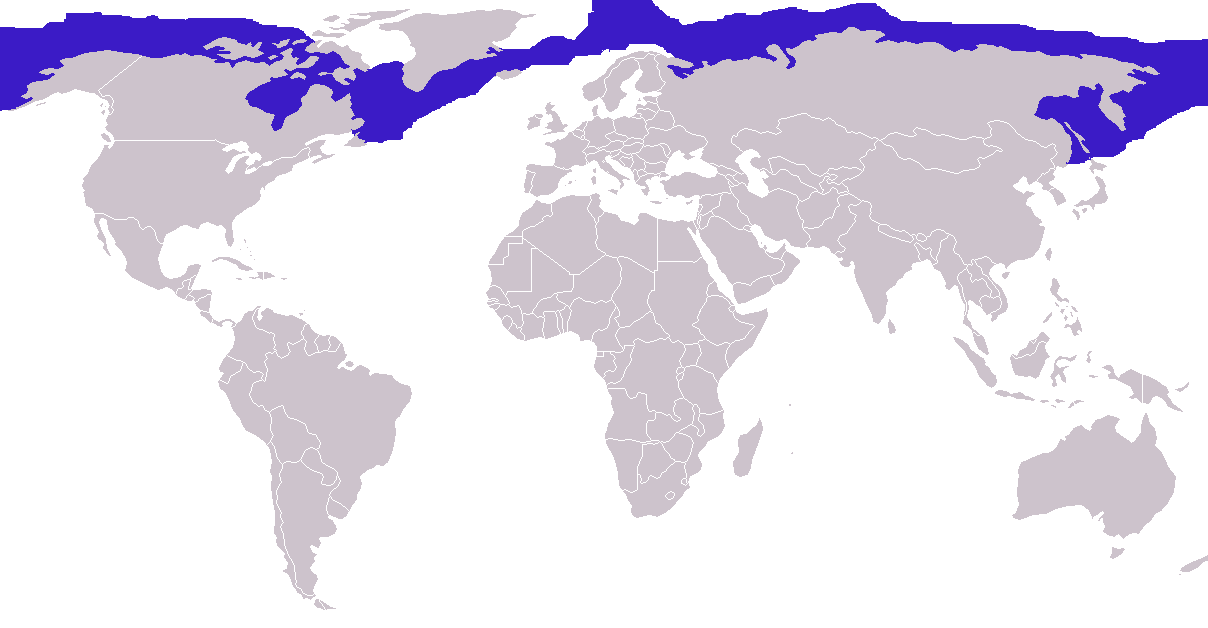
- Distribution of bearded seal

= Bearded seal =

Species of Arctic dwelling marine mammal

The bearded seal (Erignathus barbatus), also known as the square-flipper seal, is a medium-sized pinniped that is found in and near to the Arctic Ocean. It gets its generic name from two Greek words (eri and gnathos) that refer to its heavy jaw. The other part of its Linnaean name means bearded and refers to its most characteristic feature, the conspicuous and abundant whiskers. When dry, these whiskers curl elegantly, giving the bearded seal a "raffish" look.

Bearded seals are the largest northern phocid. They have been found to weigh as much as 300 kg (660 lb), with the females being the largest. However, male and female bearded seals are not very dimorphic.

The only member of the genus Erignathus, the bearded seal is unique in that it is intermediate in characteristics between the two subfamilies in the family Phocidae: Phocinae and Monachinae.

Fossils first described in 2002 indicate that, during the Pleistocene epoch, bearded seals ranged as far south as South Carolina.

== Description ==
Distinguishing features of this earless seal include square fore flippers and thick bristles on its muzzle. Adults are greyish-brown in colour, darker on the back, rarely with a few faint spots on the back or dark spots on the sides. Occasionally the face and neck are reddish brown. Bearded seal pups are born with a greyish-brown natal fur with scattered patches of white on the back and head. The bearded seal is unique in the subfamily Phocinae in having two pairs of teats, a feature it shares with monk seals.

Bearded seals reach about 2.1 to 2.7 m (6.9 to 8.9 ft) in nose-to-tail length and from 200 to 430 kg (441 to 948 lb) in weight. The female seal is larger than the male. The body fat content of a bearded seal is about 25–40%.

== Ecology ==
Bearded seals, along with ringed seals, are a major food source for polar bears. Typically pups up to around the age of 2 years are attacked, often as newborns within their birthing lairs, leaving older juveniles and adults commonly unharmed. Killer whales also prey on these seals, sometimes overturning ice floes to reach them. Walruses may eat these seals, mainly pups, but such predation is rare.

== Distribution ==
Bearded seals are extant in Arctic and Subarctic regions. In the Pacific region, they extend from the Chukchi Sea in the Arctic south into the Bering Sea where they span from Bristol Bay on the Alaskan coast to the Sea of Okhotsk on the Russian coast, up to but not including the northern coast of Japan. In the Arctic Ocean, they are found along the northern coasts of Russia, Norway, Canada, and Alaska, including the Norwegian archipelago of Svalbard and Canadian Arctic Archipelago. In the Atlantic, bearded seals are found along the northern coast of Iceland, the east and west coasts of Greenland and the Canadian mainland as far south as Labrador.

Although the range typically only extends down into Subarctic areas, bearded seals have been seen in Japan and China, as well as far south of their range in Germany, Netherlands, United Kingdom, France, Spain and Portugal.

== Hunting and diet ==
Primarily benthic, bearded seals feed on a variety of small prey found along the ocean floor, including clams, squid, crustaceans, and fish. Their whiskers serve as feelers in the soft bottom sediments. Adults favor shallow coastal areas no more than 300 m (980 ft) deep. Pups up to one year old, however, will dive as deep as 450 m (1,480 ft). Flatfishes (such as American plaice), sculpins, and Arctic cod made up most of their summer diet. Sculpin were found to be the largest fish consumed by the seals. The seals also feed in summer on invertebrates such as anemones, sea cucumbers, and polychaete worms. Bearded seals are capable of preying on pelagic and demersal fish in addition to their benthic prey.

== Reproduction and lifecycle ==
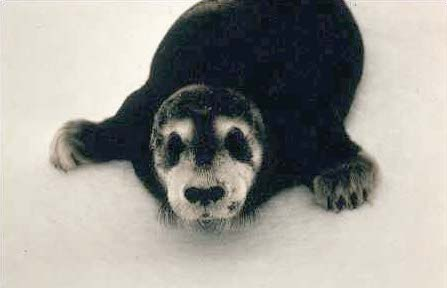
Bearded seal pup

Bearded seals give birth in the spring. In the Canadian Arctic, seal pupping occurs in May. In Svalbard, bearded seals reach sexual maturity at 5 or 6 years of age. Further south, in Alaska, most pups are born in late April. Pups are born on small drifting ice floes in shallow waters, usually weighing around 30–40 kg (66–88 lb). They enter the water only hours after they are born, and quickly become proficient divers. Mothers care for the pups for 18–24 days, during which time the pups grow at an average rate of 3.3 kg (7.3 lb) per day. During this time, pups consume an average of 8 L (1.8 imp gal; 2.1 US gal) of milk a day. By the time they are weaned, the pups have grown to about 100 kg (220 lb).

Just before the pups are weaned, a new mating cycle takes place. Females ovulate at the end of their lactation period, but remain close to their pups, ready to defend them if necessary. During the mating season, male seals will "sing", emitting a long-drawn-out warbling note that ends in a sort of moan or sigh. This sound may attract females, or may be used by the males to proclaim their territory or their readiness for breeding. Males occupy the same areas from one year to the next.

Like many Arctic mammals, bearded seals employ a reproductive strategy known as delayed implantation. This means that the blastocyst is not implanted for two months after fertilization, most often becoming implanted in July. Thus, the seal's total gestation period is around eleven months, though its active gestation period is nine months.

Bearded seals are believed to live up to 31 years.

== Vocalization ==
The vocalizations produced by the bearded seal are unique, possibly because their trachea is different from that of other Northern Pacific phocids. A majority of the rings in the trachea are incomplete with only a membrane attaching the two ends.

Sample of underwater bearded seal vocalizations taken using a hydrophone

The sounds of the bearded seal usually consist of a long oscillating trill lasting for a minute or more followed by a short, deep moan. This "song" is often repeated frequently. The number of call types within a population can vary geographically, with four types found in Svalbard and eleven in the Western Canadian Arctic. The most frequent sounds are trills, moans, and sweeps. A sweep can be compared to a short trill.

Bearded seals produce distinct trills from late March to late June, with a decline in rhythmicity in late May and June. This timeline coincides with their breeding and pupping season, which is from April to May. The repetitive and transmittable nature of bearded seal trills leads researchers to believe that they are utilized for communication, likely during courtship and breeding. Males use these sounds to establish mating territories and communicate their fitness, but it is likely that females produce these sounds as well.

Underwater, bearded seal trills can be heard from a distance of over 30 km (19 mi), with some types of sounds traveling farther than others. This makes it possible for one animal to communicate with another animal that is far away, although acoustic degradation does occur as the sound passes through the environment. A seal must produce a trill with a sound-pressure of at least 100 dB at 1 m (3.3 ft) in order for the sound to propagate 30 km (19 mi), meaning that bearded seals can likely produce sounds at this level.

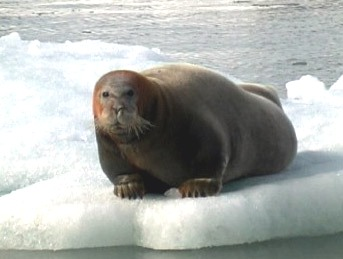
Bearded seal on ice, Svalbard

== Conservation status and subsistence hunting ==
On March 28, 2008, the U.S. National Marine Fisheries Service initiated a status review under the Endangered Species Act (ESA) to determine if listing this species under the ESA is warranted. The bearded seal is protected under the Marine Mammal Protection Act, and in October 2025 the IUCN reclassified it from "least concern" for extinction to near threatened, citing the loss of the sea ice on which Arctic seals breed and raise their pups. NOAA determined that the factors influencing any change in conservancy status of the bearded seal may include loss of sea ice by climate change, bycatch from commercial fishing gear, and hunting. Due to climate change, factors such as loss of sea ice, as well as decrease in prey population may create negative results on the bearded seal population in the future. Therefore, monitoring of the species as well as influences of human activity, will be vital to ensure species stability.

Bearded seals are an important food source for the Inuit of the Arctic coast. The Inuit language name for the seal is ugjuk (plural: ugjuit) or oogrook or oogruk. The Inuit preferred the ringed seal for food and blubber; the meat was eaten and the blubber burnt in the kudlik (stone lamp). The skin of the bearded seal is tougher than that of other seals and was used to make shoes, whips, dog sled harnesses, coverings for a wooden frame boat (the umiak) and summer tents known as tupiq.

== Subspecies ==
There are two recognized subspecies of this seal:

Image	Subspecies	Distribution
	Erignathus barbatus barbatus (Erxleben 1777) – Eastern bearded seal	
	Erignathus barbatus nauticus (Pallas 1811) – Western bearded seal	

While the validity of these subspecies has been questioned, and is not yet supported by any molecular data, analysis of the animals' calls does indicate a differentiation between different populations.

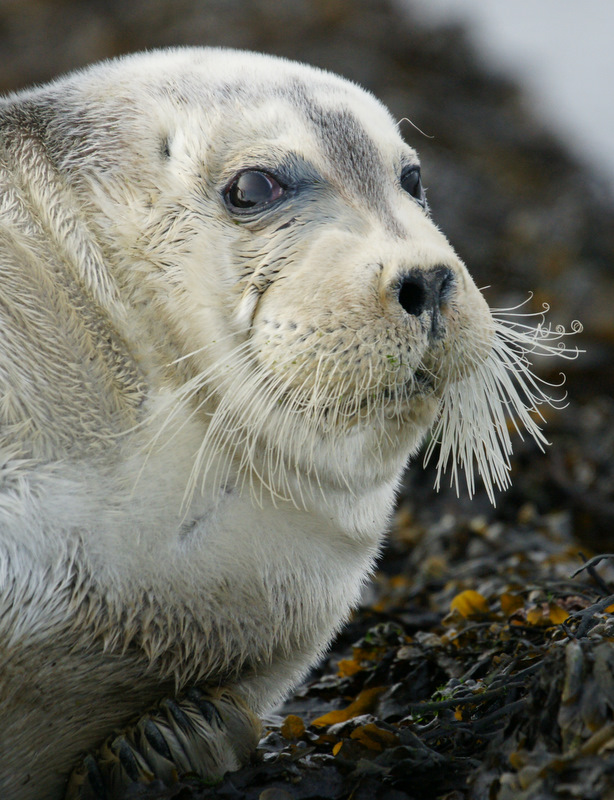
Bearded seal face

== Evolutionary history ==
Bearded seal fossils have been found to be as old as the early to mid Pleistocene. These early fossils were found in northern regions like England, Alaska, and Sweden, as well as the North Sea and the Champlain Sea.

Bearded seals, like all true seals, belong to the family Phocidae which is one of the three families in the clade Pinnipedia, along with Otariidae and Odobenidae. Pinnipeds are thought to have originated 27 to 25 million years ago during the late Oligocene period. One hypothesis for the evolution of pinnipeds is that pinnipeds are a diphyletic group and otariids and odobenids are more closely related to bears, and phocids are more closely related to mustelids like weasels. Another hypothesis suggests that pinnipeds are a monophyletic group that descended from a single ancestor. This has been more supported by phylogenetic analysis than the diphylectic hypothesis. One such study suggests that phocids are sister taxa to the common ancestor to both otariids and odobenids.

Bearded seals belong to the subfamily Phocinae (Northern Hemisphere seals). Phocinae can be further divided into three clades: Erignathini (bearded seals), Cystophorini (hooded seals), and Phocini (all remaining genera). Bearded seals are the sister taxa to the common ancestor of Cystophorini and Phocini.

== See also ==
- Tama-chan, an individual bearded seal which became a minor celebrity in Japan after being sighted in Tokyo's Tama River
