= Phocanella =

Phocanella Temporal range: Pliocene

Scientific classification
- Kingdom: Animalia
- Phylum: Chordata
- Class: Mammalia
- Order: Carnivora
- Parvorder: Pinnipedia
- Family: Phocidae
- Subfamily: Phocinae
- Genus: †Phocanella van Beneden, 1876

Species
- P. pumila van Beneden, 1876 (type species)

Extinct genus of carnivores

Phocanella is an extinct genus of earless seals from the early Pliocene of Belgium and the US Eastern Seaboard.

The type and only species of Phocanella is P. pumila. The second nominal Phocanella species, P. minor, is a synonym. Two additional taxa referred to the genus, P. couffoni and P. straeleni, are nomina dubia.
