= Praepusa =

Praepusa Temporal range: Miocene–Pliocene

Scientific classification
- Kingdom: Animalia
- Phylum: Chordata
- Class: Mammalia
- Order: Carnivora
- Parvorder: Pinnipedia
- Family: Phocidae
- Subfamily: Phocinae
- Tribe: Phocini
- Genus: †Praepusa; Kretzoi, 1941

Species
- P. pannonica Kretzoi, 1941 (type species); P. boeska Koretsky, Peters, and Rahmat, 2015; P. magyaricus Koretsky, 2003; P. tarchankutica Antoniuk and Koretsky, 1984; P. vindobonensis Toula, 1897

Extinct genus of carnivores

Praepusa is an extinct genus of earless seals from Neogene marine deposits in Europe. Five species, P. boeska, P. magyaricus, P. pannonica, P. tarchankutica and P. vindoboensis, are known.

== Description ==
Praepusa's occipital bones possess well-developed jugular processes. The canine teeth are developed, and the molars are predominantly tricuspid in form, and, like the premolars, are packed closely together. The mandible as a whole is small and thin, with a symphyseal portion that is bluntly rounded, and the chin is most prominent between premolars 3–4. The facial part of the skull is relatively low and shortened, and the mandible is more compact. The deltoid crest of the humerus is sharp, with maximal distention at its proximal end. The trochanteric fossa of the femur is wide and medially open, though deep.

== Taxonomy ==
There are five recognized species of Praepusa. P. boeska, known from Pliocene deposits in the Netherlands, is notable for being the smallest fossil seal, with a size comparable to the smallest extant seals of the genus Pusa. The other species include P. magyaricus, found in Serravallian-age deposits in Hungary, P. pannonica, known from Miocene marine deposits in the eastern Paratethys, P. tarchankutica, known from the Miocene of Ukraine, and P. vindobonensis, known from Miocene marine deposits in central and eastern Europe.
