= Nanophoca =

Nanophoca Temporal range: Miocene

Scientific classification
- Kingdom: Animalia
- Phylum: Chordata
- Class: Mammalia
- Infraclass: Placentalia
- Order: Carnivora
- Parvorder: Pinnipedia
- Family: Phocidae
- Subfamily: Phocinae
- Tribe: Phocini
- Genus: †Nanophoca; Dewaele, Amson, Lambert, and Louwye, 2017

Species
- N. vitulinoides (van Beneden, 1871) (type species)

Extinct genus of carnivores

Nanophoca is an extinct genus of earless seals from the middle Miocene of Belgium.

== Taxonomy ==
In 1871, Pierre-Joseph van Beneden erected "Phoca" vitulinoides for a maxilla, atlas, sacrum, ulna, two ankle bones, and phalanx from Miocene deposits in the Antwerp region of Belgium. In later papers, he referred some additional material to the species. van Beneden interpreted "P." vitulinoides as a close relative of the harbor seal.

The assignment of vitulinoides to Phoca was cast into doubt in two papers published in 2008 concerning fossil phocids from the North Atlantic realm. Koretsky and Ray (2008) designated the sacrum the lectotype of "P. vitulinoides but nonetheless treated the species as dubious. Based on the discovery of more complete specimens, "Phoca" vitulinoides was finally given its own generic name, Nanophoca. Because the original lectotype material is lost, the partial skeleton IRSNB M2276 has been designated the neotype.

== Biology ==
The skeletal anatomy of Nanophoca indicates that it could enhance use of its front flippers to capture prey.
