= Leptophoca =

Leptophoca Temporal range: Miocene

Scientific classification
- Kingdom: Animalia
- Phylum: Chordata
- Class: Mammalia
- Order: Carnivora
- Parvorder: Pinnipedia
- Family: Phocidae
- Subfamily: Phocinae
- Genus: †Leptophoca; True, 1906

Species
- L. proxima (van Beneden, 1876) (type species); L. amphiatlantica Koretsky, Ray, and Peters, 2012

Extinct genus of carnivores

Leptophoca is an extinct genus of earless seals from the North Atlantic realm.

== Taxonomy ==
Leptophoca lenis was coined by Frederick True for a humerus from the Calvert Formation of Maryland. Later, Clayton Ray referred "Prophoca" proxima from the Antwerp region, Belgium, to Leptophoca. A second nominal Leptophoca species, L. amphiatlantica, was coined for specimens found on both sides of the North Atlantic. A 2017 study found proxima and lenis to be the same species, rendering proxima the epithet of the Leptophoca type species, but evidence for the validity of L. amphiatlantica was deemed weak, rendering amphiatlantica a nomen dubium within Leptophoca.

== Description ==
Leptophoca is described as being similar in size to the modern-day harp seal. The humerus indicates primitive features, such as a reduced lesser tubercle, a straight diaphysis, and intermediate projection of the deltopectoral crest. A deep tendon groove in the forelimb also suggests increased manus flexion. All these features show an increased flexibility of the forelimbs, indicating that Leptophoca would mainly utilize its forelimbs for aquatic and terrestrial locomotion and aid in propulsion, braking, and steering underwater. This contrasts with extant phocids, which mainly utilized their hindlimbs for propulsion while their forelimbs were limited in flexibility. Skull features including a long rostrum and simplistic teeth indicated that Leptophoca had a feeding mechanism that indicates rapid jaw closure, which benefits a grip and tear feeding strategy for grasping and shaking prey. Leptophoca was a carnivore that fed on medium to large-sized endothermic prey which includes seabirds, large fish, and other marine organisms. Based on ecomorphotype analysis, Leptophoca most likely resided between 50-100 meters in coastal habitats over continental shelves, characterized by being sunlit and relatively warm in addition to being well mixed between winds and currents.
