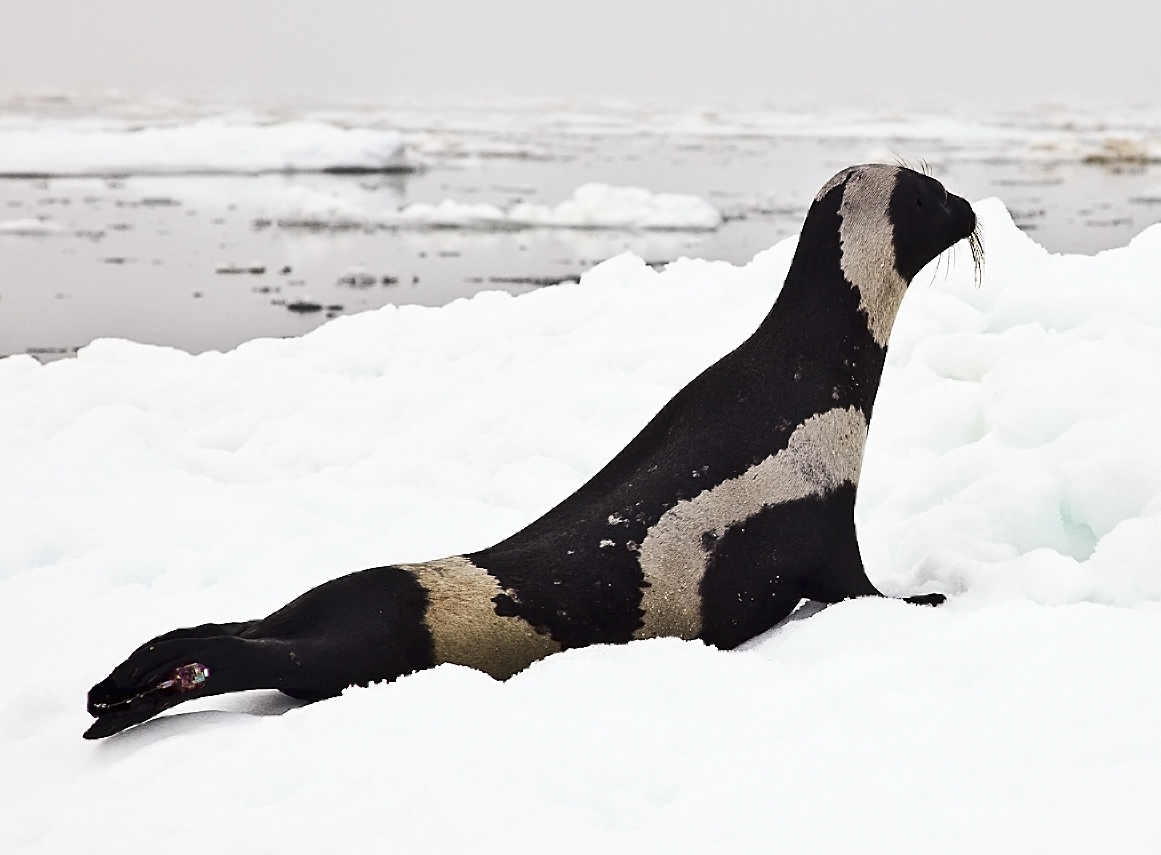

Conservation status
- Least Concern (IUCN 3.1)

Scientific classification
- Kingdom: Animalia
- Phylum: Chordata
- Class: Mammalia
- Order: Carnivora
- Parvorder: Pinnipedia
- Family: Phocidae
- Subfamily: Phocinae
- Tribe: Phocini
- Genus: Histriophoca; Gill, 1873
- Species: H. fasciata

Binomial name
- Histriophoca fasciata (Zimmermann, 1783)
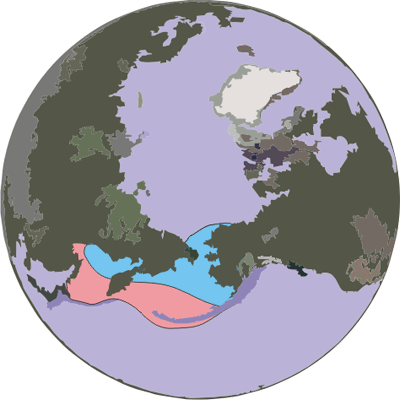
- Ribbon seal range (blue – summer, pink – maximal)

= Ribbon seal =

Species of mammal

The ribbon seal (Histriophoca fasciata) is a medium-sized pinniped from the true seal family (Phocidae). A seasonally ice-bound species, it is found in the Arctic and Subarctic regions of the North Pacific Ocean, notably in the Bering Sea and Sea of Okhotsk. It is distinguished by its striking coloration, with two wide white strips and two white circles against dark brown or black fur.

It is the only living species in the genus Histriophoca; a possible fossil species, H. alekseevi, has been described from the Miocene of Moldova.

== Description ==
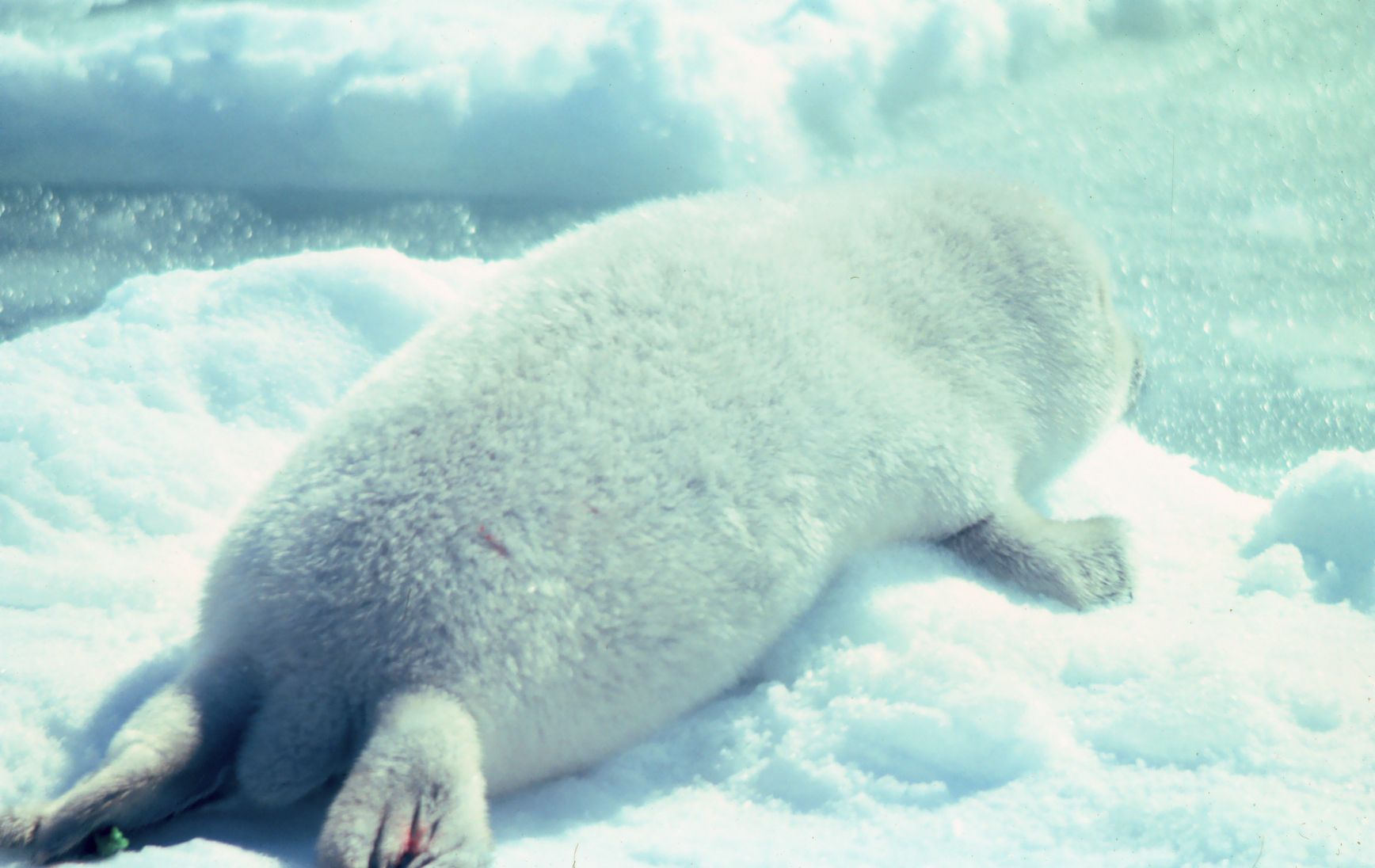
Ribbon seal pup on the ice

Adult seals are recognizable by their black skin, which carries four white markings: a strip around the neck, one around the tail and a circular marking on each body side, which encloses the front fins. The contrast is particularly strong with the males, while with females the difference in color between bright and dark portions is often less conspicuous. Newborn ribbon seal pups have white natal fur. After moulting their natal fur, their color changes to blue-grey on their backs and silvery beneath. Over the course of three years, portions of the fur become darker and others brighter after every molt, and only at the age of four years does the striped pattern emerge.

The ribbon seal has a short snout with broad, deep internal nares and large, rounded, front-facing orbits. Like other phocids, it possesses enlarged auditory bullae and lacks a sagittal crest. The ribbon seal has curved, widely spaced dentition and smaller canines than other phocid species.

The ribbon seal has a large inflatable air sac that is connected to the trachea and extends on the right side over the ribs. It is larger in males than in females, and it is thought that it is used to produce underwater vocalizations, perhaps for attracting a mate. Unlike other pinnipeds, the ribbon seal lacks the lobes that divide the lungs into smaller compartments. The ribbon seal can grow to a length of about 1.6 m (5.2 ft) and a weight of 95 kg (209 lb), with males being larger than females.

The main predators of ribbon seals include great white sharks and orcas.

=== Sexual dimorphism ===
Male ribbon seals are typically larger than females. This is particularly recognizable in their skull morphology because male nares openings are much larger than female nares openings. Larger males are hypothesized to have a better chance of reproducing with multiple females. They have a higher fitness level and win in competition with other males over females.

== Habitat ==
The ribbon seal lives in the Arctic parts of the Pacific Ocean. During winter and spring, it hauls out on pack ice to breed, molt, and give birth. During this time, it is found at the ice front in the Bering and Okhotsk Seas. During the winter and spring, the ribbon seal lives in open water, though some move south as the ice recedes with warmer temperatures. Little is known about its habit during this time, as it is so far from land and human observation. The ribbon seal is very rarely seen on shorefast ice or on land.

Thus far, there have been three acknowledged instances where ribbon seals have been found as far south as Squamish, British Columbia, Long Beach, Washington, and even further south at Morro Bay, California. There was nothing to suggest that illness was the cause of the seals appearance, as they appeared to be healthy.

== Behavior ==
Ribbon seals are rarely seen out on the ice and snow. Their method of movement on the ice is highly specialized. While quickly undulating their body in serpentine motion, they grip into the ice with their claws and use alternating flipper strokes to pull themselves across the ice's surface. It has been observed that this form of locomotion is rendered ineffective on other surfaces, most likely due to the increased friction between the animal's fur and the substrate.

While out on the ice, ribbon seals are noticeably indifferent to their surroundings. Humans in boats have been able to closely approach these seals before disturbing them. Mothers have been observed leaving pups by themselves for extended lengths of time. This would suggest that they experience little predation from land predators such as bears or humans, relative to other seals. When these seals are captured in nets, they are known to engage in feigning death behavior.

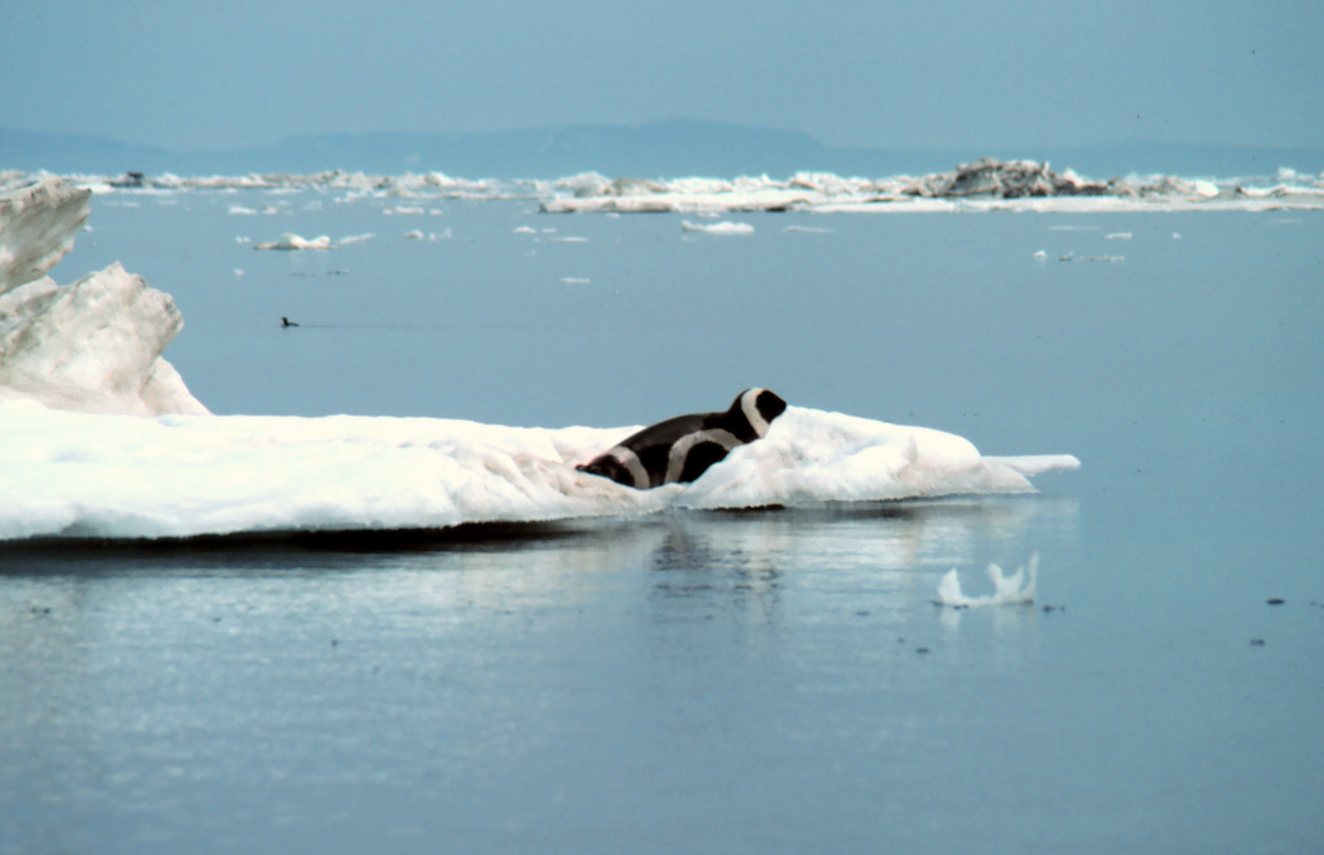
Ribbon seal

== Diet ==
The ribbon seal eats almost exclusively pelagic creatures: fish like pollock (e.g., Gadus chalcogrammus), eelpout, Arctic cod, and cephalopods such as squid (e.g., Berryteuthis magister) and octopus; young seals eat crustaceans (like shrimp) as well. The ribbon seal dives to depths of up to 200 m (660 ft) in search of food; it is solitary and forms no herds.

Ribbon seals in the Bering Sea consume pollock, eelpout, and arctic cod. Adult seals have relatively weak and smooth canines because their food does not need to be viciously torn.

== Reproduction ==
Ribbon seals have a polygynous mating system, where males mate with multiple females. Ribbon seals mate and give birth on pack ice rookeries, sea ice that is not connected to land. Males use vocalizations to defend breeding territories or to attract mates. Males become sexually mature at three to six years old; females become sexually mature between two and five years old. Breeding occurs once annually, and usually takes place in late May to June, corresponding to the loss of sea ice in spring.

After mating, the embryo does not implant directly after fertilization, instead it has delayed implantation for about two to four months. Delayed implantation allows the female to give birth when sea ice extent is greatest. Gestation lasts about ten to eleven months; one pup is born. Females care for their pup on pack ice for about four to six weeks. Their milk is high in proteins and lipids, which allows the pup to grow very quickly. A lactating mother ribbon seal does not forage for food, but must rely on fat stores in her body. After weaning the pup the mother teaches the pup how to dive to forage for prey.

Pups are born with a white lanugo (fur coat) that is shed about a month after birth. These pups do not enter the water until their lanugo is completely gone because their layer of blubber, and protection from cold ocean temperatures, remains undeveloped until shedding. Young ribbon seals were over-hunted because of their soft and dense fur coat, which caused the population to decrease.

== Protection ==
Young ribbon seals look like young harp seals, and like these, they were hunted for their fur. Since they do not form herds, ribbon seals were more difficult to catch than harp seals. Since the Soviet Union limited the hunt on ribbon seals in 1969, their population has recovered. The current population is around 250,000.

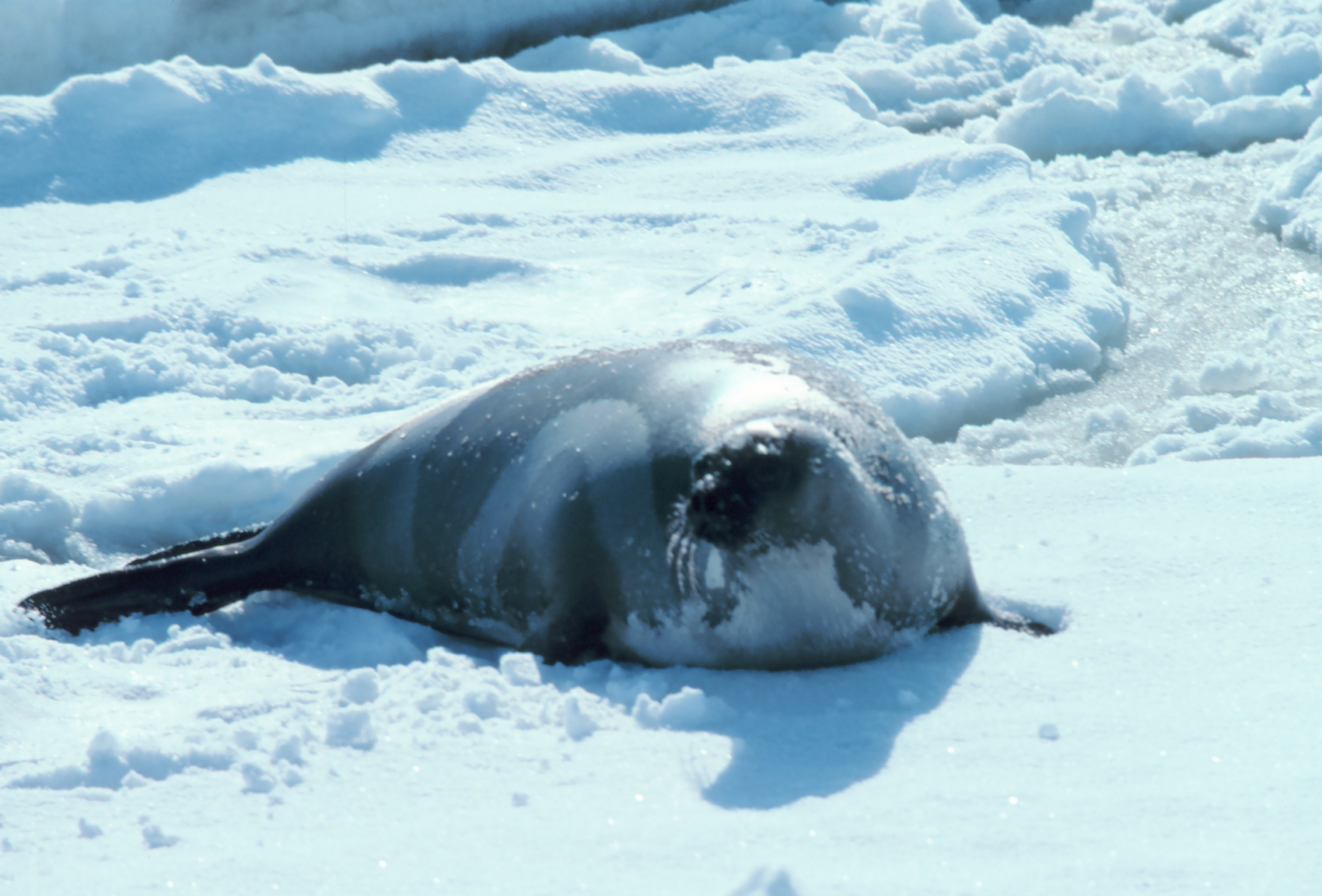

In March 2008 the US government agreed to study Alaska's ribbon seal population and considered adding it to the endangered species list. However, in December 2008, the US government decided that sea ice critical to the seals' survival will not be endangered by global warming, and declined to list the species. Instead, it became a U.S. National Marine Fisheries Service Species of Concern. The US Government's National Oceanic and Atmospheric Administration, National Marine Fisheries Service (NMFS), has some concerns regarding status and threats of some species, for which insufficient information is available to list them under the US Endangered Species Act.

In the summer of 2009 the Center for Biological Diversity filed suit to get the decision changed. On July 10, 2013, after again reviewing the status of this species, the National Marine Fisheries Service found that listing under the ESA was not warranted.
