= Frisiphoca =

Frisiphoca Temporal range: Tortonian

Scientific classification
- Kingdom: Animalia
- Phylum: Chordata
- Class: Mammalia
- Order: Carnivora
- Parvorder: Pinnipedia
- Family: Phocidae
- Subfamily: Phocinae
- Genus: †Frisiphoca; Dewaele, Lambert, and Louwye, 2018

Species
- F. aberratum (van Beneden, 1876) (type); F. affine (van Beneden, 1876)

Extinct genus of carnivores

Frisiphoca is an extinct genus of phocid belonging to the subfamily Phocinae. It is known from fossils found in the late Miocene of Belgium.

== Taxonomy ==
There are two species of Frisiphoca, F. aberratum and F. affine. Both were previously assigned to Monotherium, but Dewaele et al. (2018) found those species generically distinct from the Monotherium type species and placed them in their own genus, Frisiphoca.

== Fossils ==
Fossils of Frisiphoca aberratum and F. affine occur in the Tortonian-age Diest Formation of the vicinity of Antwerp, Belgium. Ray (1976) tentatively referred to F. aberratum a humerus from Martha's Vineyard, Massachusetts.
