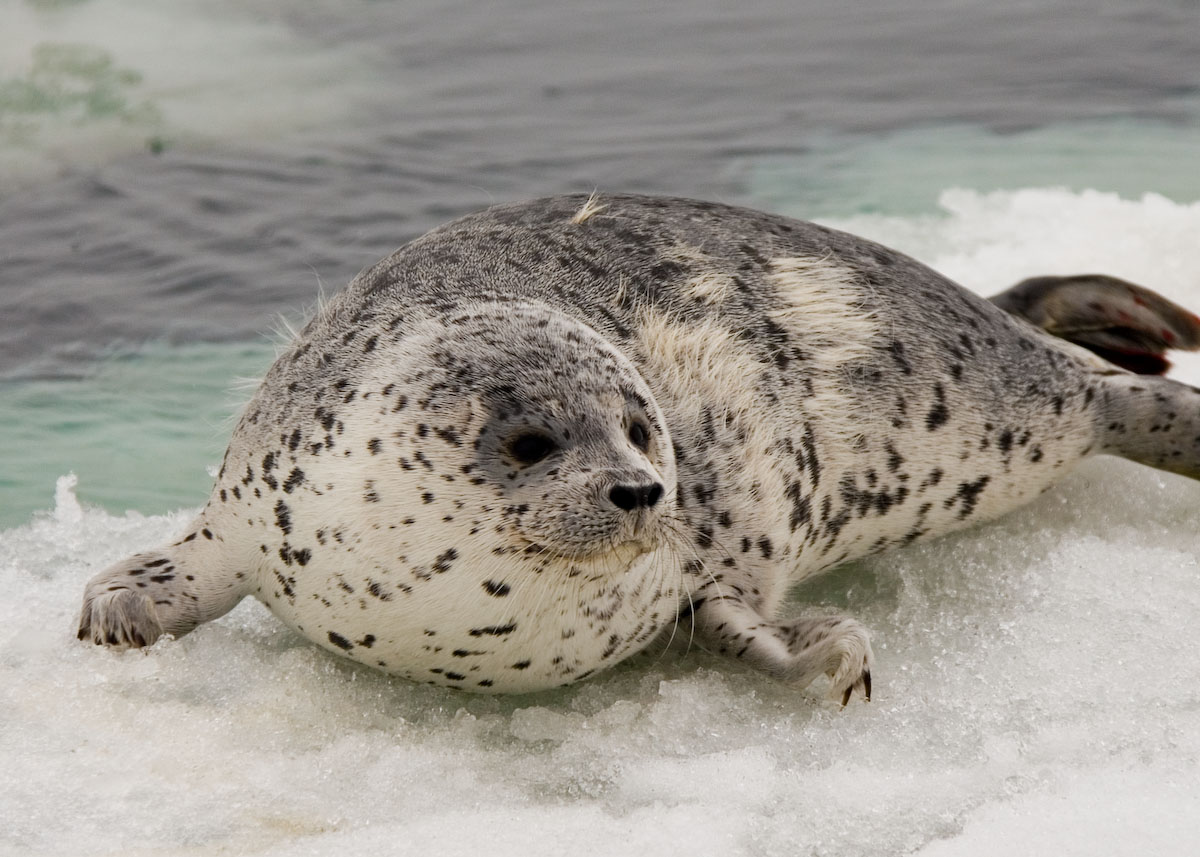
- Spotted seal, Phoca largha

Scientific classification
- Kingdom: Animalia
- Phylum: Chordata
- Class: Mammalia
- Order: Carnivora
- Parvorder: Pinnipedia
- Family: Phocidae
- Subfamily: Phocinae; Gray, 1821

Tribes and genera
- †Frisiphoca; †Leptophoca; †Cryptophoca; †Monotherium; †Prophoca; †Monachopsis; †Sarmatonectes; †Phocanella; †Kawas; Erignathini Chapski, 1955; †Platyphoca; Erignathus; Cystophorini Burns & Fay, 1970; †Miophoca; †Pachyphoca; Cystophora; Phocini J. E. Gray, 1821; †Nanophoca; Pagophilus; Histriophoca; †Gryphoca; Halichoerus; †Batavipusa; †Praepusa; Pusa; Phoca

= Phocinae =

Northern seals Temporal range: Aquitanian–present Early Miocene – Holocene

Subfamily of carnivores

Phocinae (known colloquially as "Northern seals") is a subfamily of Phocidae whose distribution is found in the seas surrounding the Holarctic, with the Baikal seal (Pusa sibirica) being one of the world's only freshwater species of pinniped. What distinguishes them from other phocid seals is the presence of well-developed claws on their front and back flippers. The Phocinae is divided into three extant tribes: Erignathini (represented by the sole extant bearded seal Erignathus barbatus), Cystophorini (another extant monotypic tribe represented by hooded seal Cystophora cristata), and Phocini (represented by the rest of the other surviving species in the subfamily). Members of both Erignathini and Cystophorini have 34 chromosomes, while species in the tribe Phocini have 32 chromosomes.

Below is a composite phylogeny of the phocine genera after Berta & Churchill (2012), Dewaele et al. (2018), and Koretsky & Rahmat (2013):

- Phocinae
  - †Frisiphoca
  - - - †Leptophoca
      - - †Cryptophoca
        - - †Monotherium
          - - †Prophoca
            - - †Monachopsis
              - - †Sarmatonectes
                - †Phocanella
    - - †Kawas
      - - Erignathini
          - †Platyphoca
          - Erignathus
        - - Cystophorini
            - †Miophoca
            - - †Pachyphoca
              - Cystophora
          - Phocini
            - †Nanophoca
            - - - Pagophilus
                - Histriophoca
              - - †Gryphoca
                - - Halichoerus
                  - - Phoca
                    - - †Batavipusa
                      - - †Praepusa
                        - Pusa
