= List of the Cenozoic life of Oregon =

This list of the Cenozoic life of Oregon contains the various prehistoric life-forms whose fossilized remains have been reported from within the US state of Oregon and are between 66 million and 10,000 years of age.

== A ==
- Abies
  - †Abies chaneyi
  - †Abies sonomensis
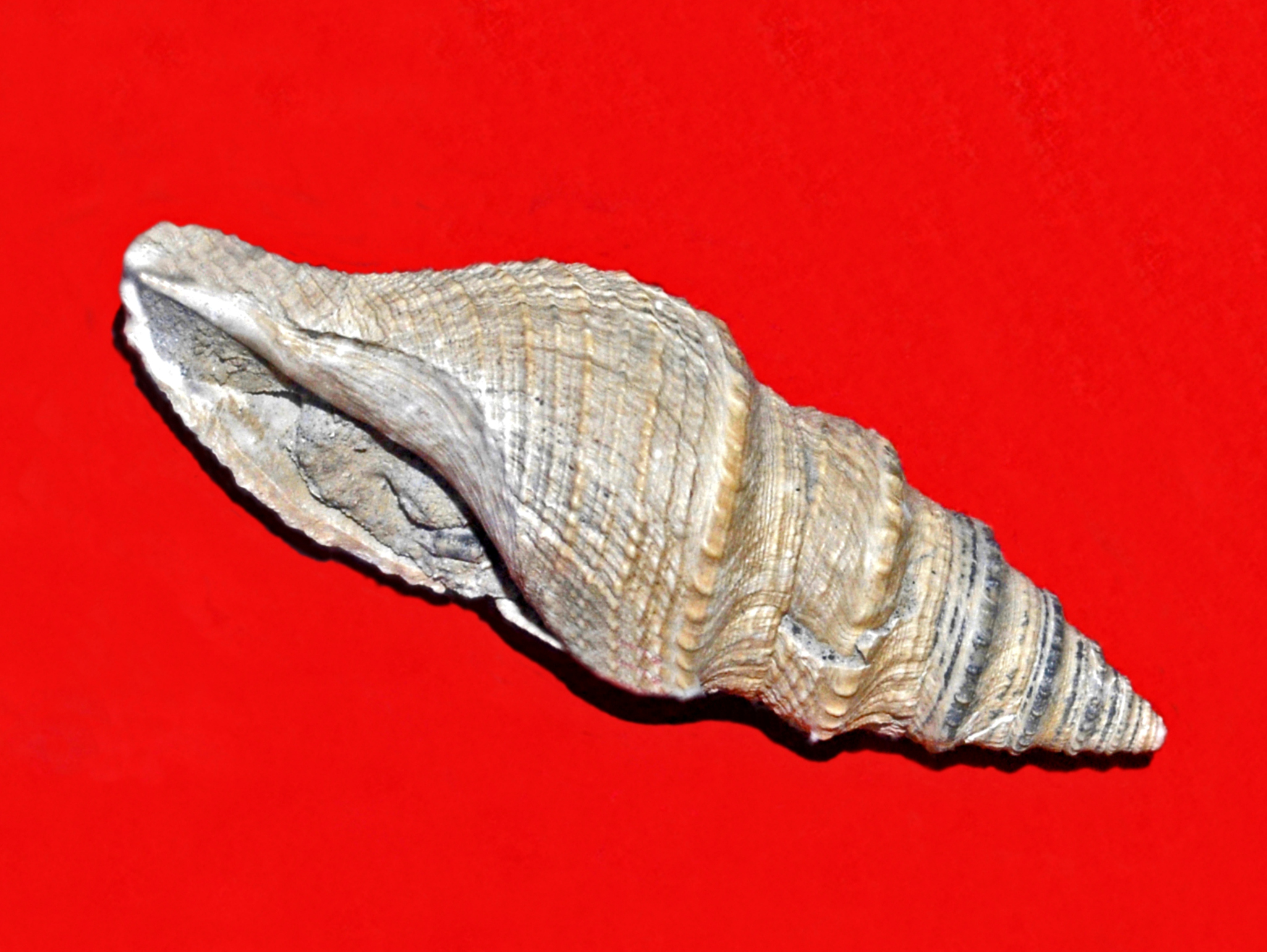
- Shell of an Acamptogenotia sea snail
  †Acamptogenotia
  - †Acamptogenotia nodulosa
  - †Acamptogenotia tessellata
- Acanthocardia
  - †Acanthocardia brewerii
- Acer
  - †Acer ashwillii
  - †Acer cranei
  - †Acer glabroides
  - †Acer kluckingii
  - †Acer manchesteri
  - †Acer oligomedianum
  - †Acer osmonti
  - †Acer osmontii
- †Acericecis
  - †Acericecis chaneyi – type locality for species
- †Achaenodon
  - †Achaenodon fremdi – type locality for species
- †Achlyoscapter
  - †Achlyoscapter longirostris
- Acila
  - †Acila conradi
  - †Acila decisa
  - †Acila gettysburgensis
  - †Acila nehalemensis
  - †Acila shumardi
  - †Acila trilineata
- Acmaea
  - †Acmaea vokesi
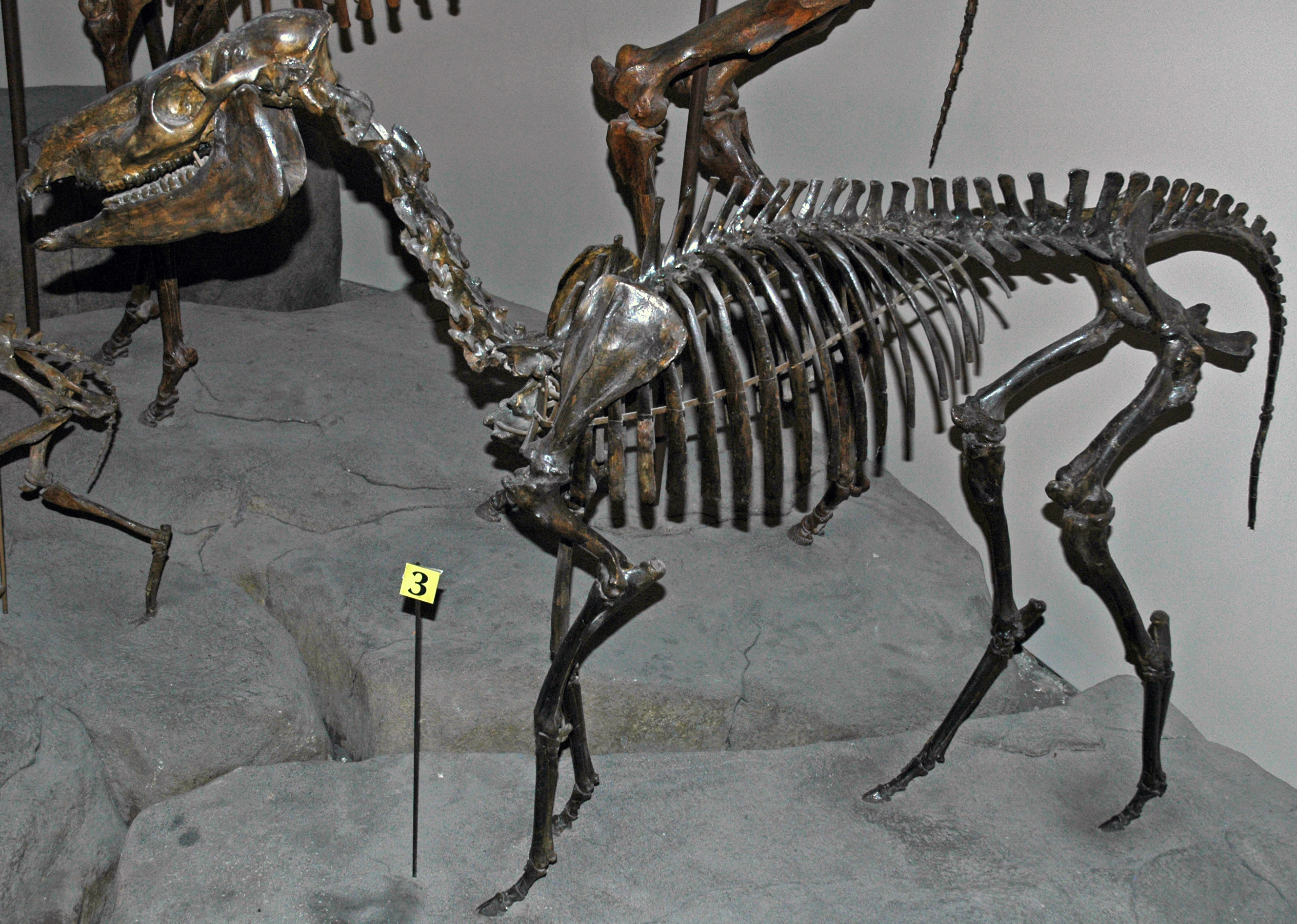
- Mounted fossilized skeleton of the Miocene horse Acritohippus
  †Acritohippus
  - †Acritohippus isonesus
- Acteon
  - †Acteon chehalisensis
  - †Acteon parvum
- †Actinidia
  - †Actinidia oregonensis
- †Acutostrea
  - †Acutostrea idriaensis
- †Adeloblarina
  - †Adeloblarina berklandi
- Admete
  - †Admete umbilicata
- Aechmophorus
  - †Aechmophorus occidentalis
- †Aesculus
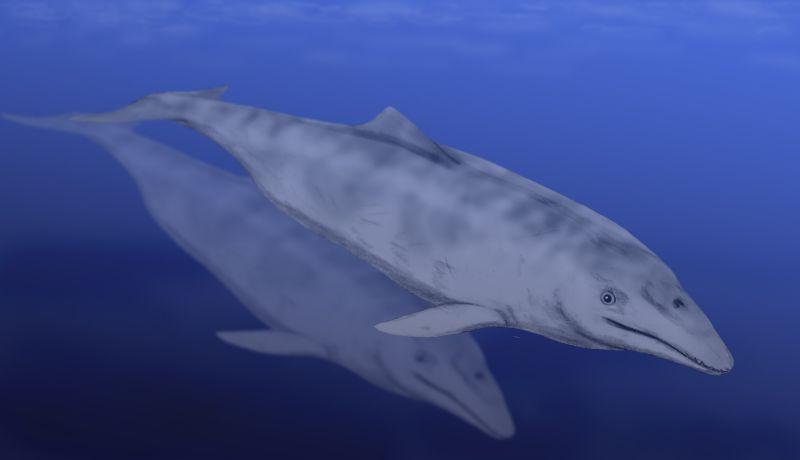
- Life restoration of the Oligocene baleen whale Aetiocetus
  †Aetiocetus – type locality for genus
  - †Aetiocetus cotylalveus – type locality for species
  - †Aetiocetus weltoni – type locality for species
- Aforia
  - †Aforia campbelli
  - †Aforia clallamensis – or unidentified comparable form
- †Agasoma
  - †Agasoma gravidum
- Agelaius – tentative report
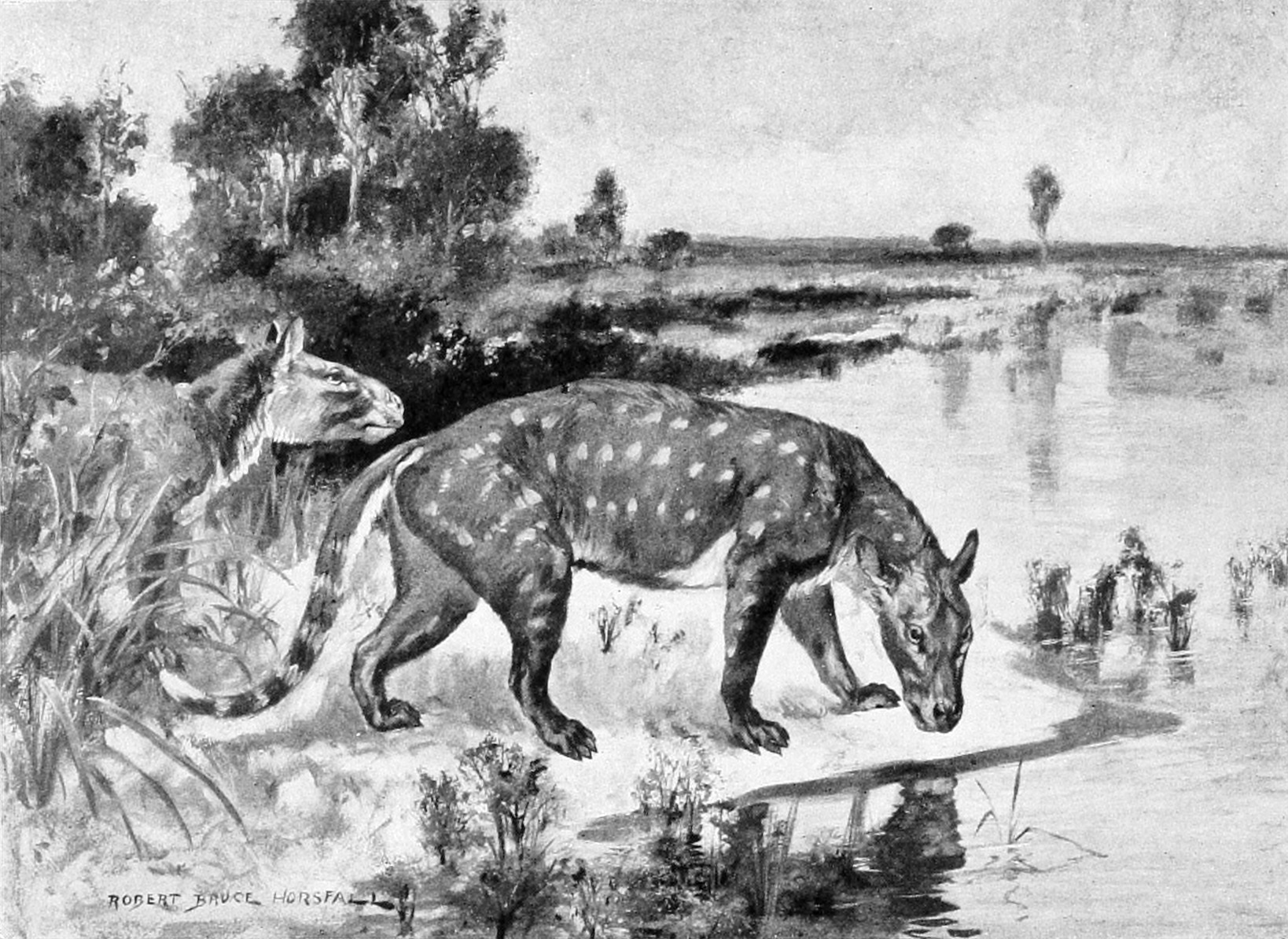
- Life restoration of the Eocene-Oligocene even-toed ungulate Agriochoerus
  †Agriochoerus
  - †Agriochoerus guyotianus
- Aix
  - †Aix sponsa
- Alangium
  - †Alangium eydei
  - †Alangium rotundicarpum
  - †Alangium thomae
- †Allocyon
  - †Allocyon loganensis
- †Allomys
  - †Allomys simplicidens
- †Alluvisorex
  - †Alluvisorex arcadentes
- Alnus
  - †Alnus carpinoides
  - †Alnus heterodonta
  - †Alnus newberryi
- †Alwoodia
  - †Alwoodia magna
- Amaea
  - †Amaea dickersoni – or unidentified related form
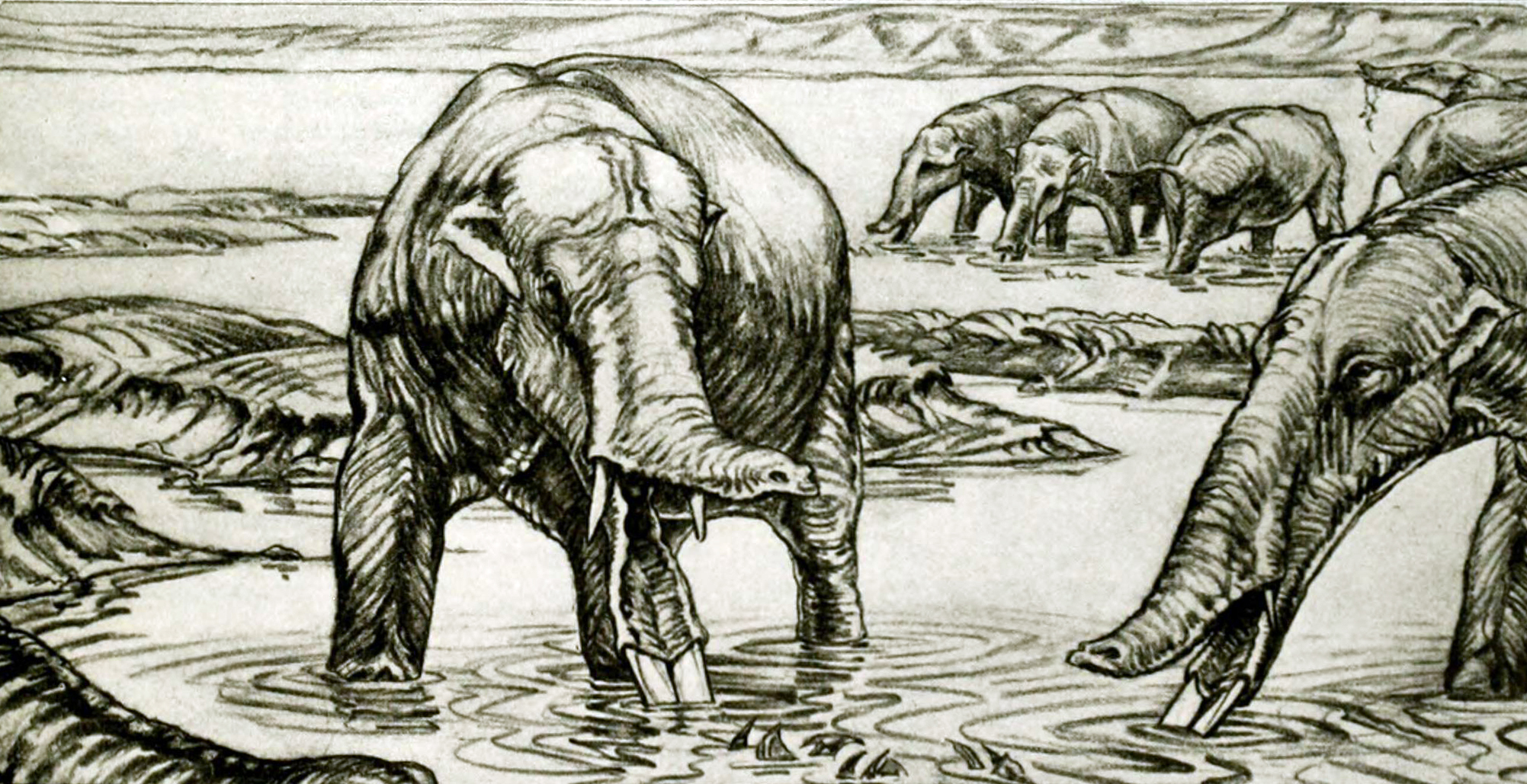
- Life restoration of the Miocene elephant relative Amebelodon. Margret Flinsch (1932).
  †Amebelodon
- Amelanchier
  - †Amelanchier covea
  - †Amelanchier grayi
- †Ameranella
  - †Ameranella terrysmithae – type locality for species
- Ammospermophilus
  - †Ammospermophilus junturensis
- Ampelocissus
  - †Ampelocissus auriforma
  - †Ampelocissus rooseae
  - †Ampelocissus scottii
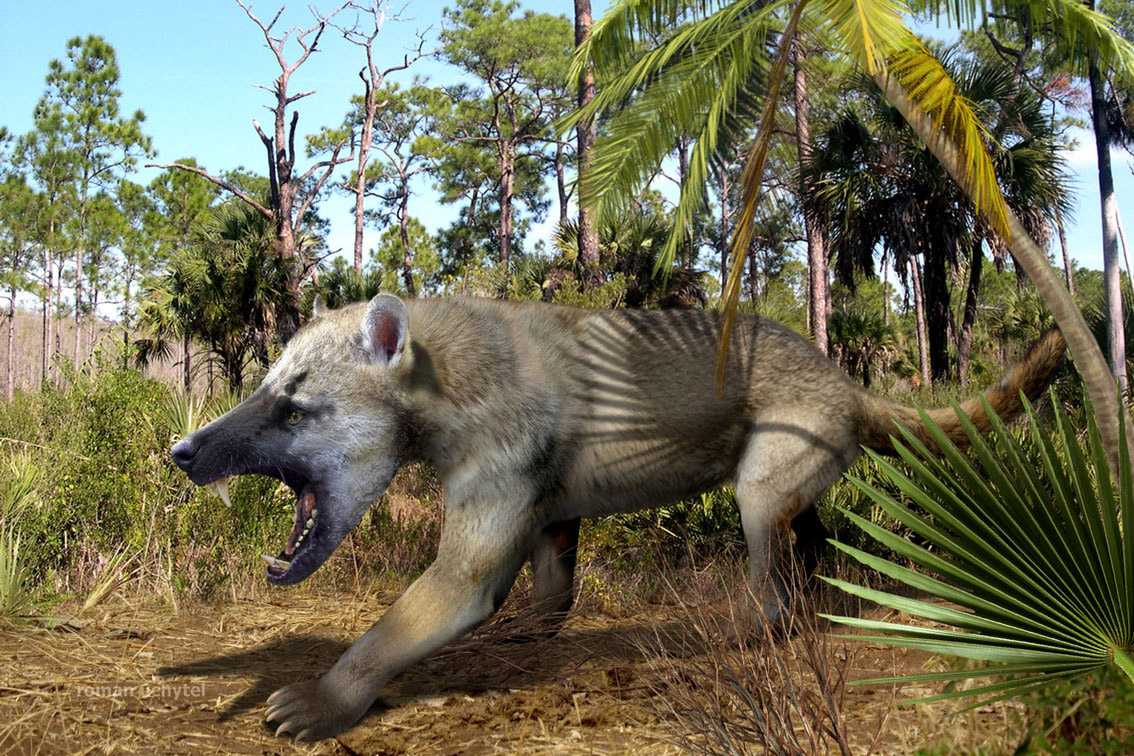
- Life restoration of the Miocene-Pliocene beardog Amphicyon
  †Amphicyon
  - †Amphicyon frendens
  - †Amphicyon galushai – or unidentified comparable form
- Amphissa
  - †Amphissa corrugata
- †Ampullina
  - †Ampullina oregonensis
- †Anabernicula
- Anadara
  - †Anadara devincta
- †Anamirta
  - †Anamirta leiocarpa
- Anas
  - †Anas acuta
  - †Anas americana
  - †Anas boschas
  - †Anas carolinensis
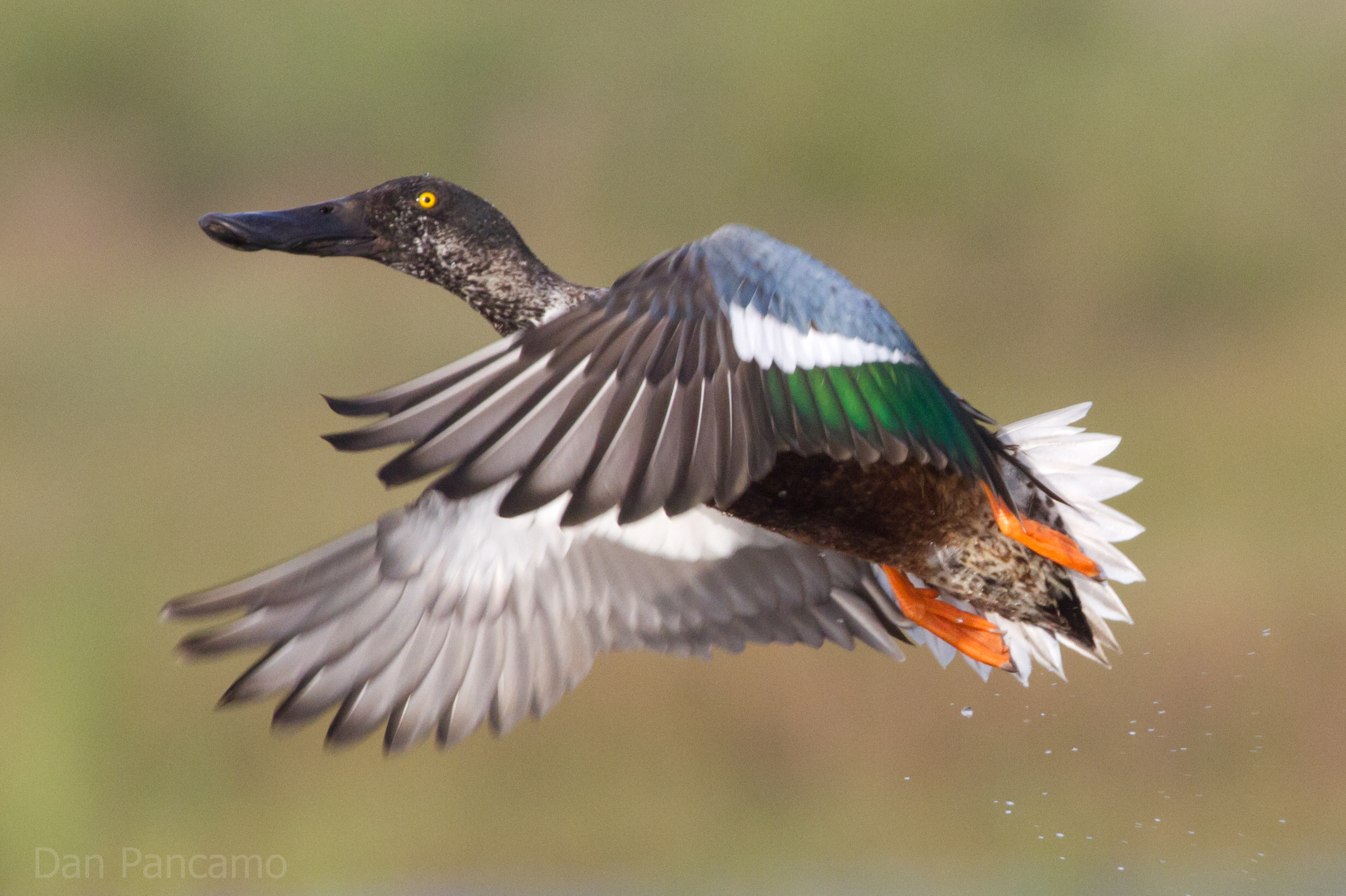
  - A living Spatula clypeata, or northern shoveler
    †Anas clypeata
  - †Anas cyanoptera
  - †Anas discors
  - †Anas platyrhynchos
- Ancilla
  - †Ancilla vernisa – type locality for species
- †Anechinocardium
  - †Anechinocardium lorenzanum
  - †Anechinocardium weaveri
- †Ankistrosperma
  - †Ankistrosperma spitzerae
- Anona
  - †Anona preretriculata
- †Anonaspermum
  - †Anonaspermum bonesii
  - †Anonaspermum pulchrum
  - †Anonaspermum rotundum
- †Anonymocarpa
  - †Anonymocarpa ovoidea
- †Anorthoscutum
  - †Anorthoscutum oregonensis
- Anser
  - †Anser albifrons
  - †Anser condoni – type locality for species
- †Antecalomys
  - †Antecalomys valensis
- Antillophos
  - †Antillophos dumbleana
- Antilocapra
  - †Antilocapra americana – or unidentified comparable form
- †Aperiploma
  - †Aperiploma bainbridgensis
- Aphananthe
  - †Aphananthe maii
- †Aphelops
  - †Aphelops megalodus
- Aquila
  - †Aquila chrysaetos
  - †Aquila pliogryps – type locality for species
  - †Aquila sodalis – type locality for species
- Arbacia
  - †Arbacia abiquaensis – type locality for species
- †Archaeocyon
  - †Archaeocyon pavidus
- †Archaeohippus
  - †Archaeohippus ultimus
- †Archaeolagus
  - †Archaeolagus macrocephalus – or unidentified comparable form
- †Archaeotherium
- Architectonica
  - †Architectonica blanda
- Archoplites
  - †Archoplites langrellorum – type locality for species
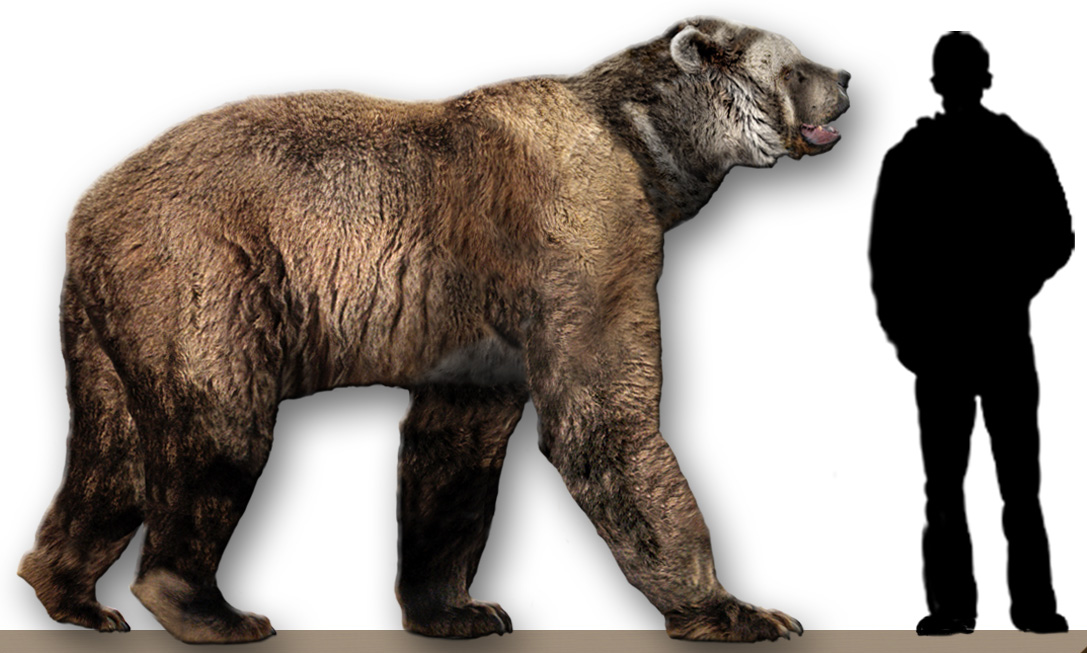
- Restoration of an Arctodus, or short-faced bear, with a human to scale
  †Arctodus
- †Arctomyoides
  - †Arctomyoides oregonensis
- Ardea
  - †Ardea herodias
  - †Ardea paloccidentalis – type locality for species
- Argobuccinum
  - †Argobuccinum cammani
  - †Argobuccinum coosense
  - †Argobuccinum jeffersonense
  - †Argobuccinum oregonense
- †Ascosphaera
  - †Ascosphaera eocenis
- †Asterocarpinus
  - †Asterocarpinus chaneyi
  - †Asterocarpinus perplexans
- Astraea
  - †Astraea inequalis
- Astreopora
  - †Astreopora occidentalis – type locality for species
- Astropecten
- †Atriaecarpum
  - †Atriaecarpum clarnense
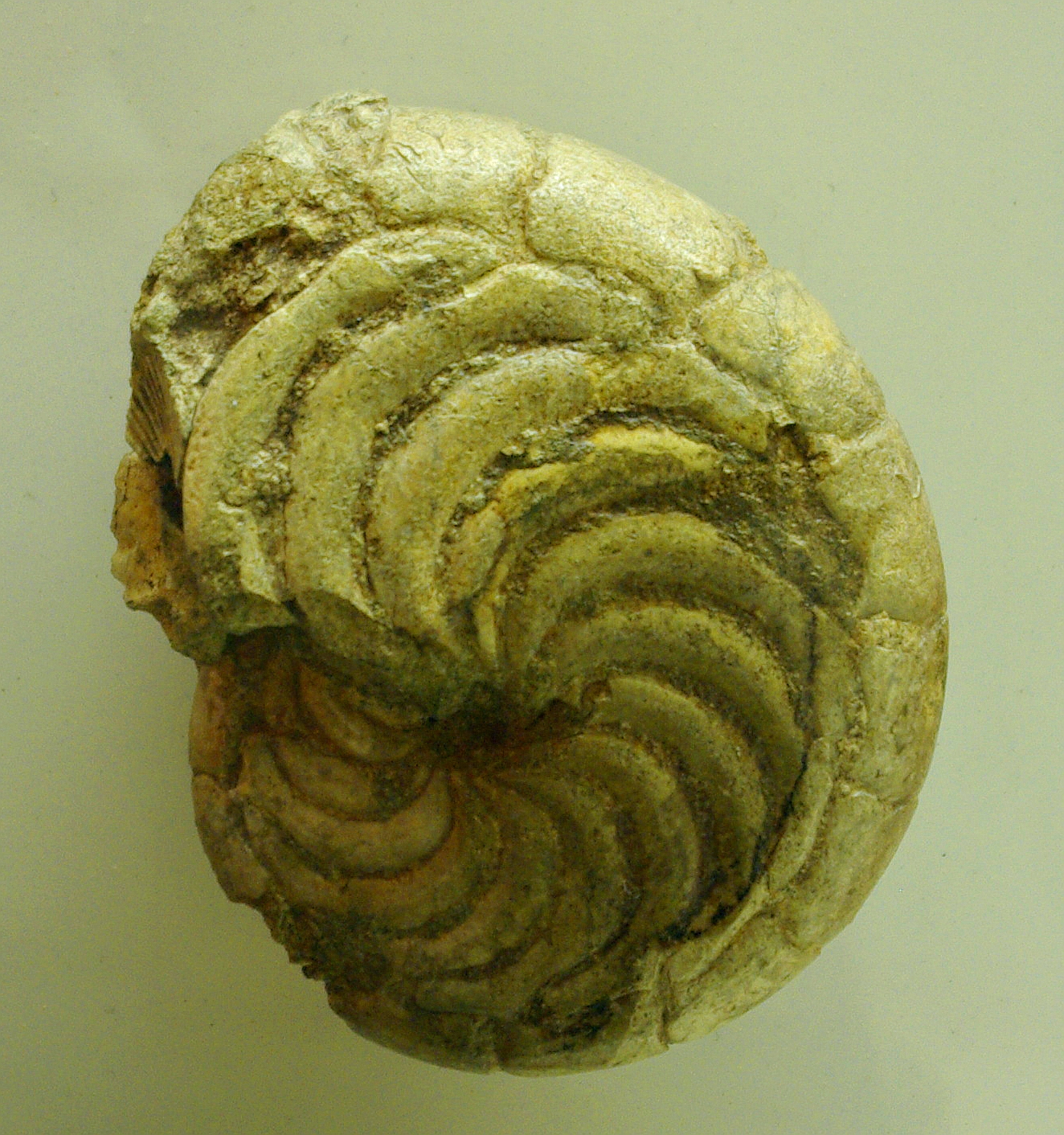
- Fossilized shell of the Paleocene-Miocene nautiloid cephalopod Aturia
  †Aturia
  - †Aturia angustata
  - †Aturia grandior – or unidentified comparable form
- †Aucuba
  - †Aucuba smileyi
- †Axinosperma
  - †Axinosperma agnostum
- Aythya
  - †Aythya marila

== B ==
- Balaena
- Balaenoptera
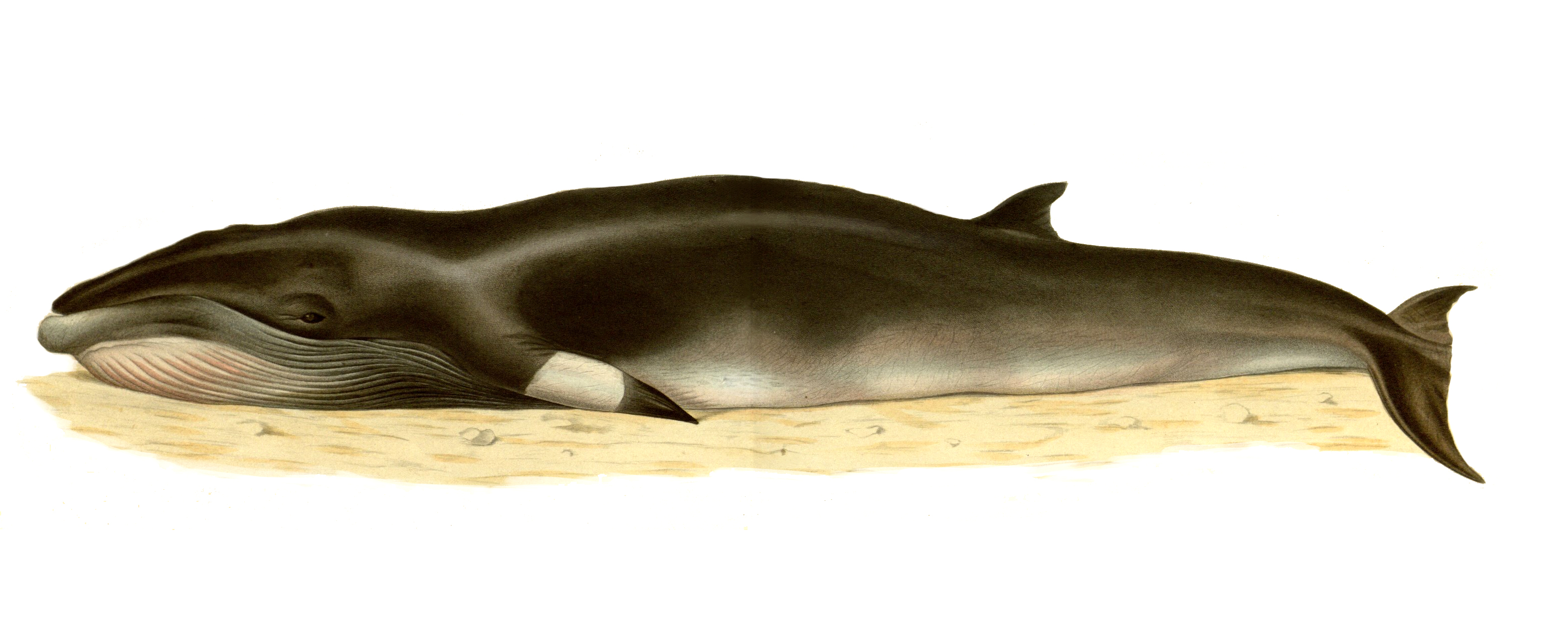
  - Illustration of a living Balaenoptera acutorostrata, or common minke whale
    †Balaenoptera acutorostrata – or unidentified comparable form
- Balanophyllia
  - †Balanophyllia elegans
- Balanus
- Balcis
- †Barbouromeryx
- Bartramia
  - †Bartramia umatilla – type locality for species
- †Basirepomys
  - †Basirepomys pliocenicus – or unidentified comparable form
  - †Basirepomys romensis – type locality for species
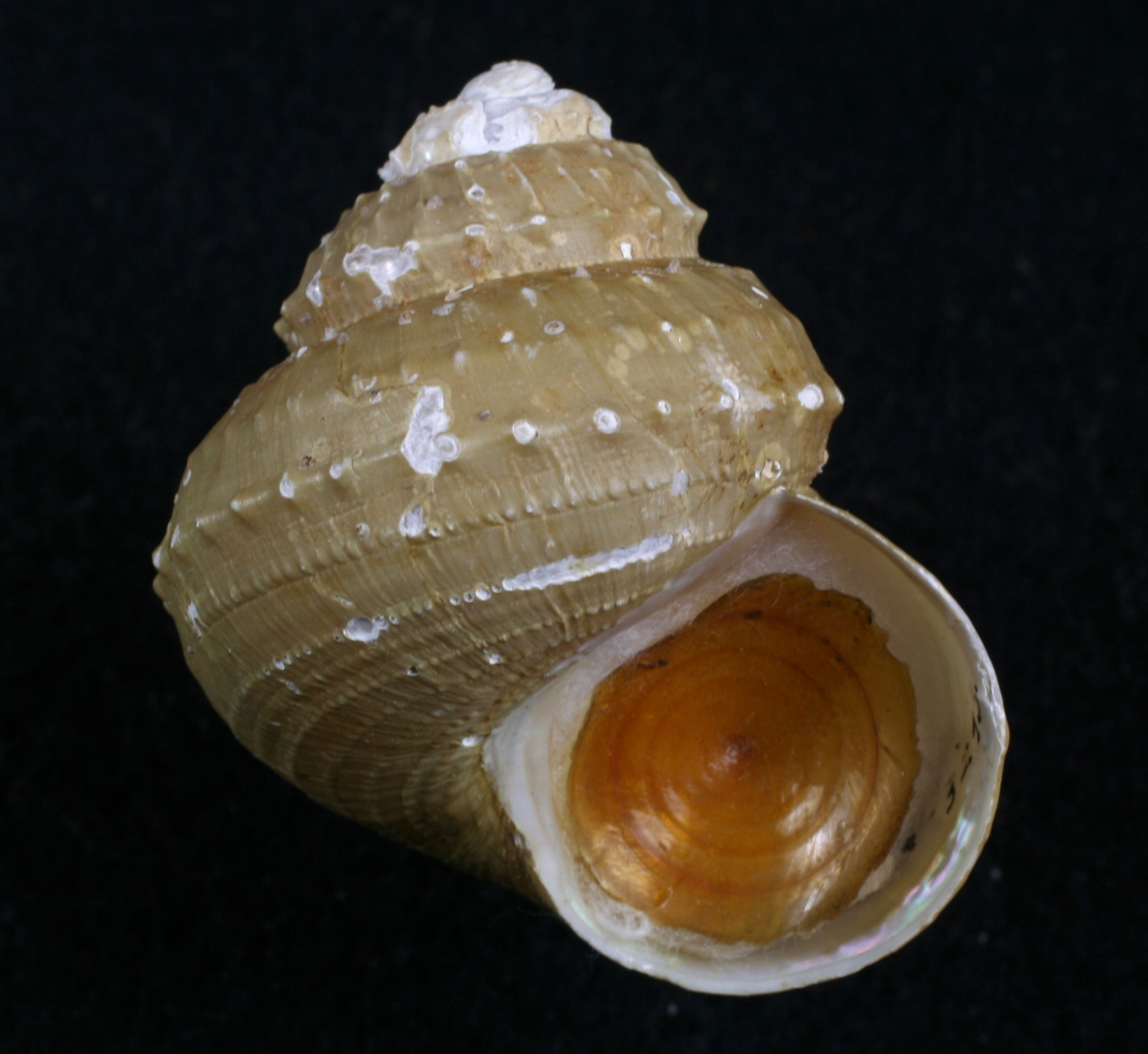
- Shell of a Bathybembix sea snail
  Bathybembix
  - †Bathybembix columbiana
  - †Bathybembix nitor – type locality for species
- Bathytoma
  - †Bathytoma gabbiana
- †Beckerosperma
  - †Beckerosperma ovalicarpa
- Bela
  - †Bela tabulata
- Betula
  - †Betula angustifolia
- Bittium
  - †Bittium eschrichti
- †Bonellitia
  - †Bonellitia paucivaricata
  - †Bonellitia smithwickensis – type locality for species
  - †Bonellitia tumida – type locality for species
- †Bonesia
  - †Bonesia spatulata
- Boreotrophon
  - †Boreotrophon gracilis
  - †Boreotrophon stuarti
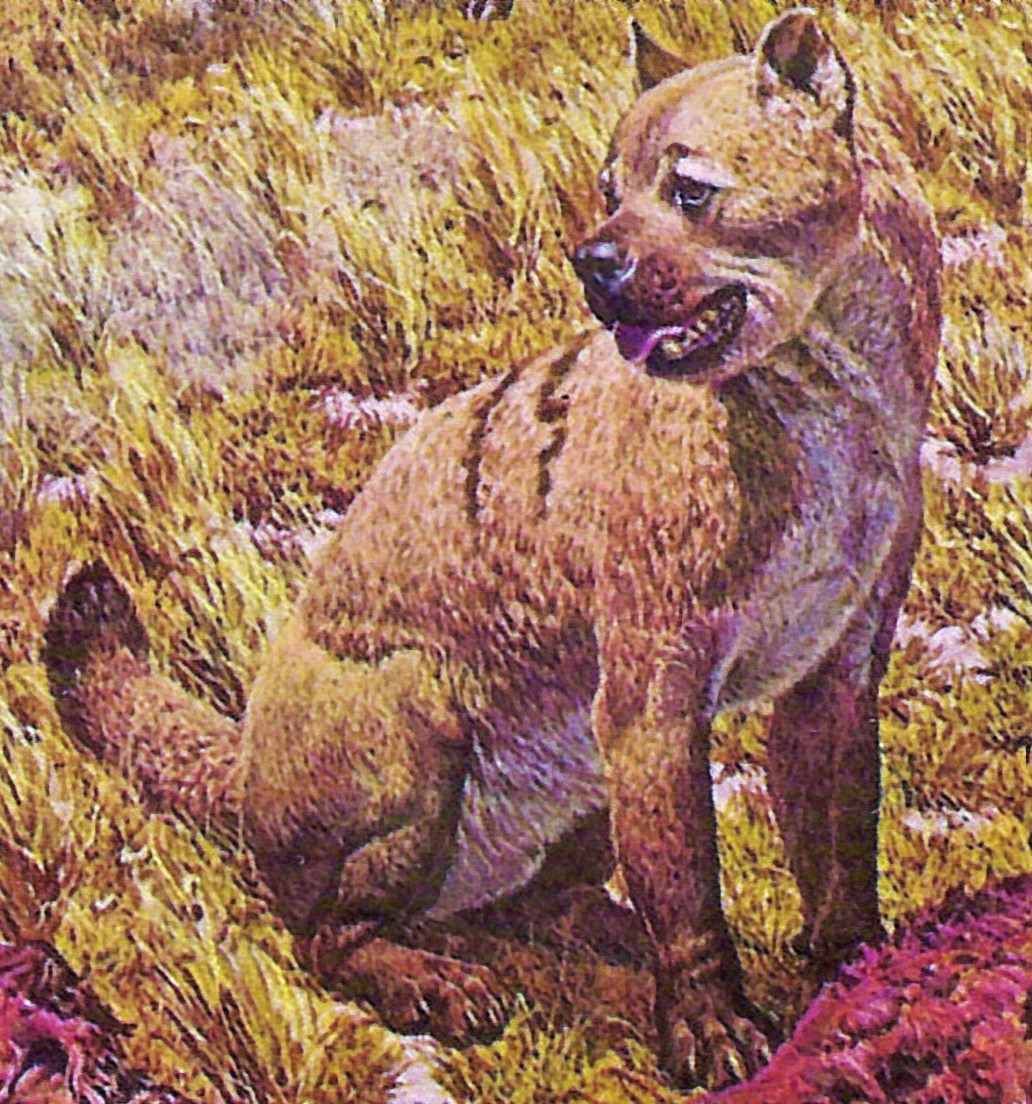
- Restoration of two of the Miocene-Pliocene bone-crushing dog genus Borophagus preying on a camel. Jay Matternes (1964).
  †Borophagus
  - †Borophagus pugnator
  - †Borophagus secundus – or unidentified comparable form
- Botaurus
  - †Botaurus lentiginosus
- †Bouromeryx
  - †Bouromeryx americanus – or unidentified comparable form
  - †Bouromeryx submilleri
- Brachidontes
  - †Brachidontes cowlitzensis
- Branta
  - †Branta bernicla
  - †Branta canadensis
  - †Branta hypsibata – tentative report
  - †Branta hypsibatus
  - †Branta propinqua – type locality for species
- †Bruclarkia
  - †Bruclarkia columbiana
  - †Bruclarkia columbianum
  - †Bruclarkia oregonensis
  - †Bruclarkia vokesi
- Bubo
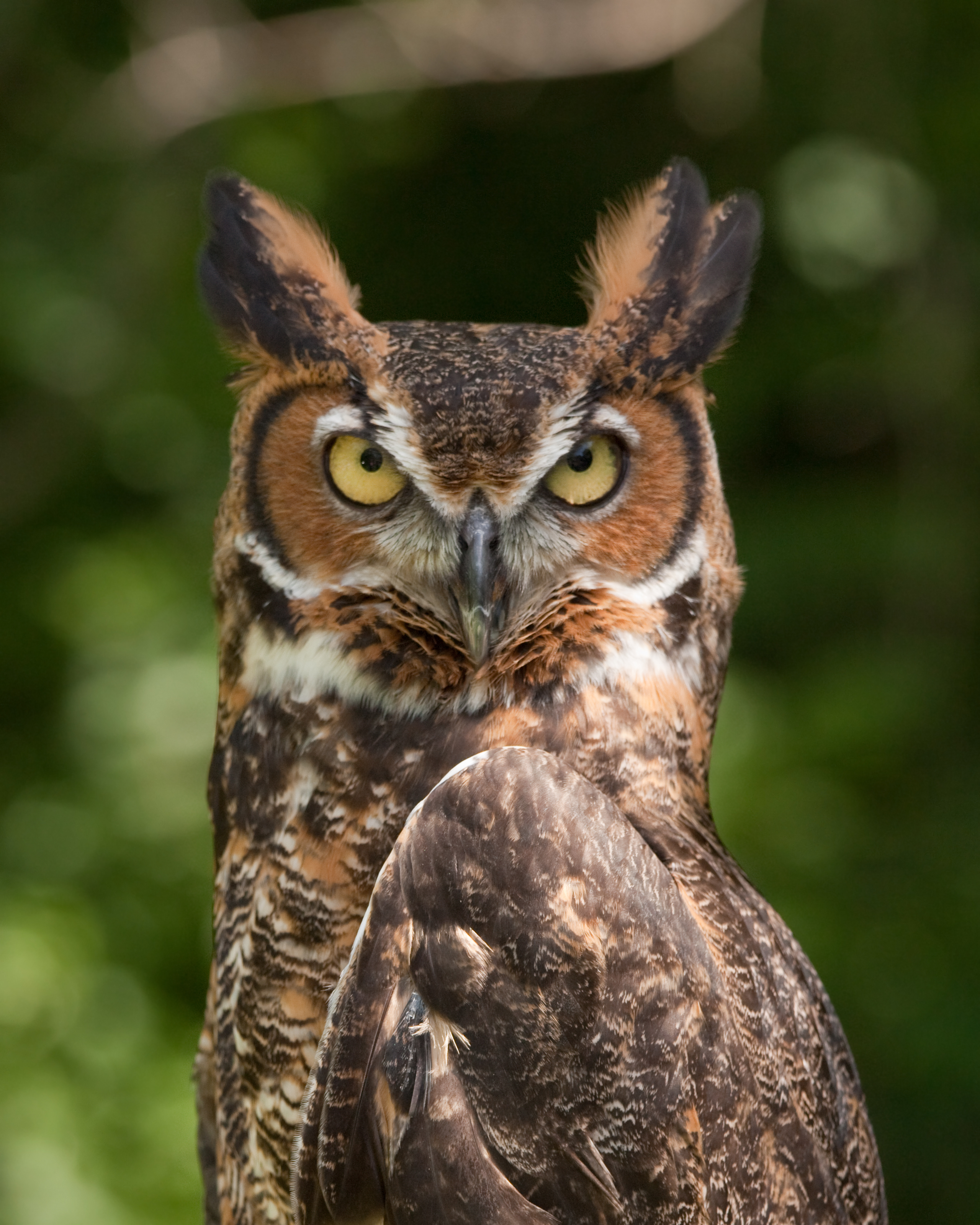
  - A living Bubo virginianus, or great horned owl
    †Bubo virginianus
- Buccinum
  - †Buccinum strigillatum
- Bullia
  - †Bullia bogachielia
- †Bumelia – tentative report
  - †Bumelia? subangularis
- †Bursericarpum
  - †Bursericarpum oregonense

== C ==
- Cadulus
- Calliostoma
  - †Calliostoma cammani
  - †Calliostoma costatum
- Callista
  - †Callista conradiana
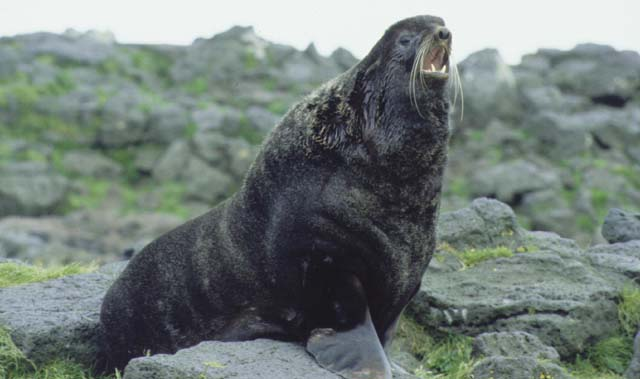
- A living Callorhinus ursinus, or northern fur seal
  Callorhinus – tentative report
- ] †Calocedrus
  - †Calocedrus schornii
- †Calycocarpum
  - †Calycocarpum crassicrustae
- Calyptraea
  - †Calyptraea diegoana
  - †Calyptraea fastigiata
  - †Calyptraea inornata
  - †Calyptraea sookensis
- †Camelops
  - †Camelops hesternus
- Cancellaria
  - †Cancellaria oregonensis
  - †Cancellaria siletzensis
- Canis
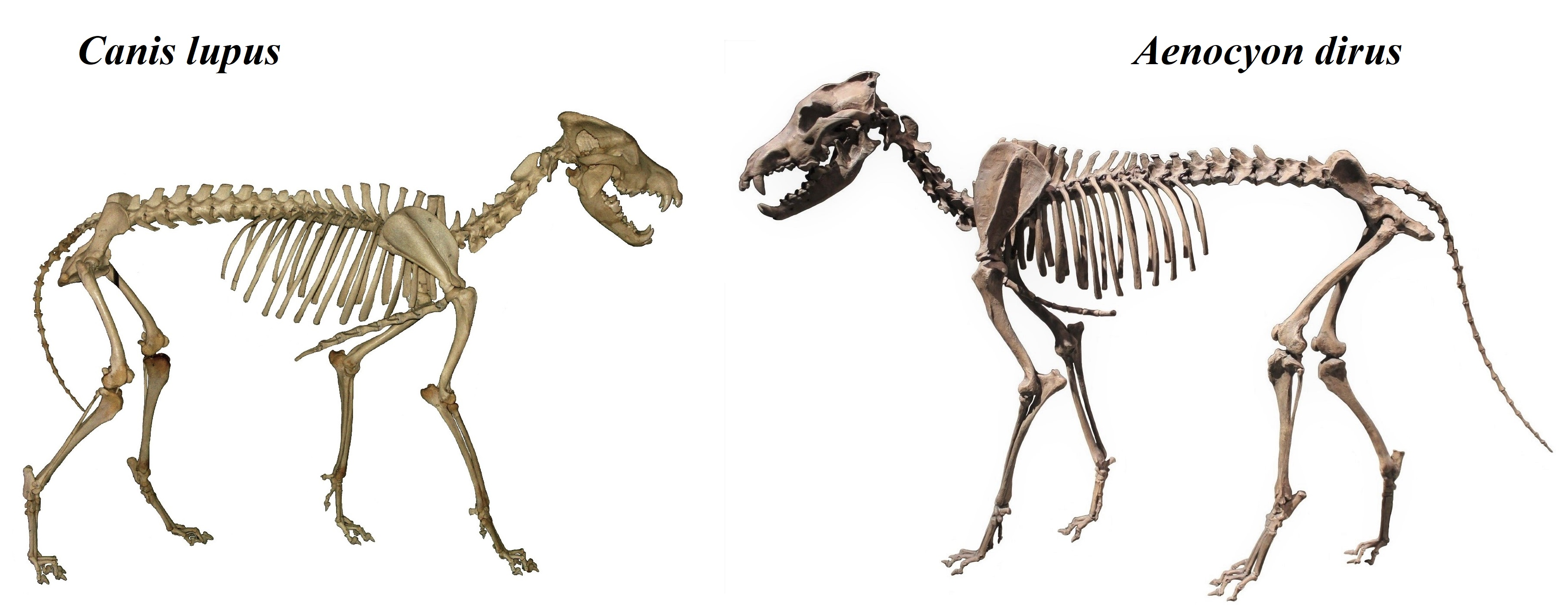
  - Modern mounted skeleton of Canis lupus, the grey wolf, to scale with a fossilized skeleton of the Pleistocene wolf Canis dirus, or dire wolf
    †Canis dirus – or unidentified comparable form
  - †Canis edwardii
  - †Canis latrans
  - †Canis lupus – or unidentified comparable form
- Cardiomya
  - †Cardiomya anaticepsella – type locality for species
  - †Cardiomya pavascotti
- †Carpocyon
- †Carpolithus
  - †Carpolithus bellisperma
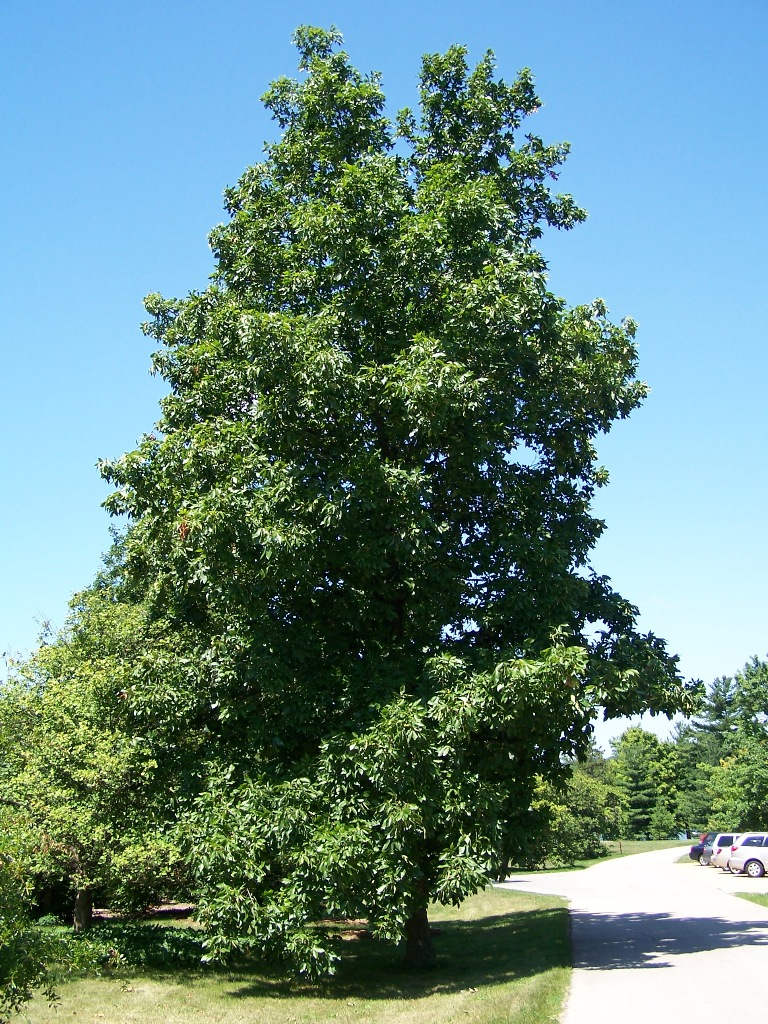
- A living Carya, or hickory tree
  Carya
- Caryophyllia
  - †Caryophyllia oregonensis – type locality for species
- Castanea
  - †Castanea basidentata
- Castanopsis
  - †Castanopsis crepetii
  - †Castanopsis longifolius
- Castor
- †Catalpa
- Cedrela
  - †Cedrela merrillii
- †Cedrelospermum
  - †Cedrelospermum lineatum
- Celleporina
- Celtis
  - †Celtis burnhamae
- †Centrocercus
  - †Centrocercus urophasianus
- Cercidiphyllum
  - †Cercidiphyllum crenatum
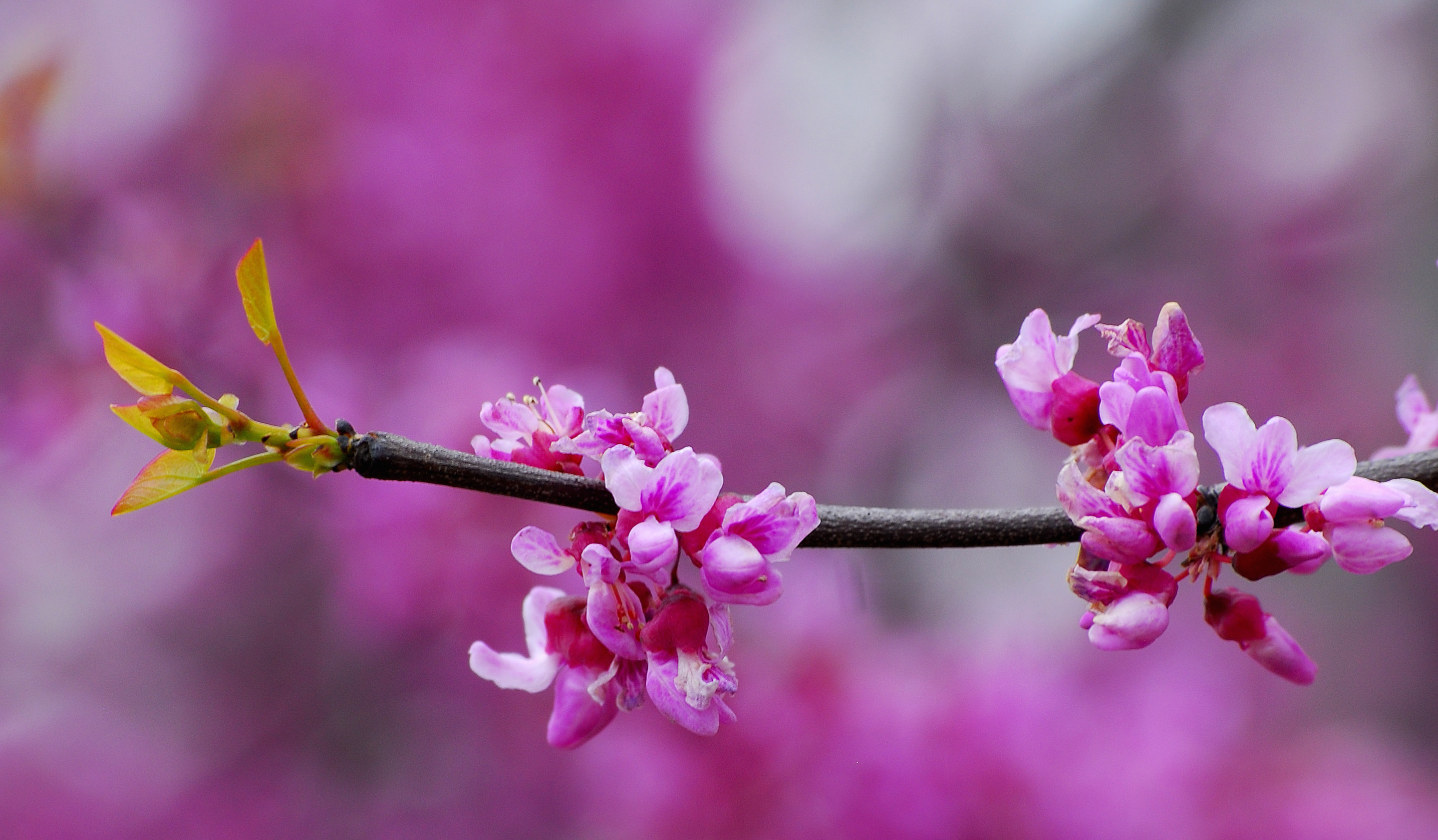
- Flowers of a living Cercis or redbud tree
  Cercis
  - †Cercis maurerae
- Cerithiopsis
  - †Cerithiopsis preussi – or unidentified comparable form
- †Chandlera
  - †Chandlera lacunosa
- †Charitonetta
  - †Charitonetta albeola
- Chen
  - †Chen hyperborea
  - †Chen rossii
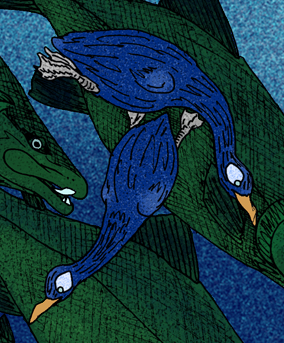
- Life restoration of the Pleistocene-Holocene Chendytes, or Law's diving-goose
  †Chendytes
- Chione
  - †Chione ensifera
  - †Chione securis
- Chlidonias
  - †Chlidonias nigra
- Chlorostoma
  - †Chlorostoma pacificum
- †Choerodon
  - †Choerodon caninus
- †Chrysodomus
  - †Chrysodomus bairdi
  - †Chrysodomus imperialis
  - †Chrysodomus nodiferus
  - †Chrysodomus phoenicus
  - †Chrysodomus tabulatus
- Ciliatocardium
  - †Ciliatocardium coosense
- †Cinnamomophyllum
  - †Cinnamomophyllum bendirei
- Circus
  - †Circus eyaneus
- Cladrastis
  - †Cladrastis oregonensis
- Clangula
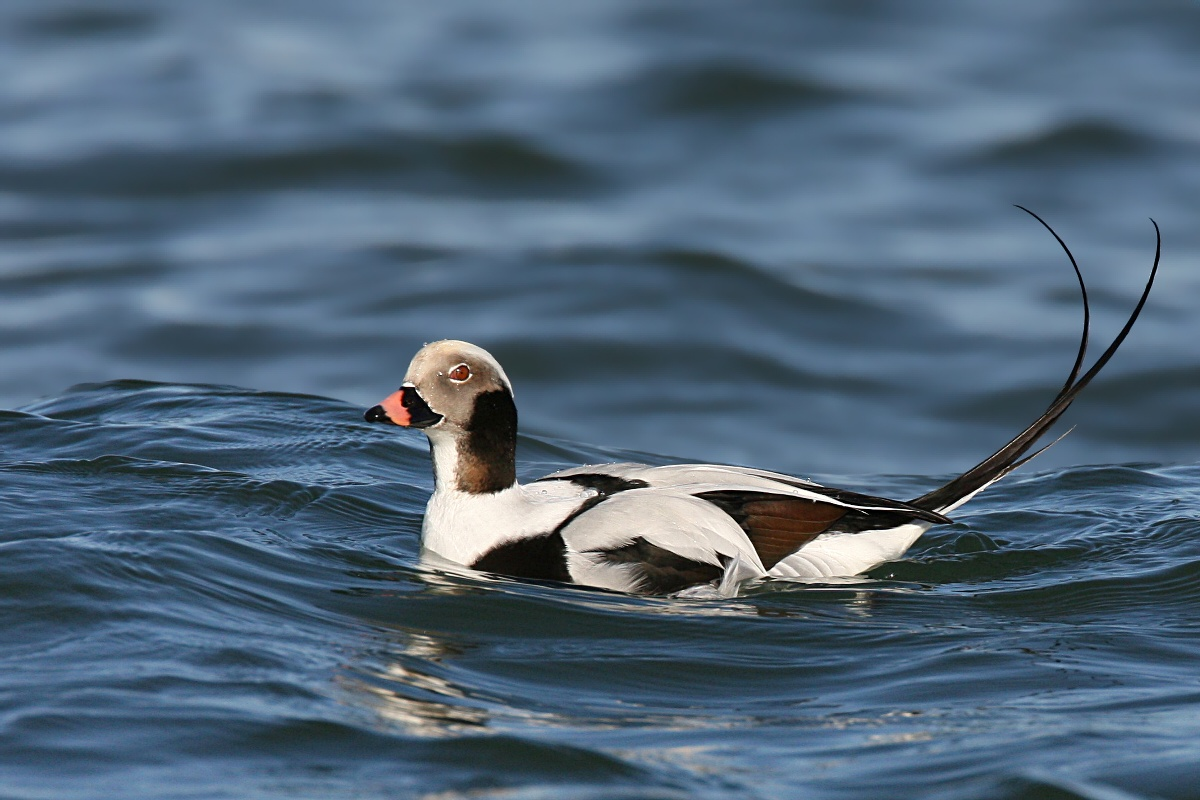
  - A living Clangula hyemalis, or long-tailed duck
    †Clangula hyemalis
- Cleyera
  - †Cleyera grotei
- Clinocardium
  - †Clinocardium meekianum
  - †Clinocardium nuttallii
- †Clivuloturris
  - †Clivuloturris levis – or unidentified comparable form
- Cochliolepis – tentative report
  - †Cochliolepis schoonerensis
- Colaptes
  - †Colaptes cafer
- †Colodon
- Columbella
  - †Columbella gausapata
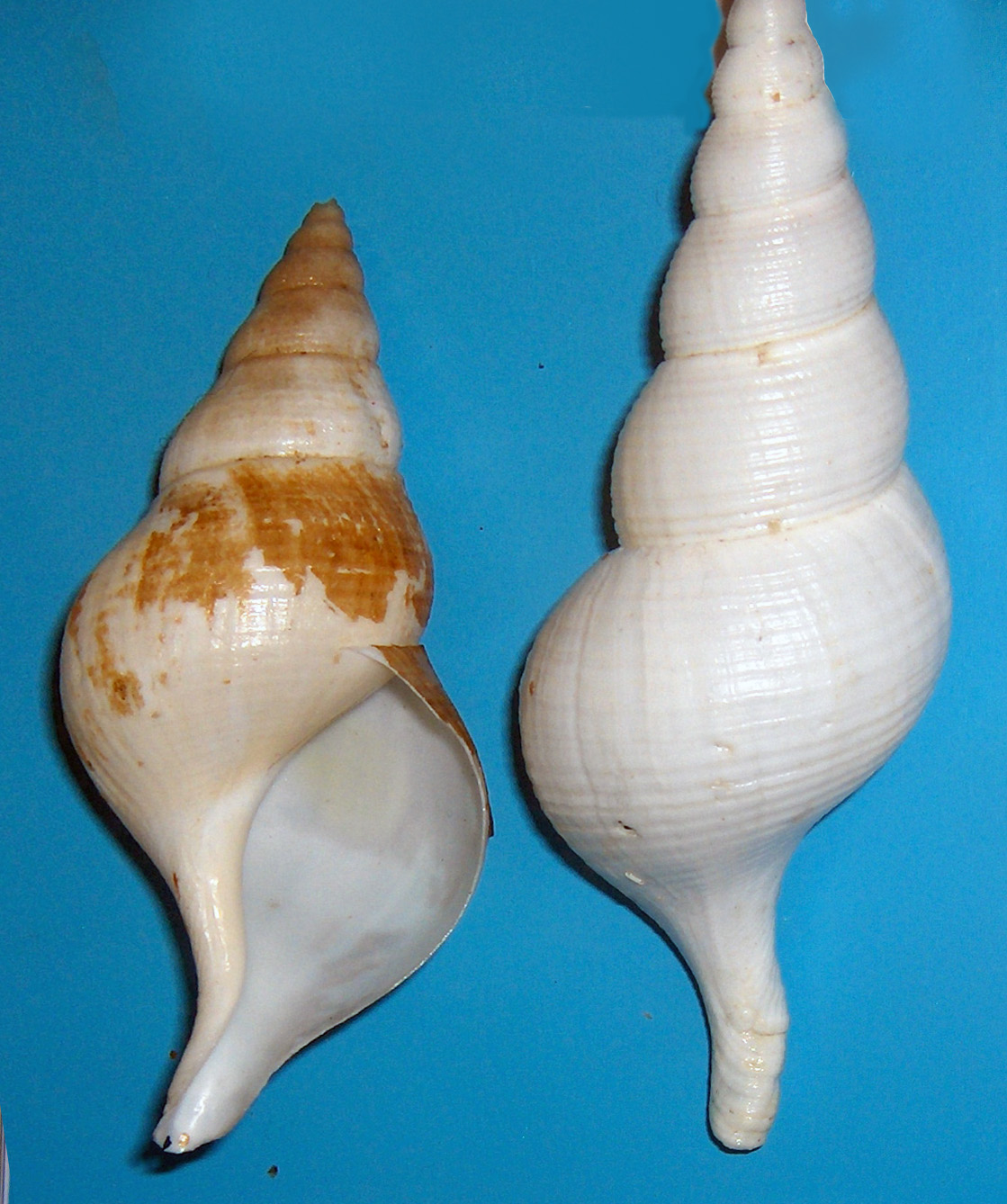
- Shells in differing orientations of Colus whelk sea snails
  Colus – tentative report
  - †Colus precursor
- Colymbus
  - †Colymbus holbellii
  - †Colymbus nigricollis
  - †Colymbus oligocaenus – type locality for species
  - †Colymbus parvus
- †Comicilabium
  - †Comicilabium atkinsii
- Comitas
  - †Comitas monile
  - †Comitas oregonensis
  - †Comitas spencerensis
- †Comminicarpa
  - †Comminicarpa friisae
- Comptonia
  - †Comptonia columbiana
- †Conchocele
  - †Conchocele bathyaulax
  - †Conchocele bisecta
  - †Conchocele taylori
- Conomitra
  - †Conomitra vernoniana – type locality for species
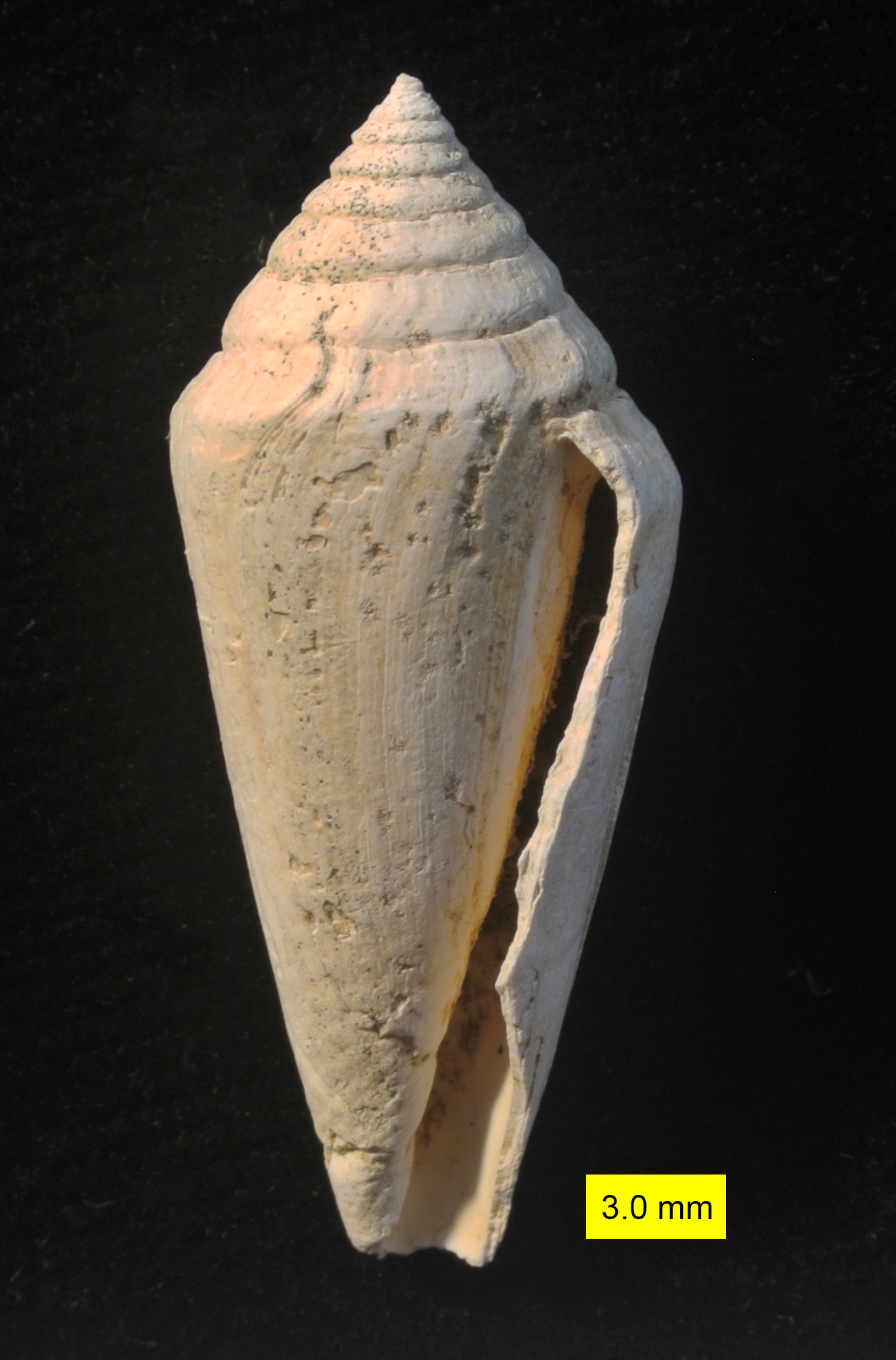
- Fossilized shell of a Conus cone snail
  Conus
  - †Conus armentrouti – type locality for species
  - †Conus weltoni – type locality for species
- †Copemys
  - †Copemys barstowensis
  - †Copemys esmeraldensis
  - †Copemys pagei
- †Cophocetus – type locality for genus
  - †Cophocetus oregonensis – type locality for species
- Corbula
  - †Corbula dickersoni
- †Cormocyon
  - †Cormocyon copei
- Cornus
  - †Cornus clarnensis
- †Cornwallius
  - †Cornwallius sookensis
- Corvus
  - †Corvus annectens – type locality for species
  - †Corvus corax
- †Coryloides
  - †Coryloides hancockii
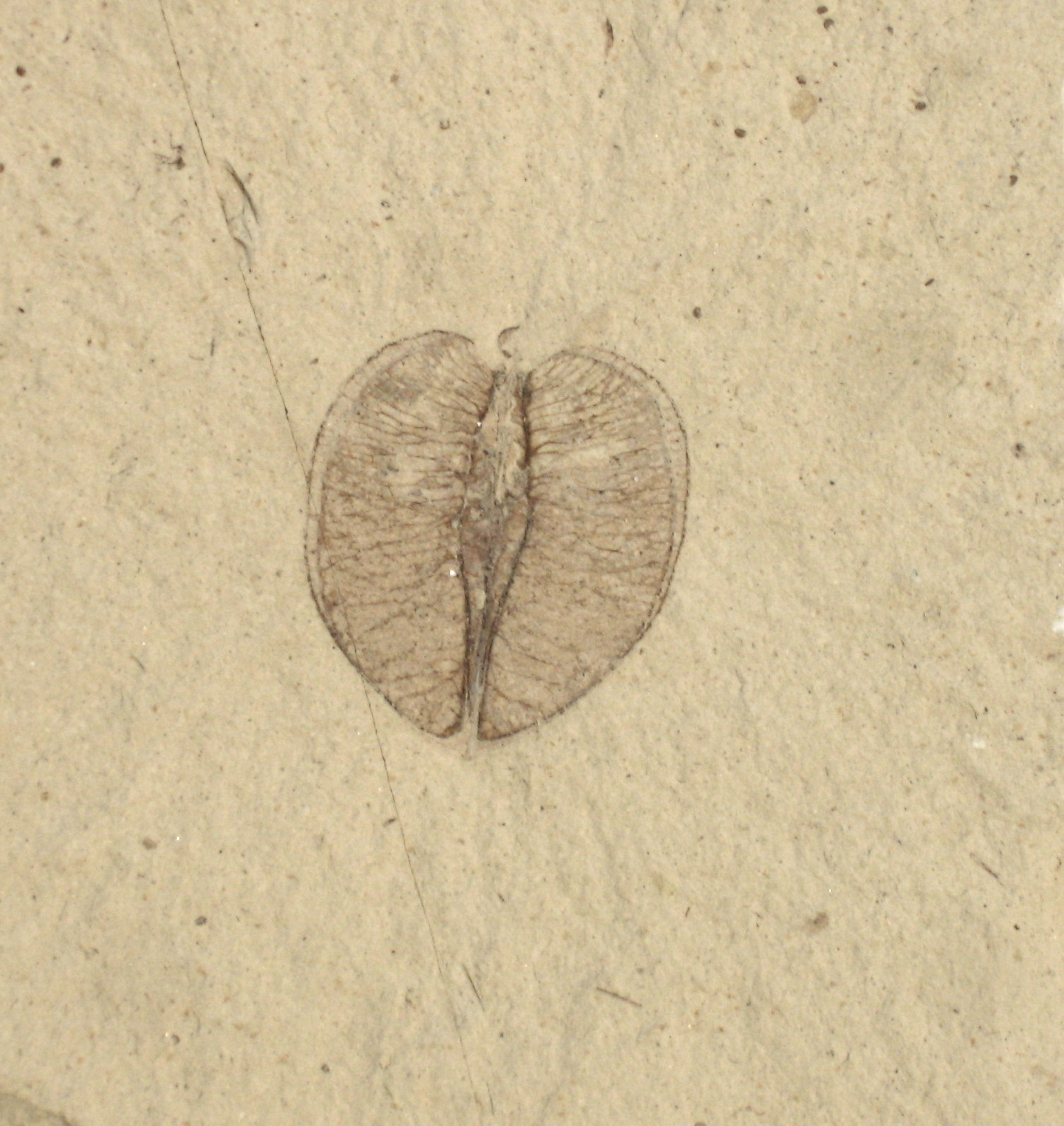
- Fossilized fruit of a Craigia plant
  Craigia
  - †Craigia oregonensis
- Crataegus
  - †Crataegus merriamii
  - †Crataegus newberryi
- Crenella
  - †Crenella porterensis – or unidentified comparable form
- Crepidula
  - †Crepidula adunca
  - †Crepidula grandis – or unidentified comparable form
  - †Crepidula praerupta
  - †Crepidula princeps
  - †Crepidula ungana
- †Cruciptera
  - †Cruciptera simsonii
- †Crusafontina
  - †Crusafontina minima
- Cryptomya
  - †Cryptomya californica
- Cryptonatica
  - †Cryptonatica affinis
  - †Cryptonatica oregonensis
  - †Cryptonatica pittsburgensis
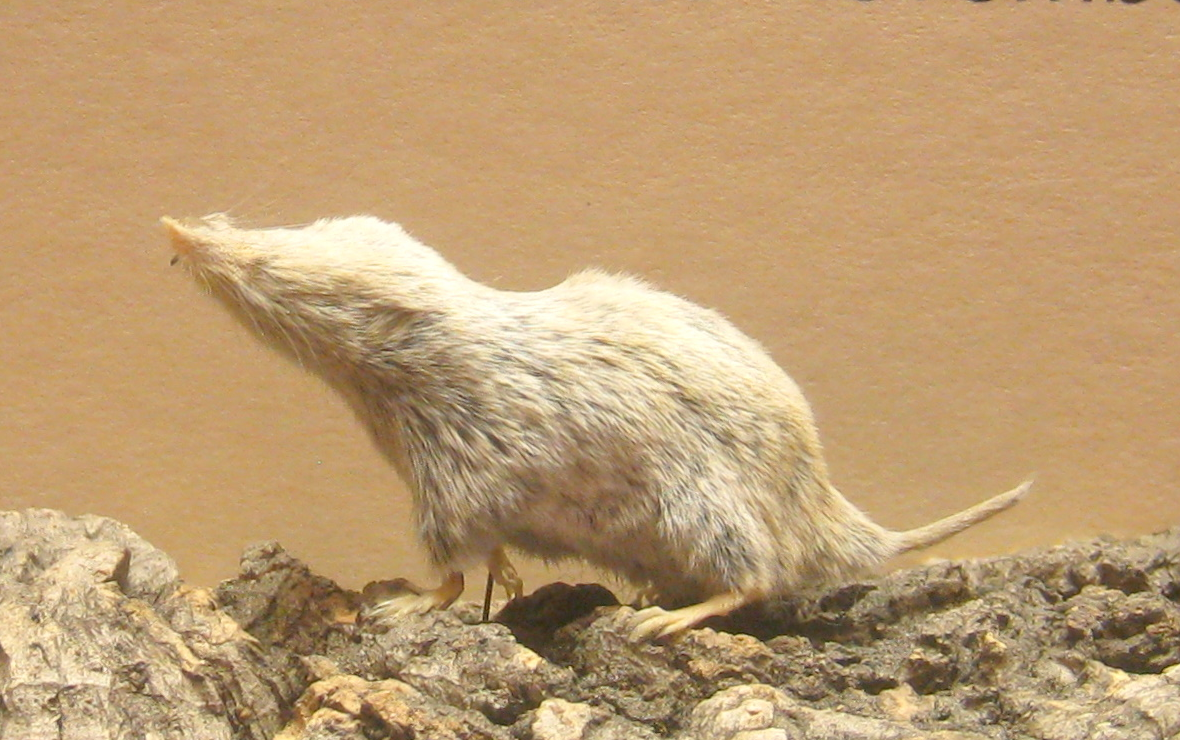
- A taxidermied Cryptotis , or small-eared shrew
  Cryptotis
  - †Cryptotis adamsi
- †Cuneisemen
  - †Cuneisemen truncatum
- †Cunninghamia
  - †Cunninghamia chaneyi
- †Cupidinimus
  - †Cupidinimus magnus
- †Curvitinospora
  - †Curvitinospora formanii
- Cyclocardia
  - †Cyclocardia hannibali – or unidentified comparable form
  - †Cyclocardia moniligena
  - †Cyclocardia subtenta
  - †Cyclocardia ventricosa
- †Cyclotella
  - †Cyclotella jonesii – type locality for species
- Cygnus
  - †Cygnus paloregonus
- Cymatium
  - †Cymatium pacificum
- †Cynarctoides
  - †Cynarctoides lemur
  - †Cynarctoides luskensis – or unidentified comparable form
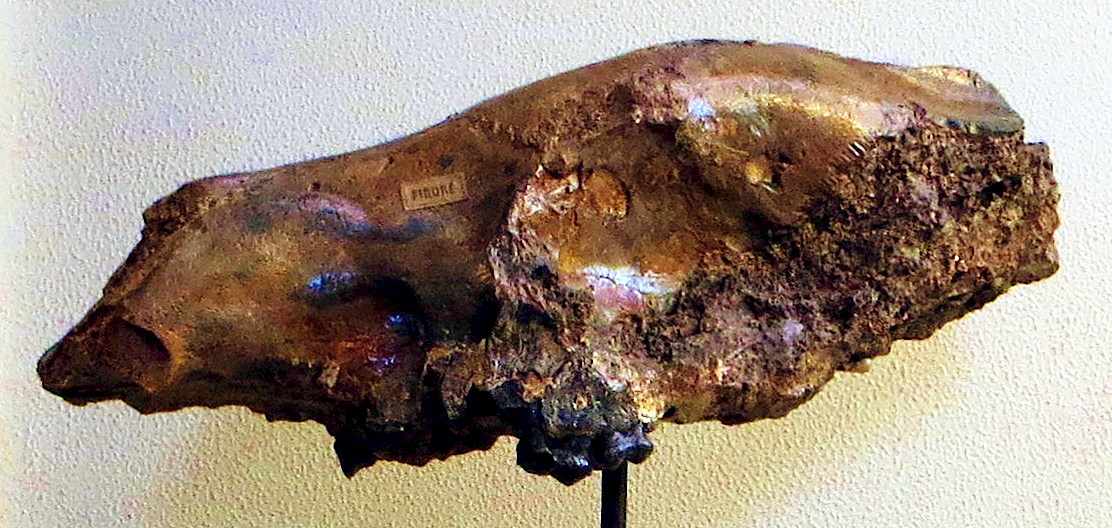
- Fossilized cranium of the Miocene bear-dog Cynelos
  †Cynelos
  - †Cynelos sinapius
- †Cynorca
- †Cyperacites

== D ==
- †Daeodon
- Dafila
  - †Dafila acuta
- †Daphoenodon
  - †Daphoenodon robustum
- †Daphoenus
  - †Daphoenus socialis
- †Dasmia
  - †Dasmia americana – type locality for species
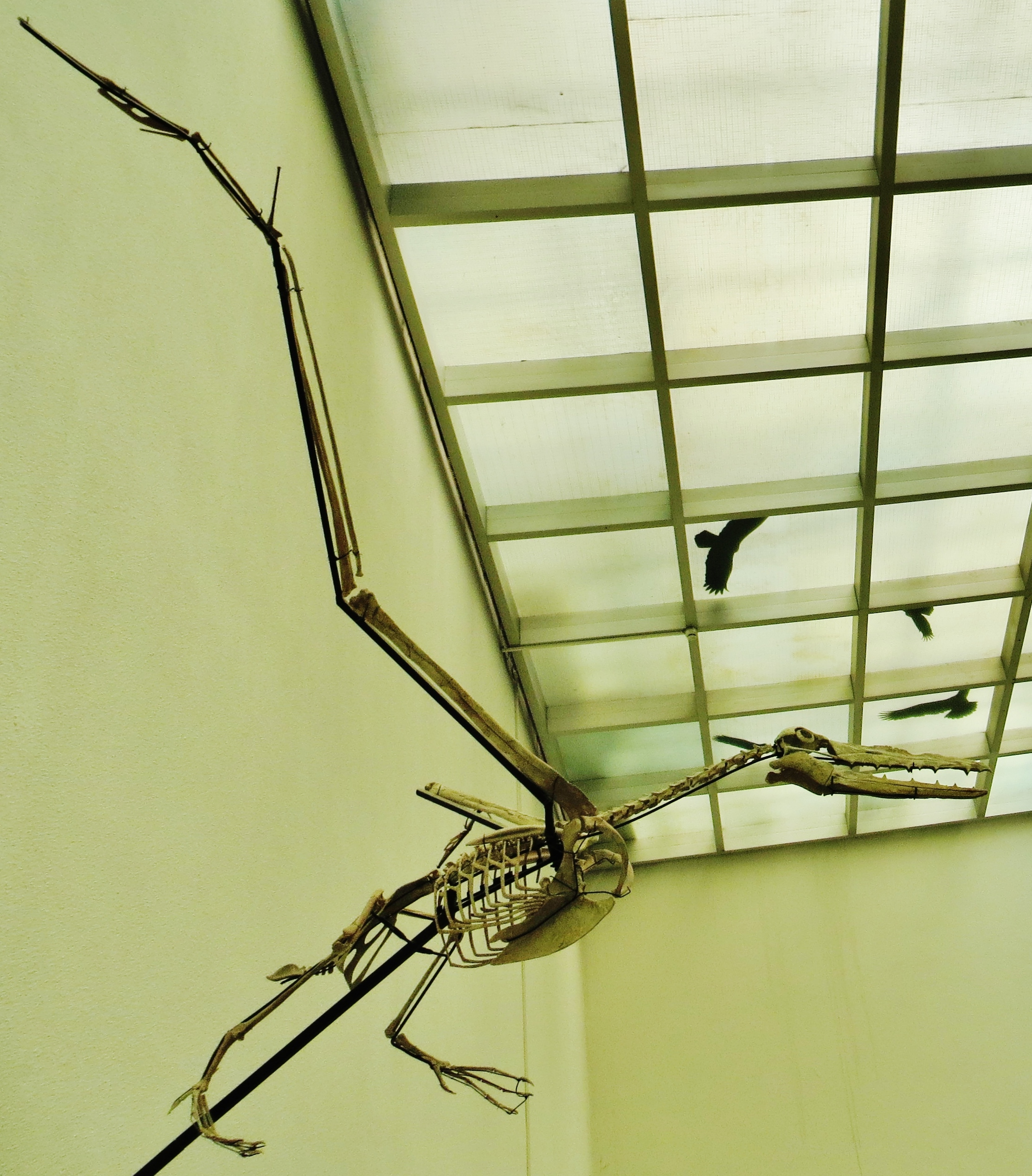
- Mounted fossilized skeleton of the Eocene pseudo-toothed bird Dasornis
  †Dasornis – or unidentified related form
- †Davisicarpum
  - †Davisicarpum limacioides
- Decodon
  - †Decodon brownii
- Delectopecten
  - †Delectopecten peckhami
- Dendragapus – type locality for genus
  - †Dendragapus gillii – type locality for species
- †Dendrogapus
  - †Dendrogapus lucasi
  - †Dendrogapus nanus
- Dentalium
  - †Dentalium laneensis
  - †Dentalium pseudonyma
  - †Dentalium rectius
  - †Dentalium stentor
- †Dentisemen
  - †Dentisemen parvum
- †Desmatippus
  - †Desmatippus avus
- †Desmatochoerus
  - †Desmatochoerus leidyi
- †Desmatolagus
- †Desmatophoca
  - †Desmatophoca oregonensis
- †Desmocyon
  - †Desmocyon thomsoni
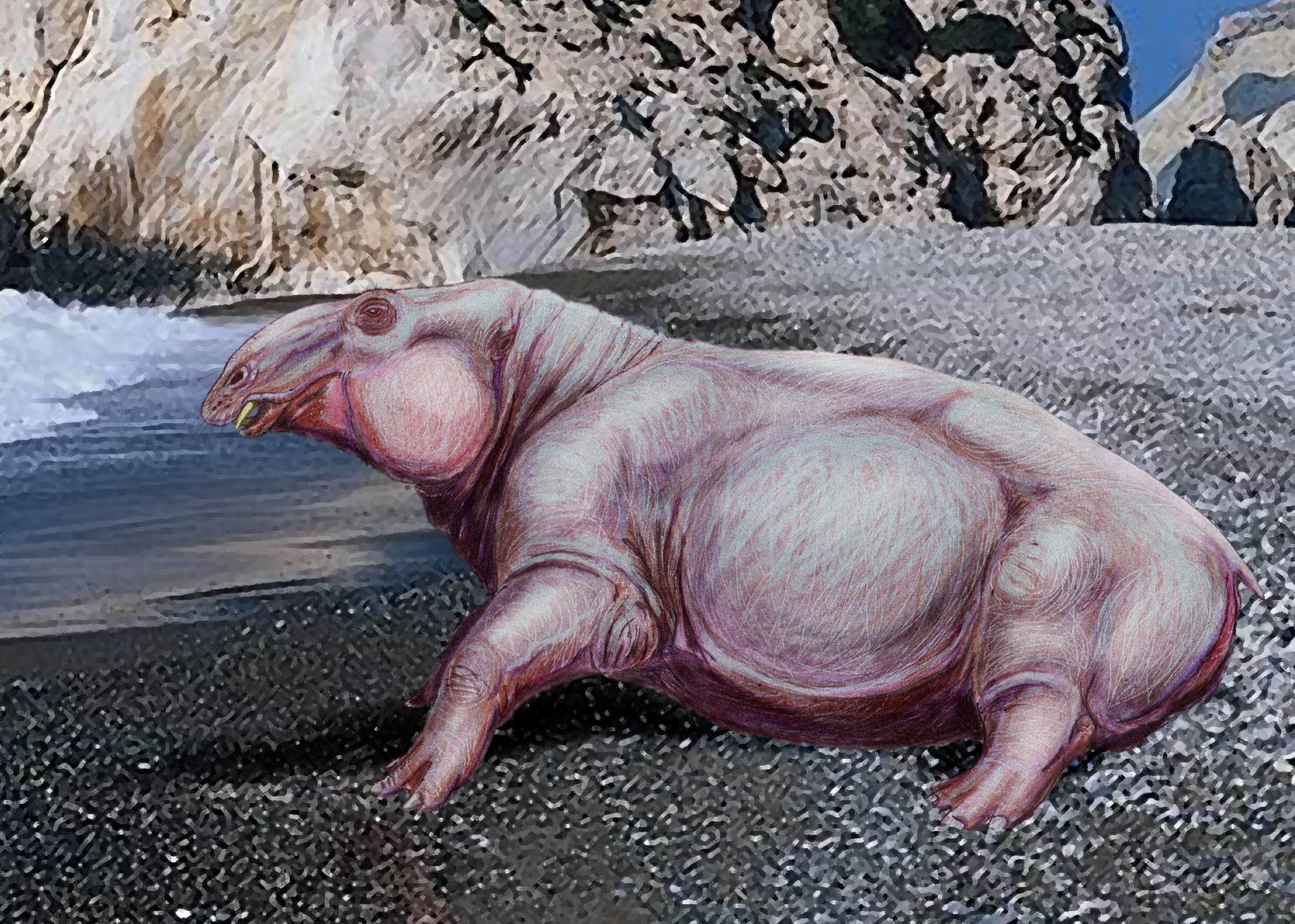
- Life restoration of the Oligocene-Miocene herbivorous marine mammal Desmostylus
  †Desmostylus
  - †Desmostylus hesperus – type locality for species
- †Deviacer
  - †Deviacer wolfei
- †Diceratherium
  - †Diceratherium annectens
  - †Diceratherium armatum
- †Dilophodelphis – type locality for genus
  - †Dilophodelphis fordycei – type locality for species
- †Dinaelurus
  - †Dinaelurus crassus
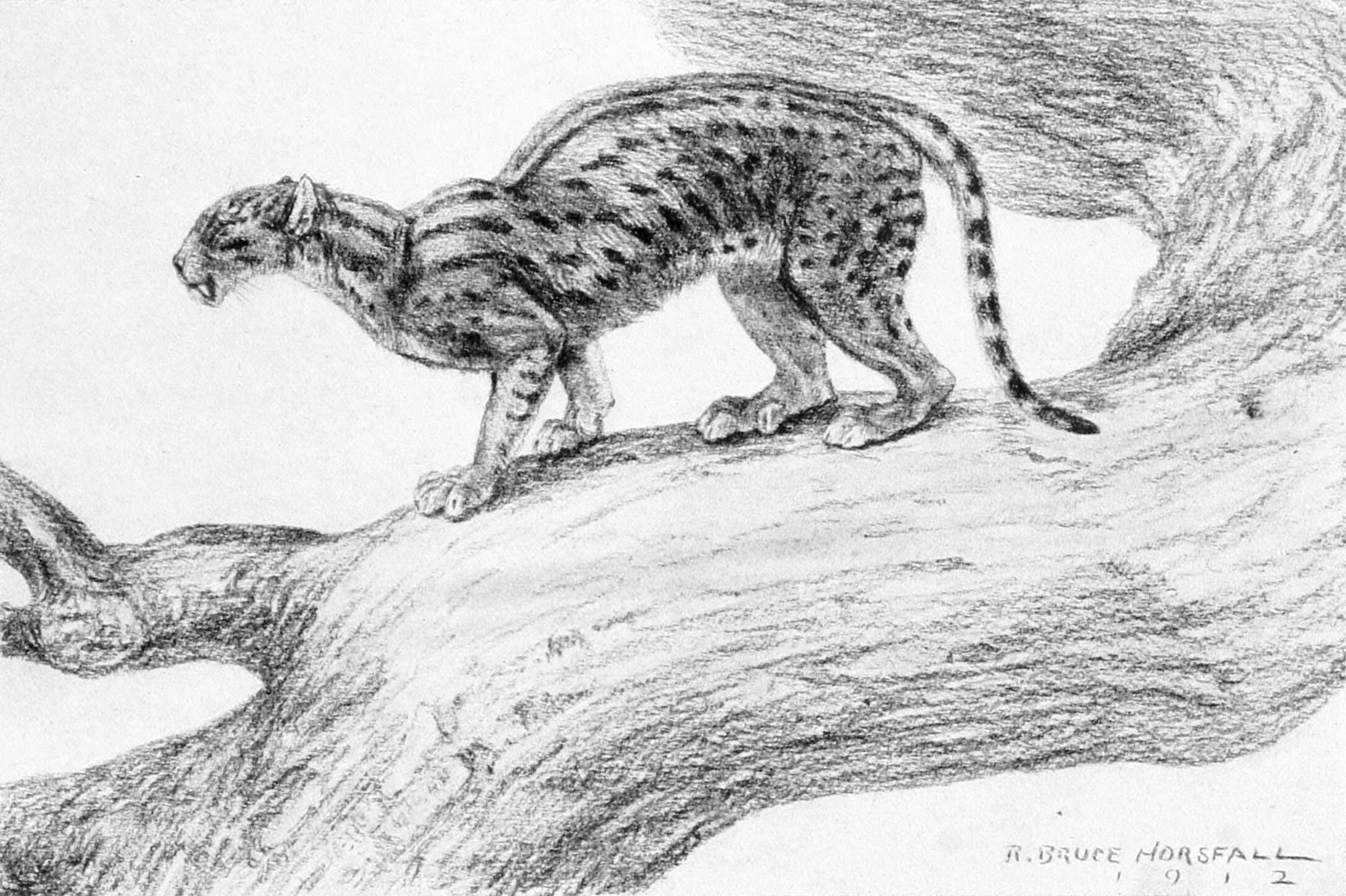
- Life restoration of the Eocene-Miocene false saber-toothed cat Dinictis. Robert Bruce Horsfall (1913).
  †Dinictis
  - †Dinictis cyclops
- †Diplobunops
  - †Diplobunops kardoula – type locality for species
- Diploclisia
  - †Diploclisia auriformis
- †Diplodipelta – type locality for genus
  - †Diplodipelta miocenica
  - †Diplodipelta reniptera
- Diplodonta
  - †Diplodonta parilis
- †Diploporus
  - †Diploporus torreyoides
- †Dipoides
  - †Dipoides smithi – type locality for species
  - †Dipoides stirtoni – type locality for species
  - †Dipoides vallicula
- †Diprionomys
  - †Diprionomys parvus
- Dipteronia
- Discinisca
  - †Discinisca oregonensis
- †Domninoides
- Dosinia
  - †Dosinia whitneyi
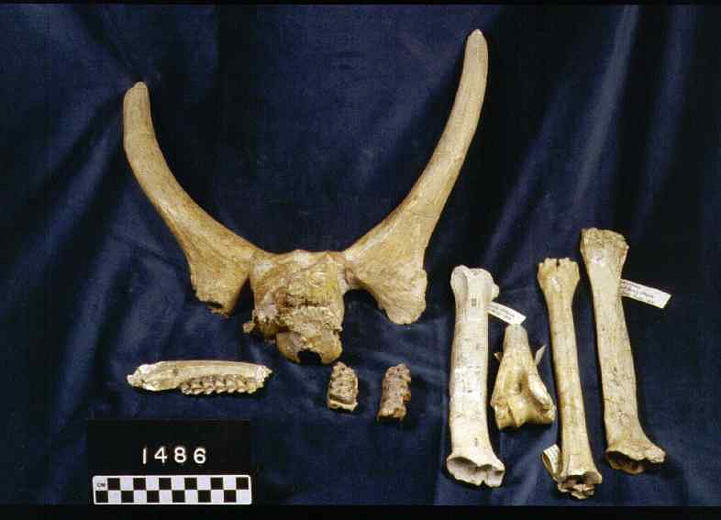
- Horns and other fossils attributed to Dromomeryx
  †Dromomeryx
  - †Dromomeryx borealis
- †Durocarpus
  - †Durocarpus cordatus
- †Dyticonastis – type locality for genus
  - †Dyticonastis rensbergeri – type locality for species

== E ==
- Echinophoria
  - †Echinophoria dalli
- †Ectinochilus
  - †Ectinochilus macilenta
- †Ekgmowechashala
- †Emmenopterys
  - †Emmenopterys dilcheri
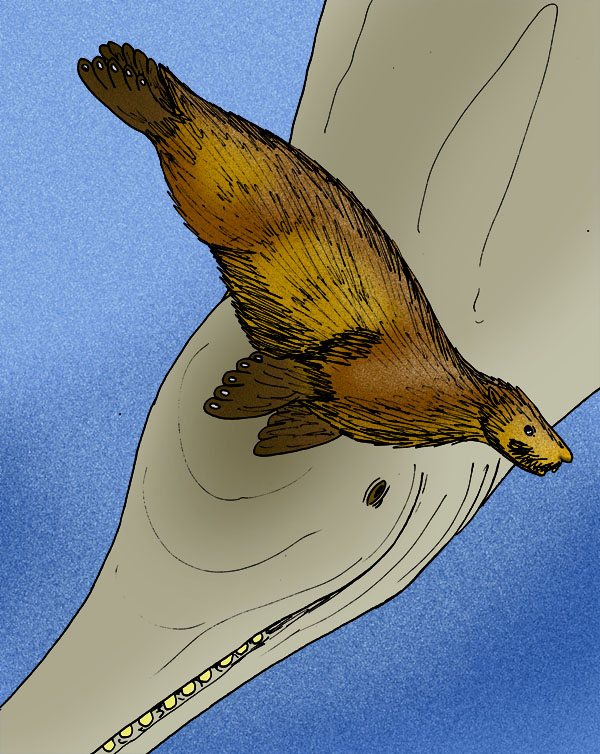
- Life restoration of the Oligocene-Miocene Enaliarctos and the toothed whale Macrodelphinus (background)
  †Enaliarctos
  - †Enaliarctos barnesi – type locality for species
  - †Enaliarctos emlongi – type locality for species
  - †Enaliarctos mitchelli
  - †Enaliarctos tedfordi – type locality for species
- Engelhardia
  - †Engelhardia olsoni
- Enhydra
- †Enhydrocyon
  - †Enhydrocyon prolatus
  - †Enhydrocyon stenocephalus
- Ennucula
  - †Ennucula nuculana
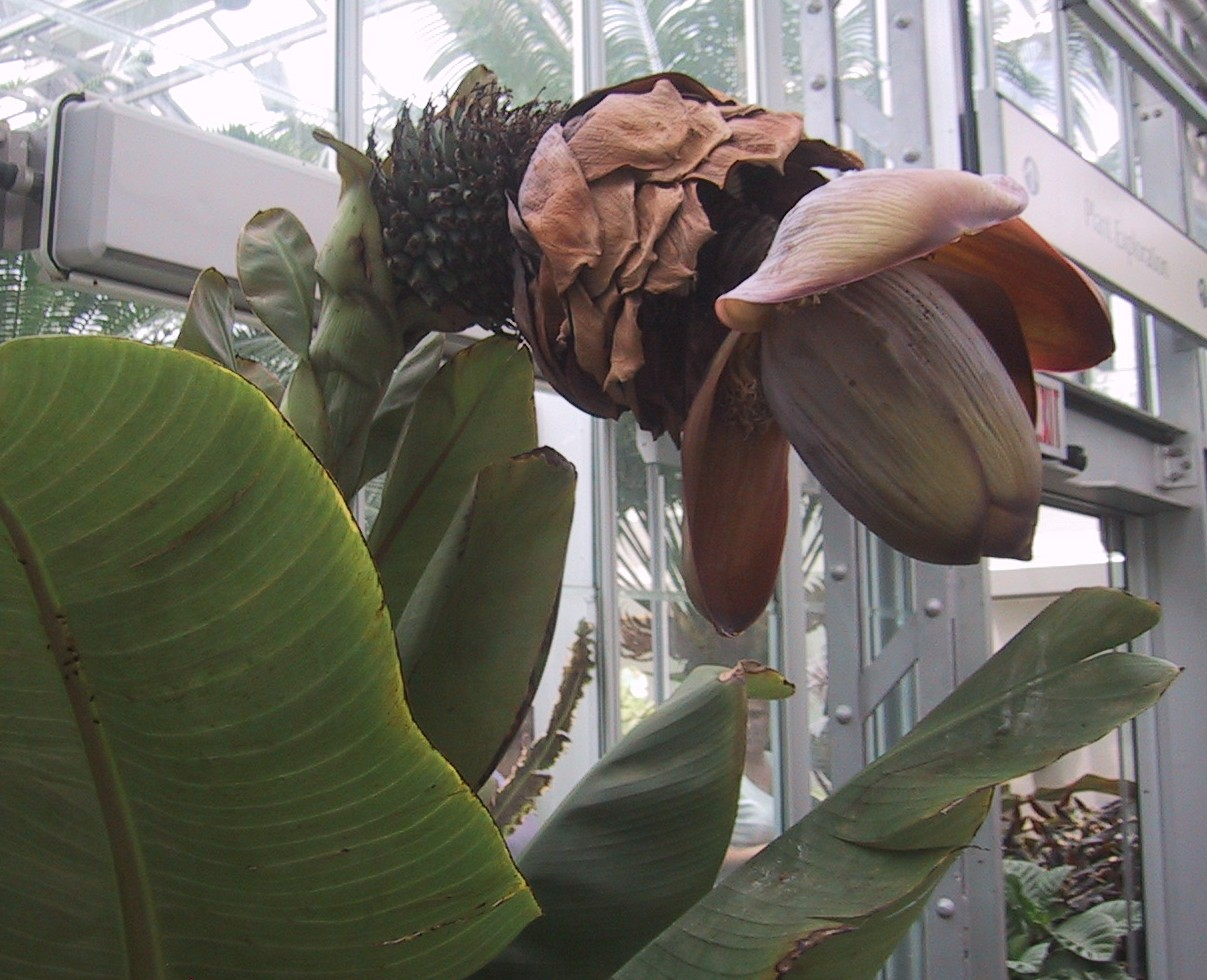
- Ensete
  †Ensete
  - †Ensete oregonense – type locality for species
- †Entoptychus
  - †Entoptychus individens
  - †Entoptychus planifrons
  - †Entoptychus wheelerensis
- †Eohypserpa
  - †Eohypserpa scottii
- †Eopleurotoma
  - †Eopleurotoma ornata – or unidentified related form
- †Eosiphonalia
  - †Eosiphonalia oregonensis
- Epacroleda – report made of unidentified related form or using admittedly obsolete nomenclature
  - †Epacroleda epacris
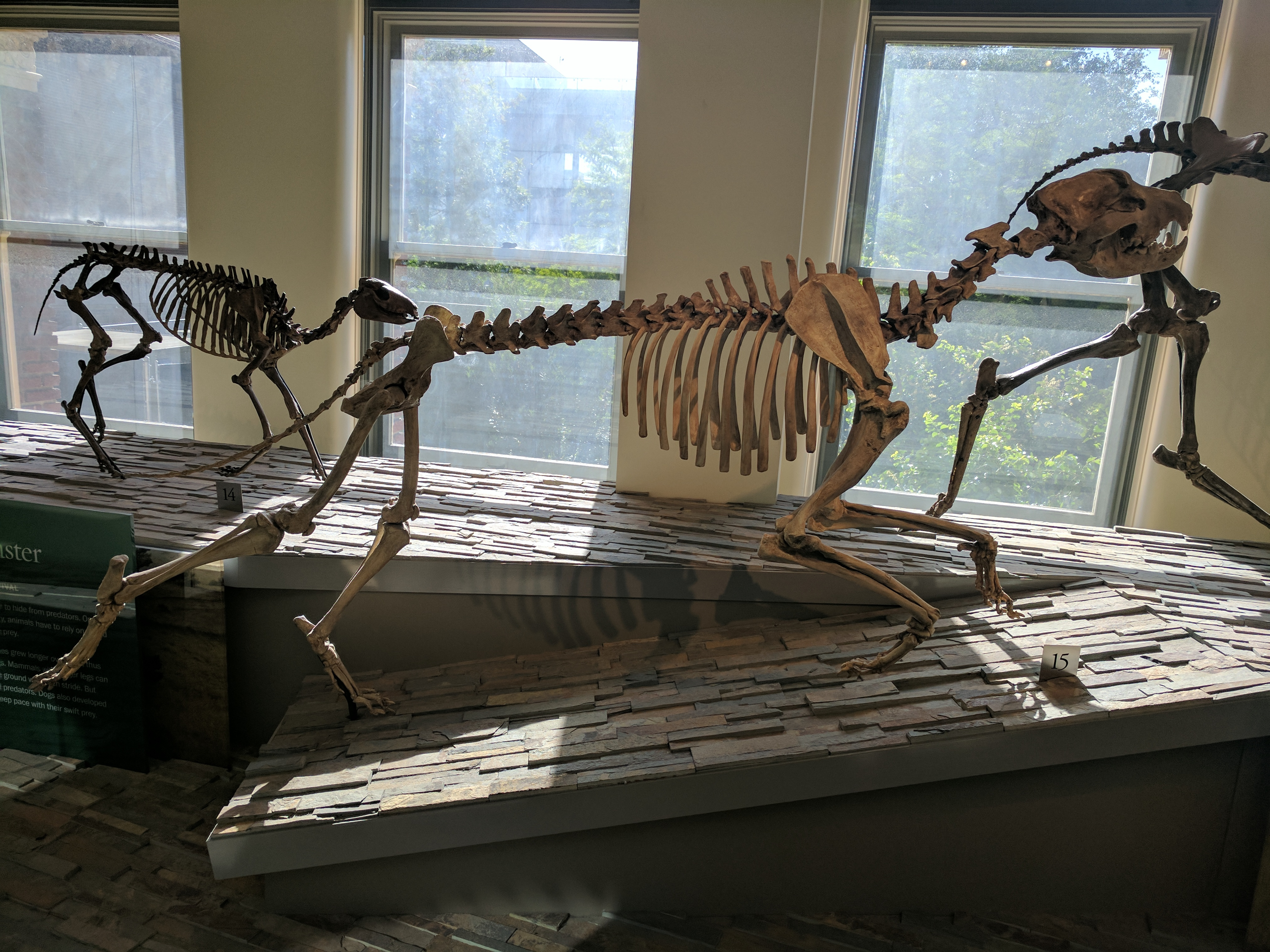
- Mounted fossilized skeleton of the Miocene bone-crushing dog Epicyon
  †Epicyon
  - †Epicyon haydeni
  - †Epicyon saevus
- †Epihippus
  - †Epihippus gracilis
- Epilucina
  - †Epilucina washingtoniana
- Epitonium
  - †Epitonium condoni
  - †Epitonium hindsii
  - †Epitonium keaseyense
  - †Epitonium keaseyensis
  - †Epitonium schencki
  - †Epitonium wyattdurhami – type locality for species
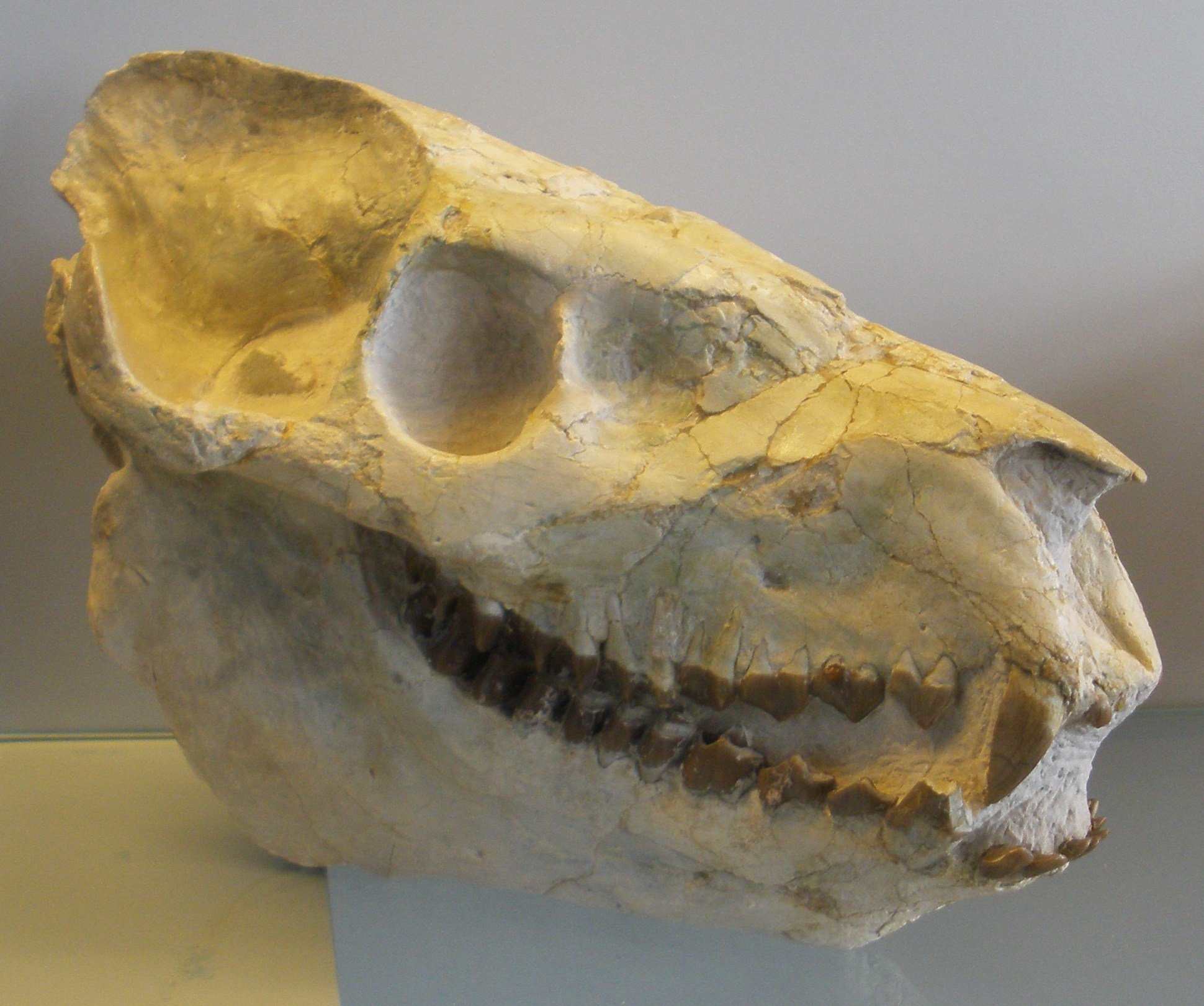
- Fossilized skull of the Oligocene-Miocene oreodont mammal Eporeodon
  †Eporeodon
  - †Eporeodon occidentalis
  - †Eporeodon trigonocephalus
- †Equisetum
- Equus
  - †Equus pacificus
- †Eremochen – type locality for genus
  - †Eremochen russelli – type locality for species
- †Erismatura
  - †Erismatura jamaicensis
- Erolia
  - †Erolia melanotos
- Ervilia – tentative report
  - †Ervilia oregonensis
- †Eschatius
- †Eubrontotherium – type locality for genus
  - †Eubrontotherium clarnoensis – type locality for species
- †Eucastor
  - †Eucastor malheurensis
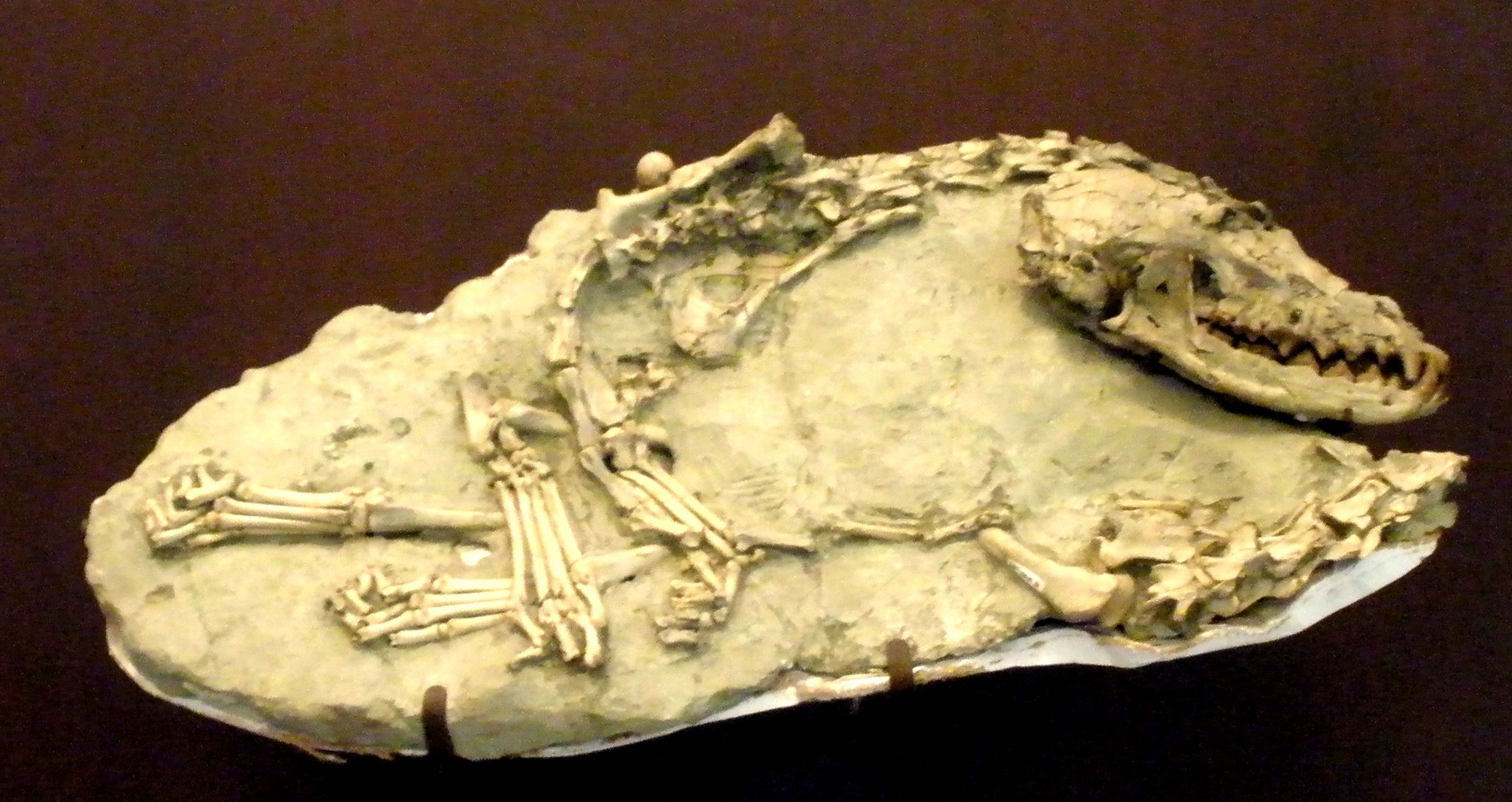
- Fossilized skeleton of the Miocene-Pliocene coyote-like canine Eucyon
  †Eucyon
  - †Eucyon davisi
- †Euoplocyon
  - †Euoplocyon brachygnathus
- Euphagus
  - †Euphagus cyanocephalus
- Eurytellina
  - †Eurytellina aduncanasa
- Euspira
  - †Euspira clementensis
  - †Euspira hotsoni
  - †Euspira nuciformis
  - †Euspira pallida
- †Eutrephoceras
  - †Eutrephoceras oregonense
- Exbucklandia
  - †Exbucklandia oregonensis
- †Exilia
  - †Exilia bentsonae – type locality for species
  - †Exilia lincolnensis

== F ==
- Fagus
  - †Fagus pacifica
- Falco
  - †Falco oregonus – type locality for species
- Felaniella
  - †Felaniella snavelyi
- Ferminoscala
  - †Ferminoscala dickersoni
- †Ferrignocarpus
  - †Ferrignocarpus bivalvis
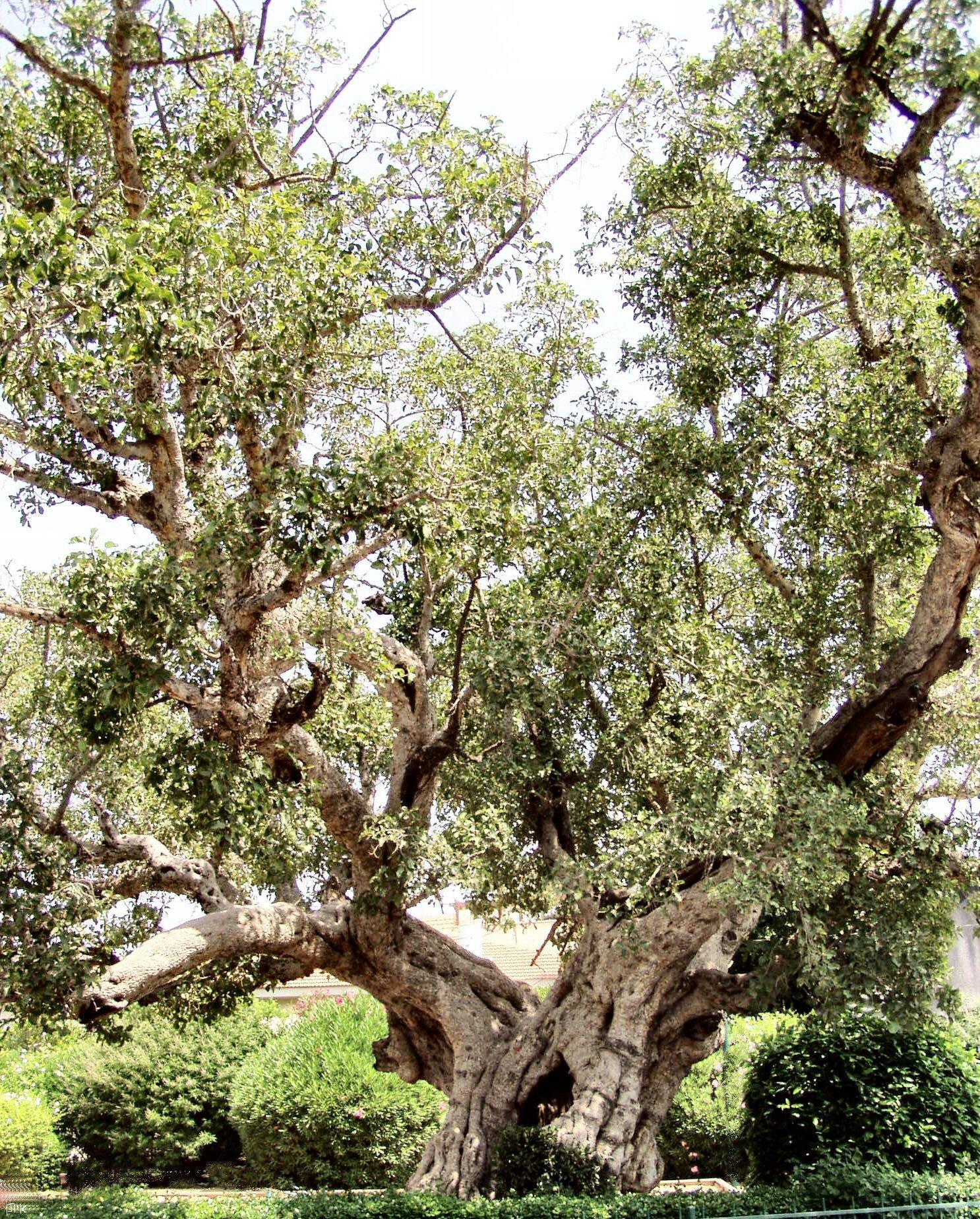
- A living Ficus, or fig tree
  Ficus
  - †Ficus modesta
  - †Ficus ocoyanum – or unidentified comparable form
- Fimbria
- †Fimbrialata
  - †Fimbrialata wingii
- Flabellum
  - †Flabellum oregonense – type locality for species
- †Flectorivus
  - †Flectorivus microdontos
- †Florentiamys
- †Floridaceras
  - †Floridaceras whitei
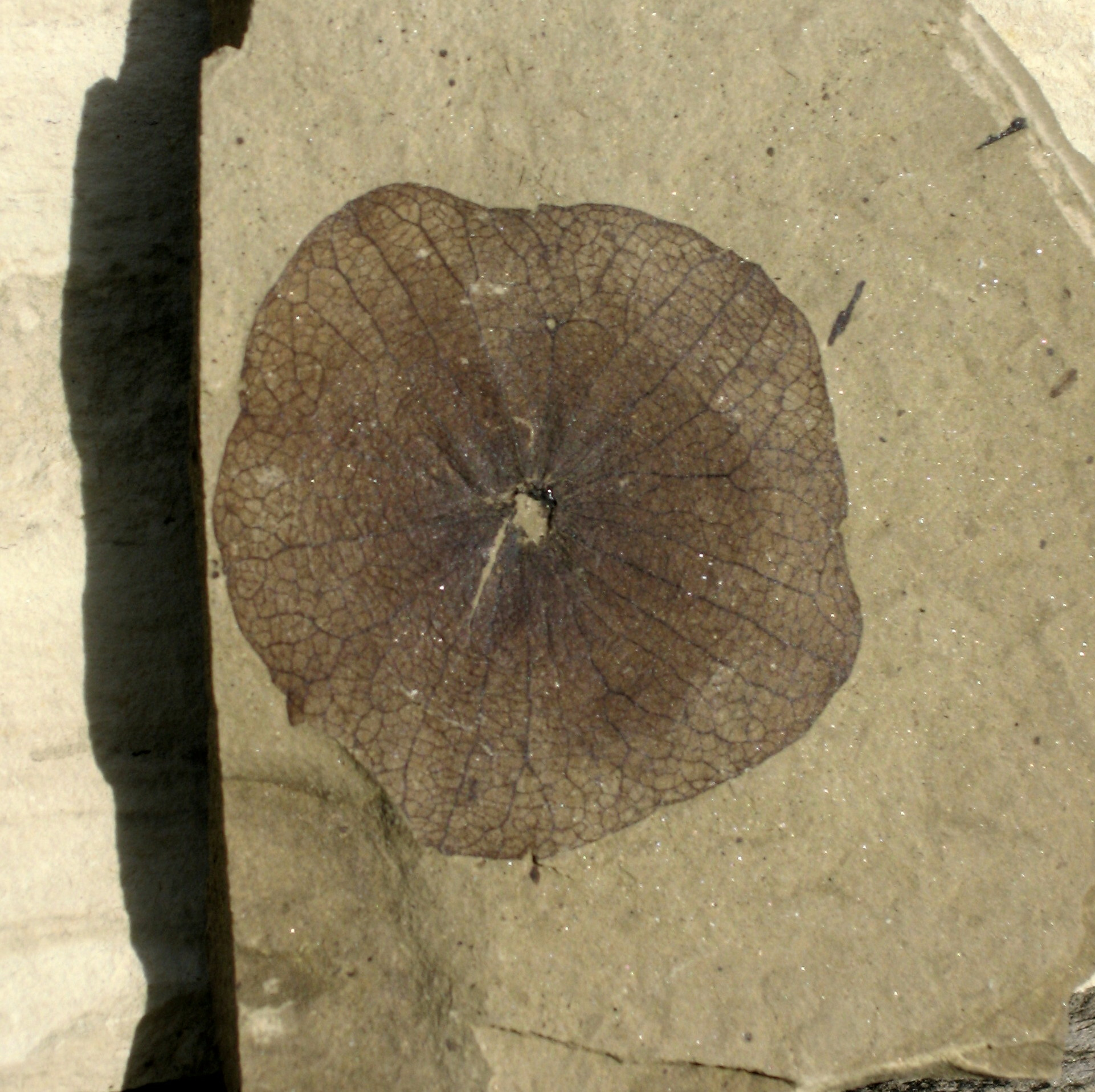
- Flower of the Eocene-Oligocene cocoa relative Florissantia
  †Florissantia
  - †Florissantia ashwillii – type locality for species
  - †Florissantia speirii
- †Fokieniopsis
  - †Fokieniopsis praedecurrens
- †Fortunearites
  - †Fortunearites endressii
- †Fothergilla
  - †Fothergilla praeovata
- †Fragarites
  - †Fragarites ramificans
- †Fraxinus
  - †Fraxinus coulteri
- Fulgoraria
  - †Fulgoraria indurata
- Fulgurofusus
  - †Fulgurofusus serratus – type locality for species
- Fulica
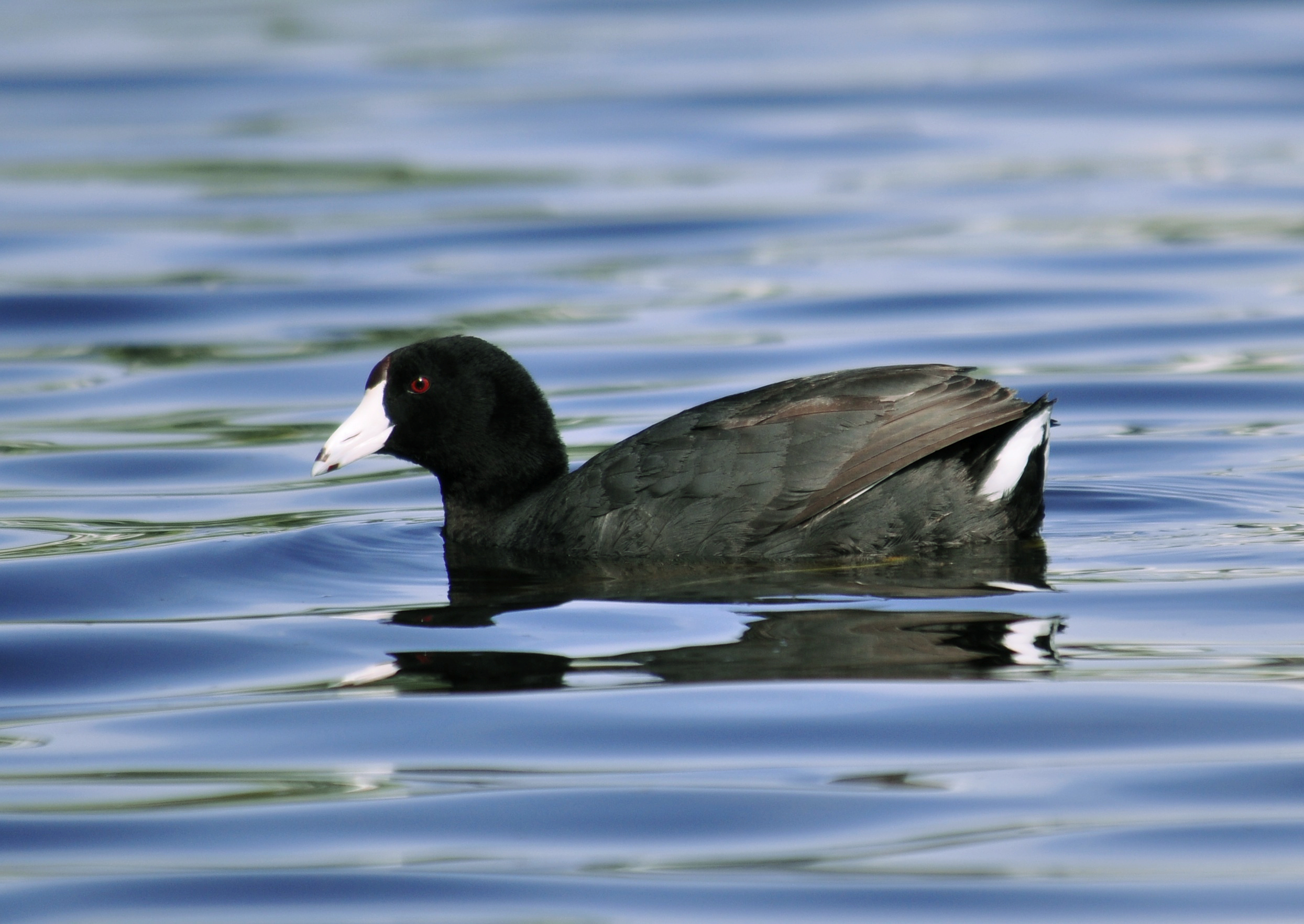
  - A living Fulica americana, or American coot
    Fulica americana
  - †Fulica infelix – type locality for species
  - †Fulica minor – type locality for species
- †Fusinis
  - †Fusinis dilleri – type locality for species
- Fusinus
  - †Fusinus coosensis
  - †Fusinus dilleri

== G ==
- †Gagaria
  - †Gagaria crenularis – type locality for species
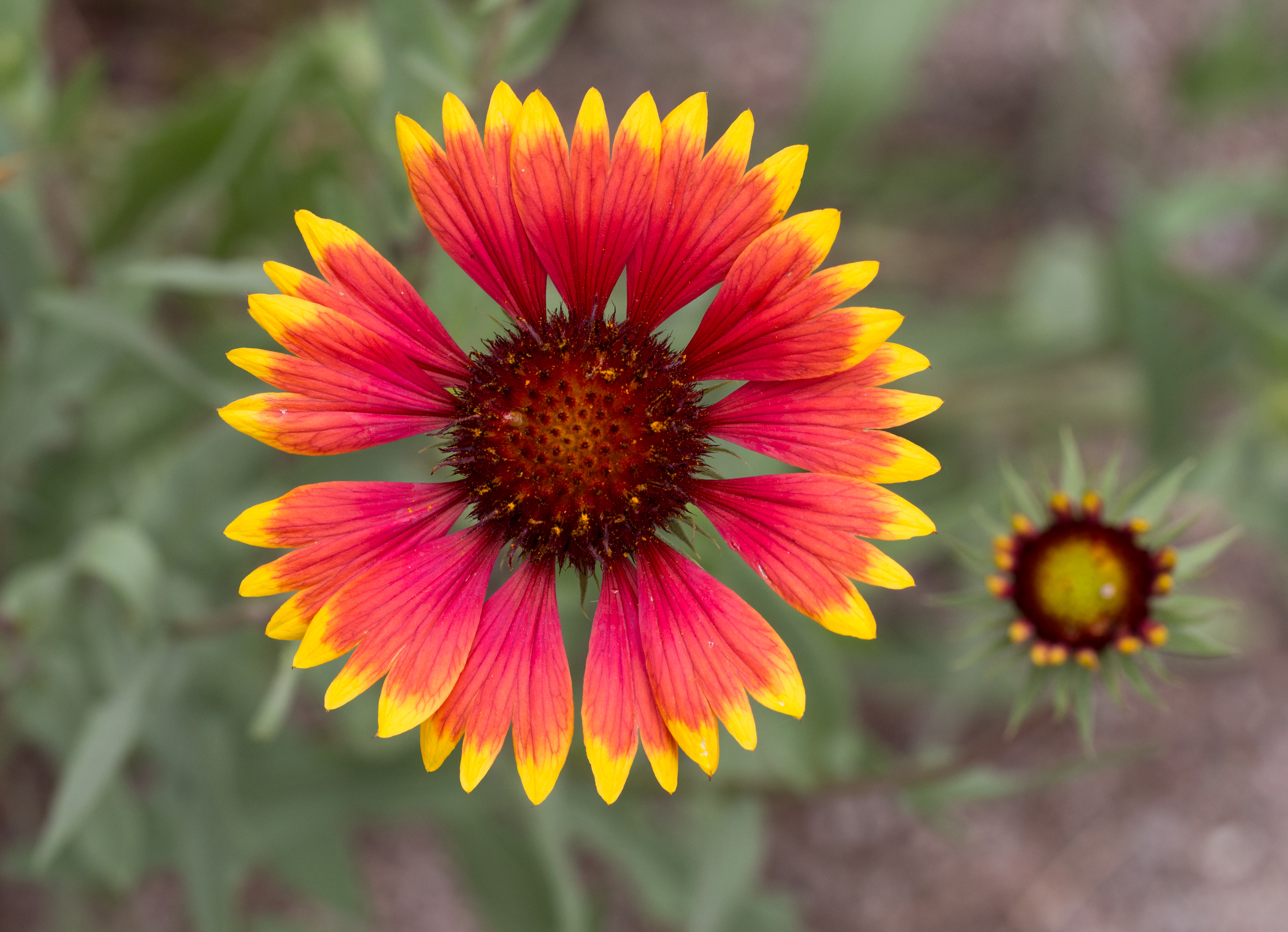
- A living Gaillardia, or blanket flower
  †Gaillardia
  - †Gaillardia thomsoni
- Gari – tentative report
  - †Gari furcata – or unidentified related form
- Gemmula
  - †Gemmula bentsonae
  - †Gemmula facula
  - †Gemmula rockcreekensis
- †Gentilicamelus
  - †Gentilicamelus cameloides – type locality for species
  - †Gentilicamelus sternbergi
- Glaucionetta
  - †Glaucionetta islandica
- †Globulicarpium
  - †Globulicarpium levigatum
- Glycymeris
  - †Glycymeris major
  - †Glycymeris sagittata
  - †Glycymeris septentrionalis
- Glyptocidaris
- †Goedertius – type locality for genus
  - †Goedertius oregonensis – type locality for species
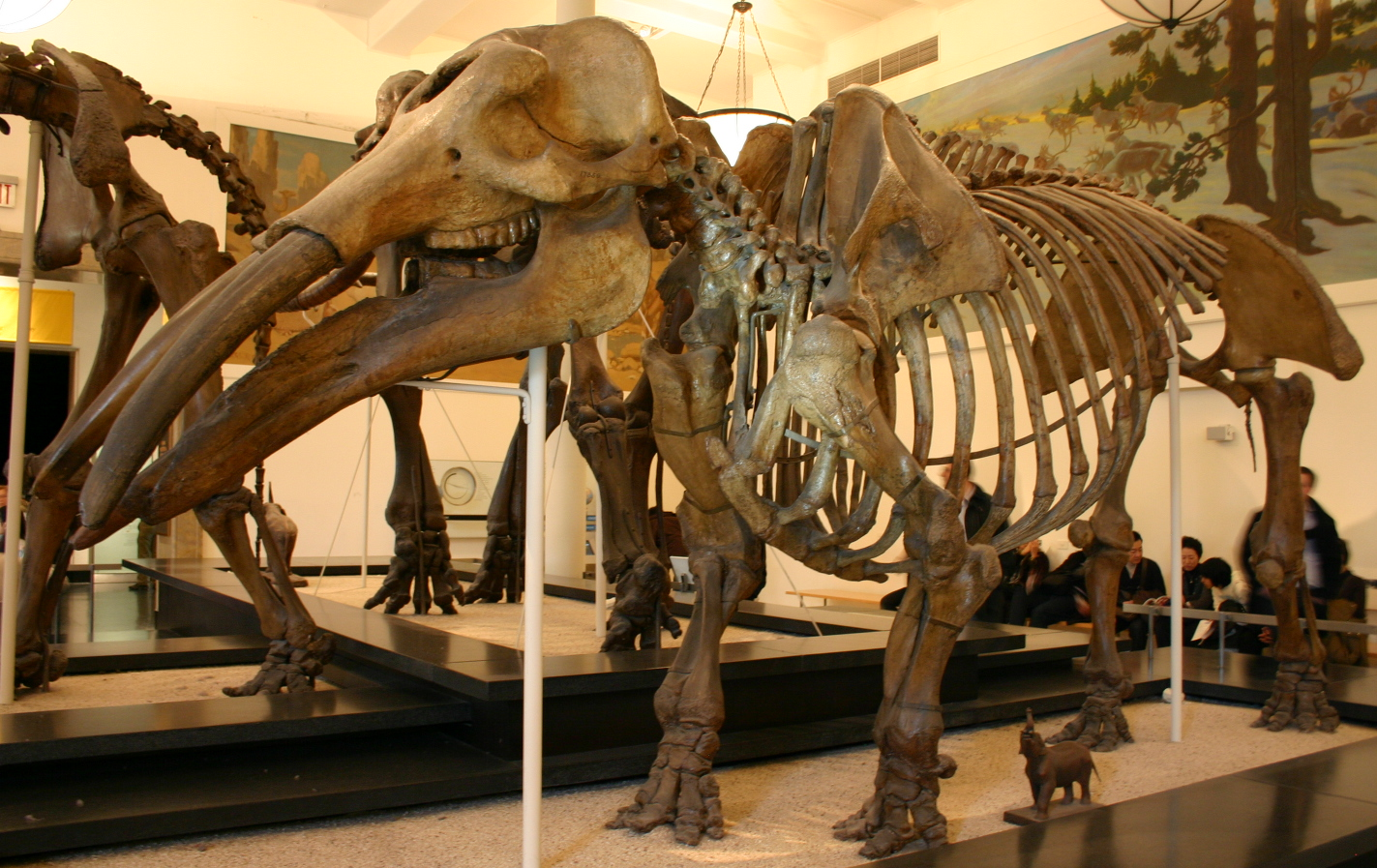
- Mounted fossilized skeleton of the Miocene-Pleistocene elephant relative Gomphotherium
  †Gomphotherium
  - †Gomphotherium obscurum
- †Goniodontomys
  - †Goniodontomys disjunctus – type locality for species
- Granula
  - †Granula profundorum – type locality for species
- Gyrineum – report made of unidentified related form or using admittedly obsolete nomenclature
  - †Gyrineum dilleri

== H ==
- †Hadrianus
- Halesia
  - †Halesia oregona
- Haliaeetus
  - †Haliaeetus leucocephalus
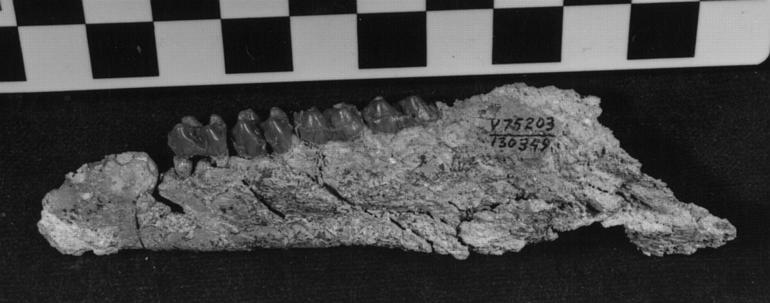
- Fossilized mandible of the Eocene horse Haplohippus
  †Haplohippus
  - †Haplohippus texanus
- †Haplomys
  - †Haplomys liolophus
- †Hemiauchenia – tentative report
- †Hemipsalodon
  - †Hemipsalodon grandis
- Hemithiris
  - †Hemithiris psittacea
- †Heptacodon
- Heptranchias
  - †Heptranchias howelli
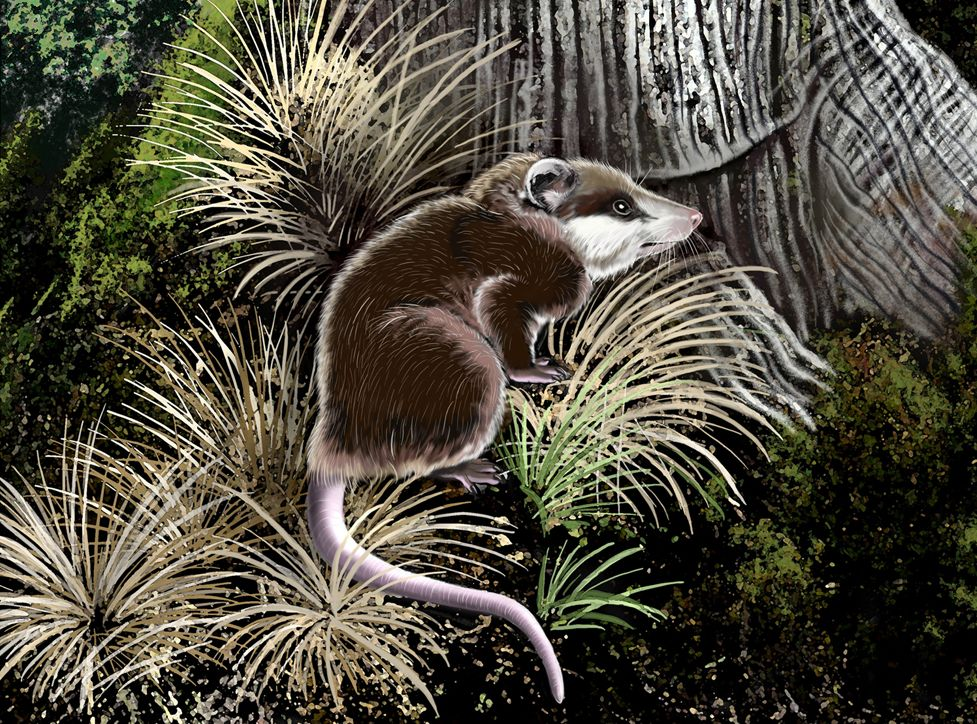
- Life restoration of the Eocene-Miocene mammal Herpetotherium
  †Herpetotherium
  - †Herpetotherium merriami
- †Hesperhys – or unidentified comparable form
- †Hesperogaulus
  - †Hesperogaulus gazini – type locality for species
  - †Hesperogaulus wilsoni – type locality for species
- †Hesperolagomys
  - †Hesperolagomys galbreathi – or unidentified comparable form
- †Hesperosorex – tentative report
- Heteropora
- †Hexacarpellites
  - †Hexacarpellites hallii
- Hiatella
- Himantopus
  - †Himantopus mexicanus
- †Hippotherium
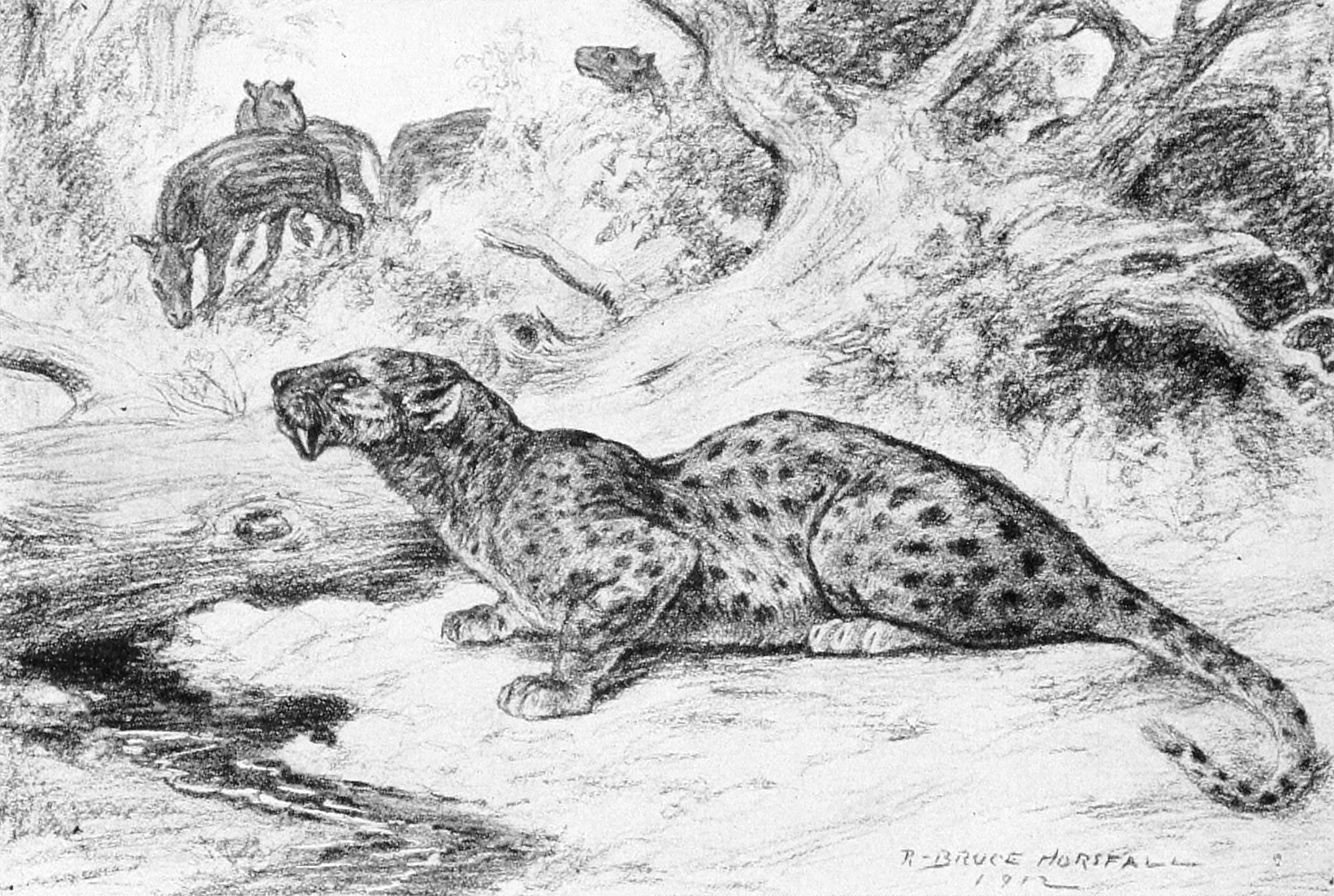
- Life restoration of the Eocene-Oligocene false saber-toothed cat Hoplophoneus. Robert Bruce Horsfall (1913).
  †Hoplophoneus
  - †Hoplophoneus cerebralis
  - †Hoplophoneus strigidens
- †Hovenia
  - †Hovenia oregonensis
- Hydrangea
  - †Hydrangea knowltonii
- †Hydrochelidon
  - †Hydrochelidon nigra
- †Hypertragulus
  - †Hypertragulus calcaratus
  - †Hypertragulus hesperius
  - †Hypertragulus planiceps
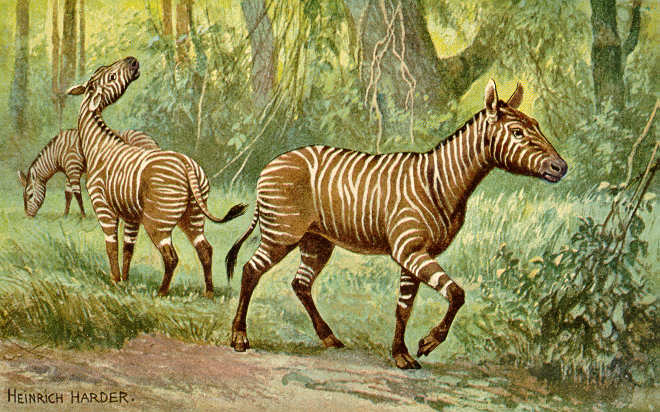
- Life restoration of the Miocene horse Hypohippus. Heinrich Harder (1920).
  †Hypohippus
  - †Hypohippus osborni
- †Hypolagus
  - †Hypolagus fontinalis
  - †Hypolagus oregonensis – type locality for species
  - †Hypolagus vetus
- †Hypomorphnus
  - †Hypomorphnus sodalis – tentative report
- †Hypsidoris
  - †Hypsidoris oregonensis – type locality for species
- †Hypsiops
  - †Hypsiops breviceps
- †Hyrachyus
  - †Hyrachyus eximius
- †Hystricops
  - †Hystricops browni

== I ==
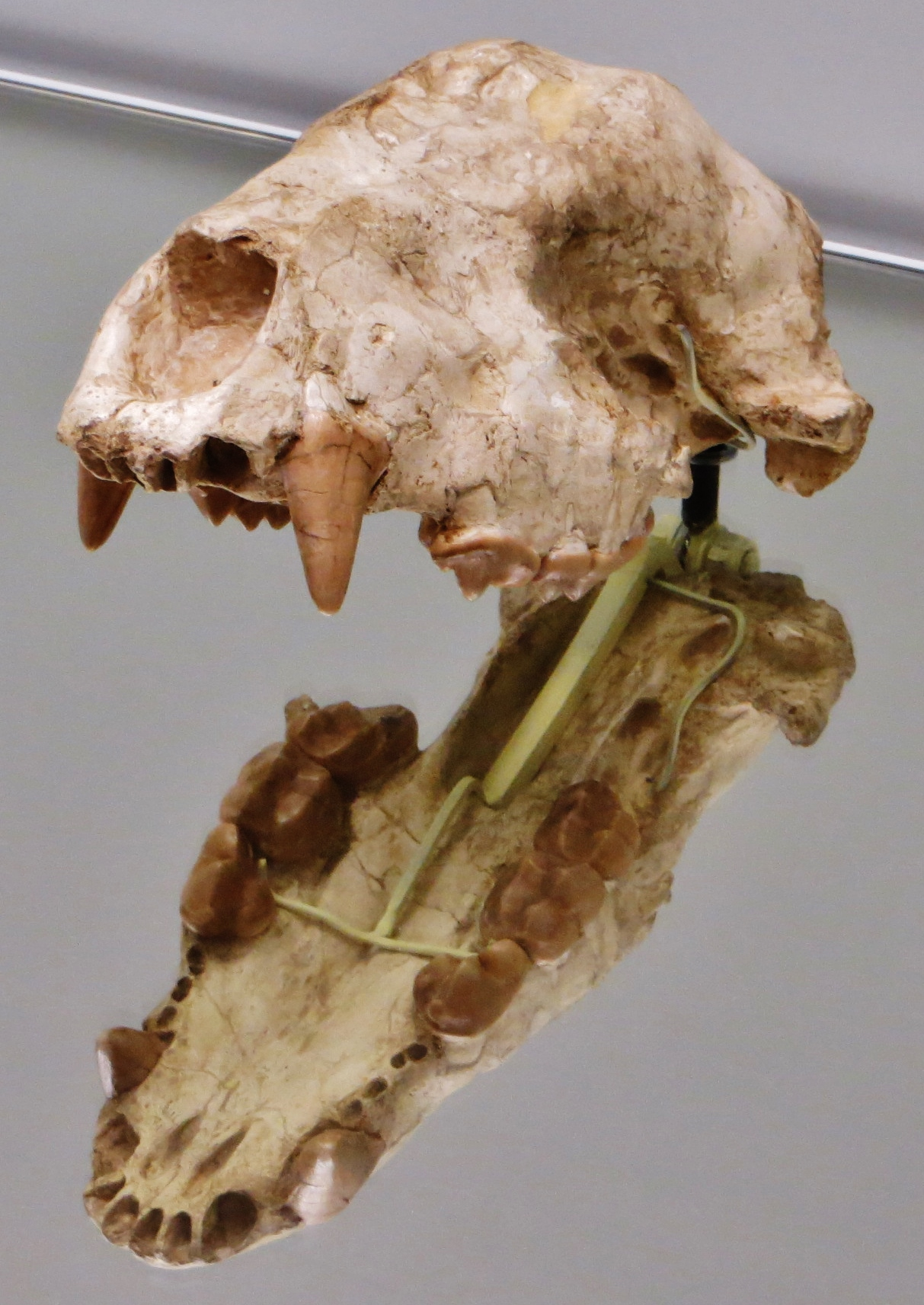
- Fossilized skull of the Miocene bear Indarctos
  †Indarctos
  - †Indarctos oregonensis – type locality for species
- †Ingentisorex
  - †Ingentisorex tumididens
- †Iodes
  - †Iodes chandlerae
  - †Iodes multirecticulata
- †Iodicarpa
  - †Iodicarpa ampla
  - †Iodicarpa lenticularis
- Isocrinus
- Isurus
  - †Isurus planus

== J ==
- †Jimomys
  - †Jimomys lulli
- †Joejonesia
  - †Joejonesia globosa
- †Juglandiphyllites
  - †Juglandiphyllites cryptatus
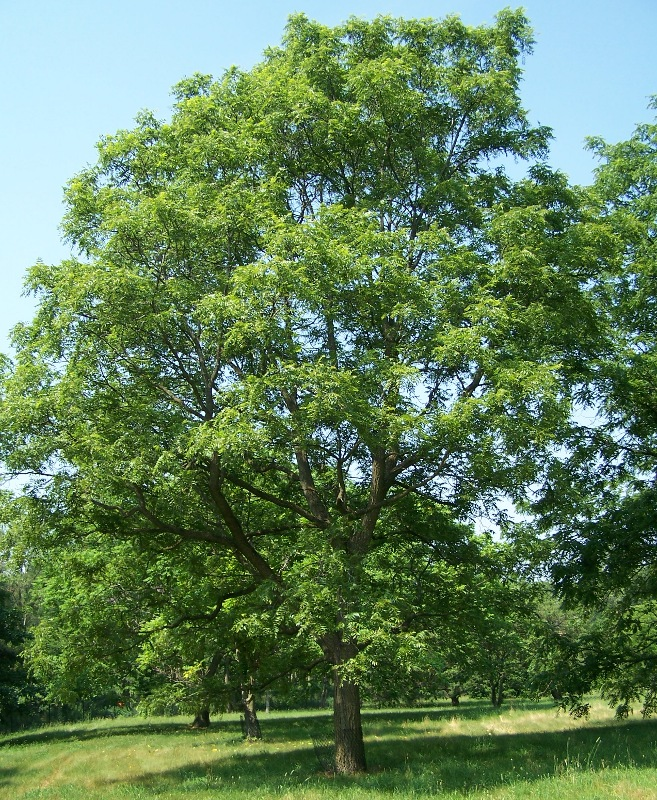
- A living Juglans, or walnut tree
  Juglans
  - †Juglans clarnensis
  - †Juglans wheelerensis

== K ==
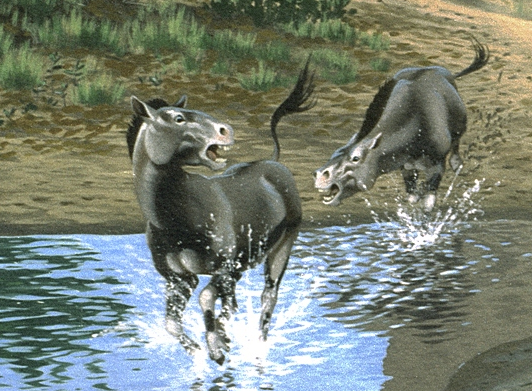
- Restoration of the Oligocene-Miocene horse Kalobatippus
  †Kalobatippus
- †Kardiasperma
  - †Kardiasperma parvum
- Katherinella
  - †Katherinella angustifrons
- †Keasius
  - †Keasius taylori – type locality for species
- Kellia
  - †Kellia saxiriva – type locality for species
  - †Kellia vokesi – type locality for species
- †Keteleeria
  - †Keteleeria rujadana
- †Kewia
  - †Kewia marquamensis – type locality for species
- †Kolponomos
  - †Kolponomos newportensis – type locality for species

== L ==
- Lacuna
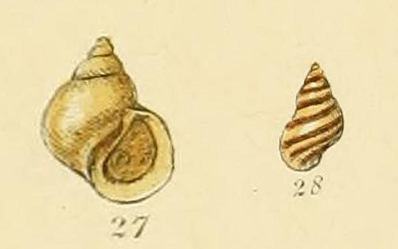
  - Illustration of shells in multiple views of Lacuna vincta, or northern lacuna sea snails
    †Lacuna vincta
- Lamelliconcha
  - †Lamelliconcha clarki
- †Langtonia
  - †Langtonia bisulcata
- †Lantanotherium
- Larus
  - †Larus argentatus
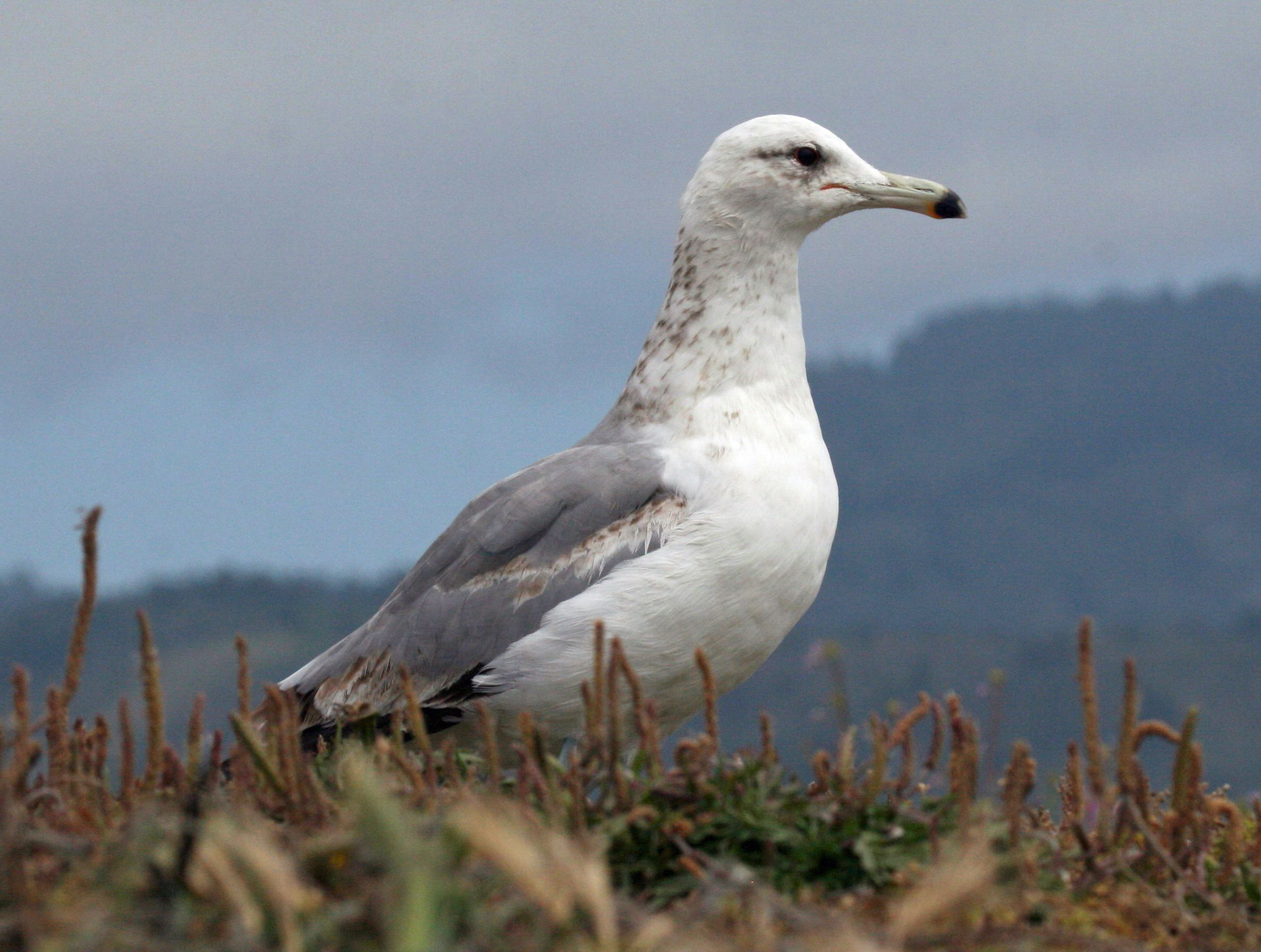
  - A living Larus californicus, or California gull
    †Larus californicus
  - †Larus oregonus – type locality for species
  - †Larus philadelphia
  - †Larus pristinus – type locality for species
  - †Larus robustus – type locality for species
- †Laurocalyx
  - †Laurocalyx wheelerae
- †Laurocarpum
  - †Laurocarpum hancockii
  - †Laurocarpum nutbedensis
  - †Laurocarpum raisinoides
- †Leguminocarpon
- †Leidymys
- Lepeta
  - †Lepeta concentrica
- †Leptarctus
  - †Leptarctus oregonensis
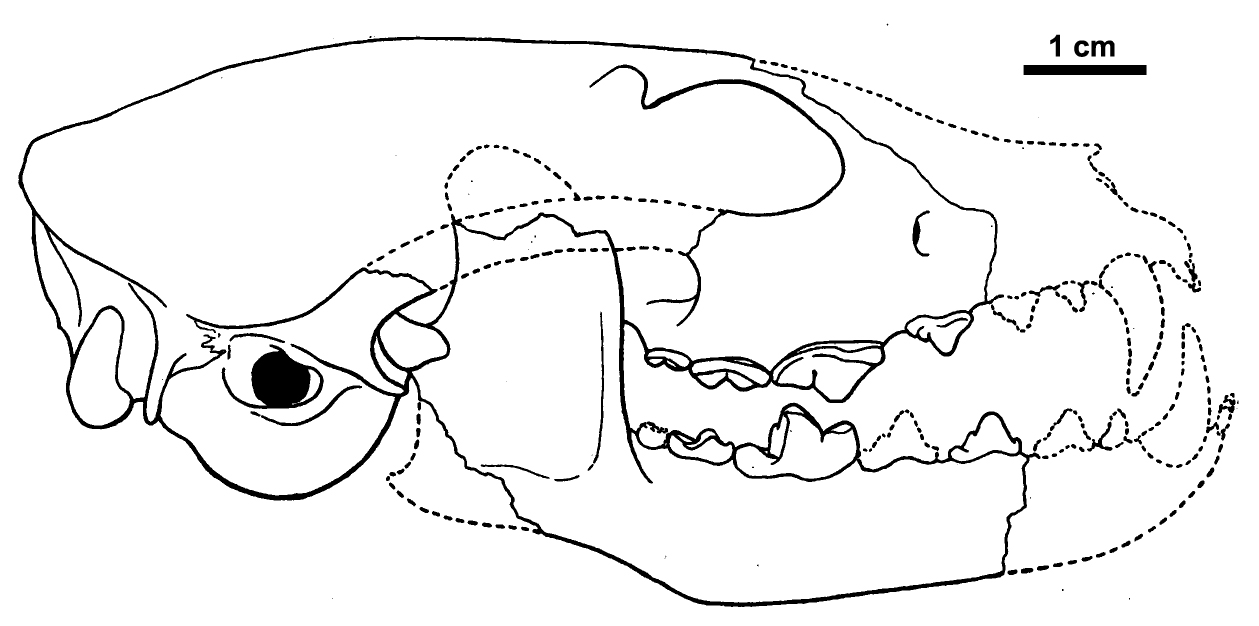
- Illustration of a fossilized skull of the Oligocene-Miocene dog Leptocyon
  †Leptocyon
  - †Leptocyon douglassi
  - †Leptocyon mollis
  - †Leptocyon vulpinus
- †Leptodontomys
  - †Leptodontomys oregonensis – type locality for species
  - †Leptodontomys quartzi
- Lepus
  - †Lepus ennisianus
- Leukoma
  - †Leukoma staminea
- †Lignicarpus
  - †Lignicarpus crassimuri
- †Ligniglobus
  - †Ligniglobus sinuosifibrae
- †Limicolavis
  - †Limicolavis pluvianella – type locality for species
- Limnodromus
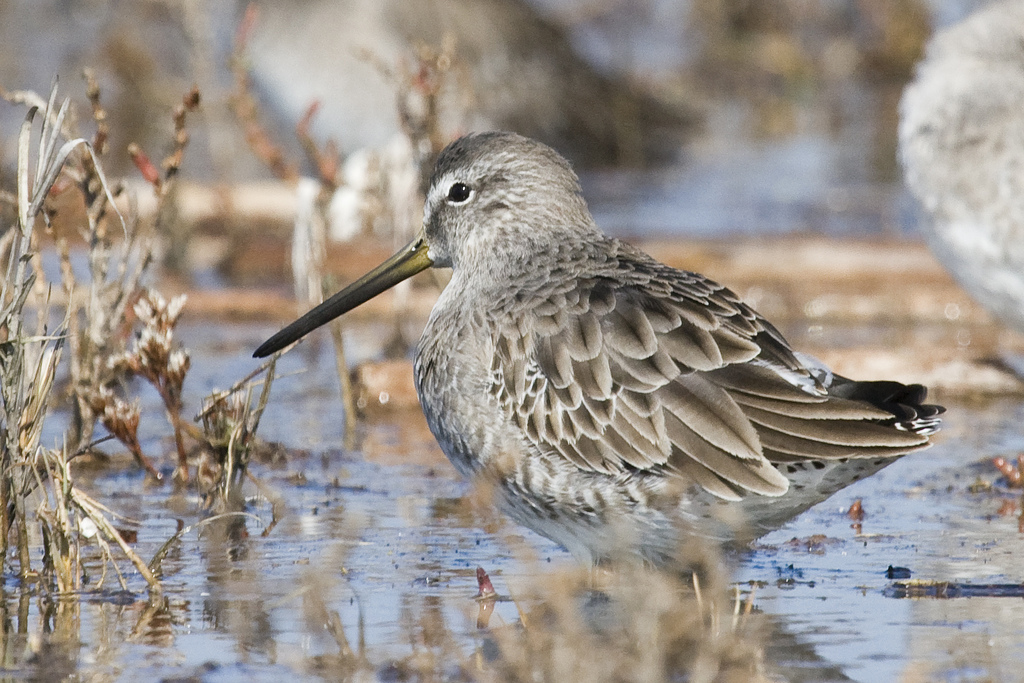
  - A living Limnodromus griseus, or short-billed dowitcher
    †Limnodromus griseus – tentative report
- †Limnoecus
  - †Limnoecus tricuspis – or unidentified comparable form
- Lindera
  - †Lindera clarnensis
  - †Lindera oregona
- †Liodontia
  - †Liodontia alexandrae
  - †Liodontia furlongi
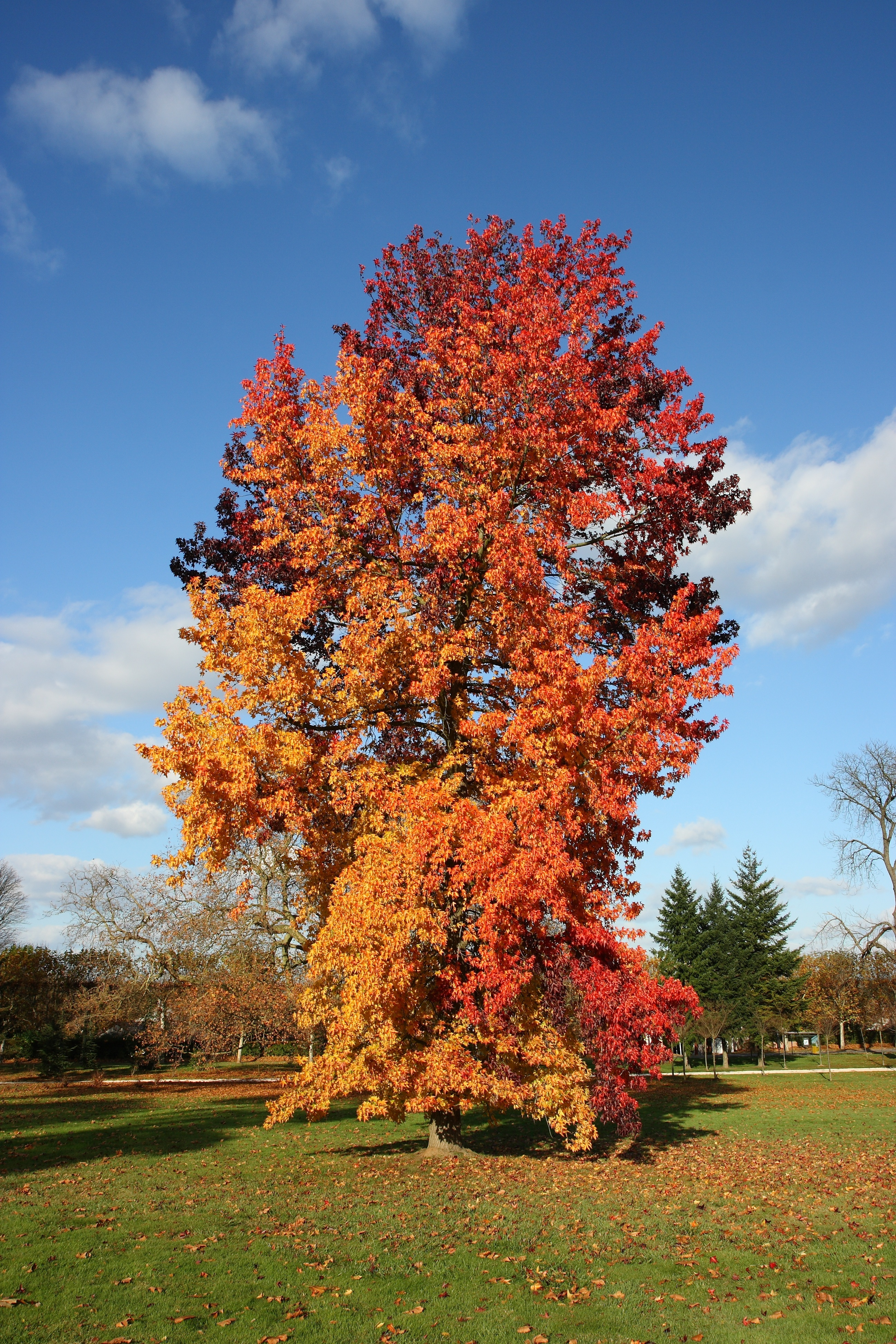
- The autumn foliage of a living Liquidambar, or sweetgum tree
  Liquidambar
- †Liracassis
  - †Liracassis petrosa
- †Litheuphaea – type locality for genus
  - †Litheuphaea carpenteri – type locality for species
- †Lithocarpus
  - †Lithocarpus klamathensis
- †Litorhadia
  - †Litorhadia astoriana
  - †Litorhadia washingtonensis
  - †Litorhadia washingtoni
- †Litseaphyllum
  - †Litseaphyllum presanguinea
- Littorina
  - †Littorina remondi
- †Lobipes
  - †Lobipes lobatus
- Lophodytes
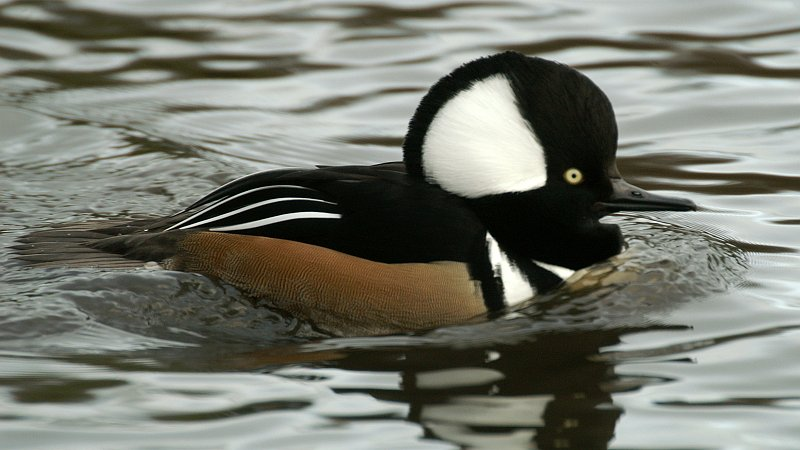
  - A living Lophodytes cucullatus, or hooded merganser
    †Lophodytes cucullatus
- †Lophopanopeus
  - †Lophopanopeus baldwini – type locality for species
- †Lophortyx
  - †Lophortyx shotwelli – type locality for species
- Lucinoma
  - †Lucinoma acutilineata
  - †Lucinoma columbiana
- †Lunaticarpa
  - †Lunaticarpa curvistriata
- †Lutravus
  - †Lutravus halli – or unidentified comparable form
- Lynx
  - †Lynx longignathus
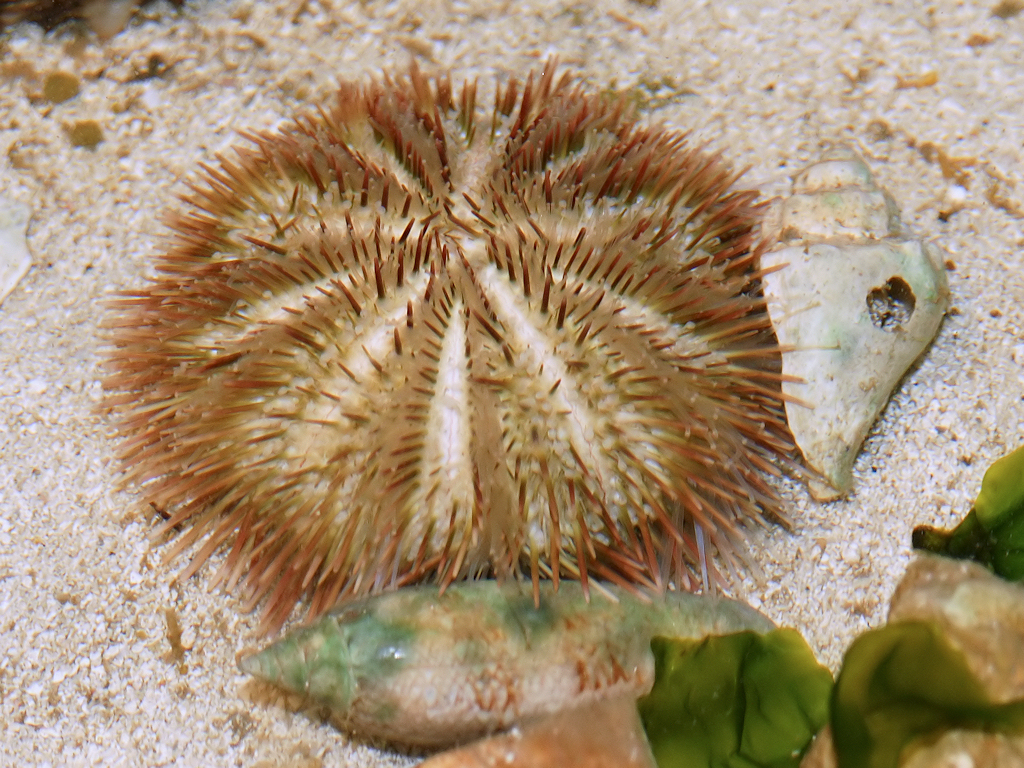
- A living Lytechinus sea urchin
  Lytechinus
  - †Lytechinus baldwini – type locality for species

== M ==
- †Macginicarpa
  - †Macginicarpa glabra
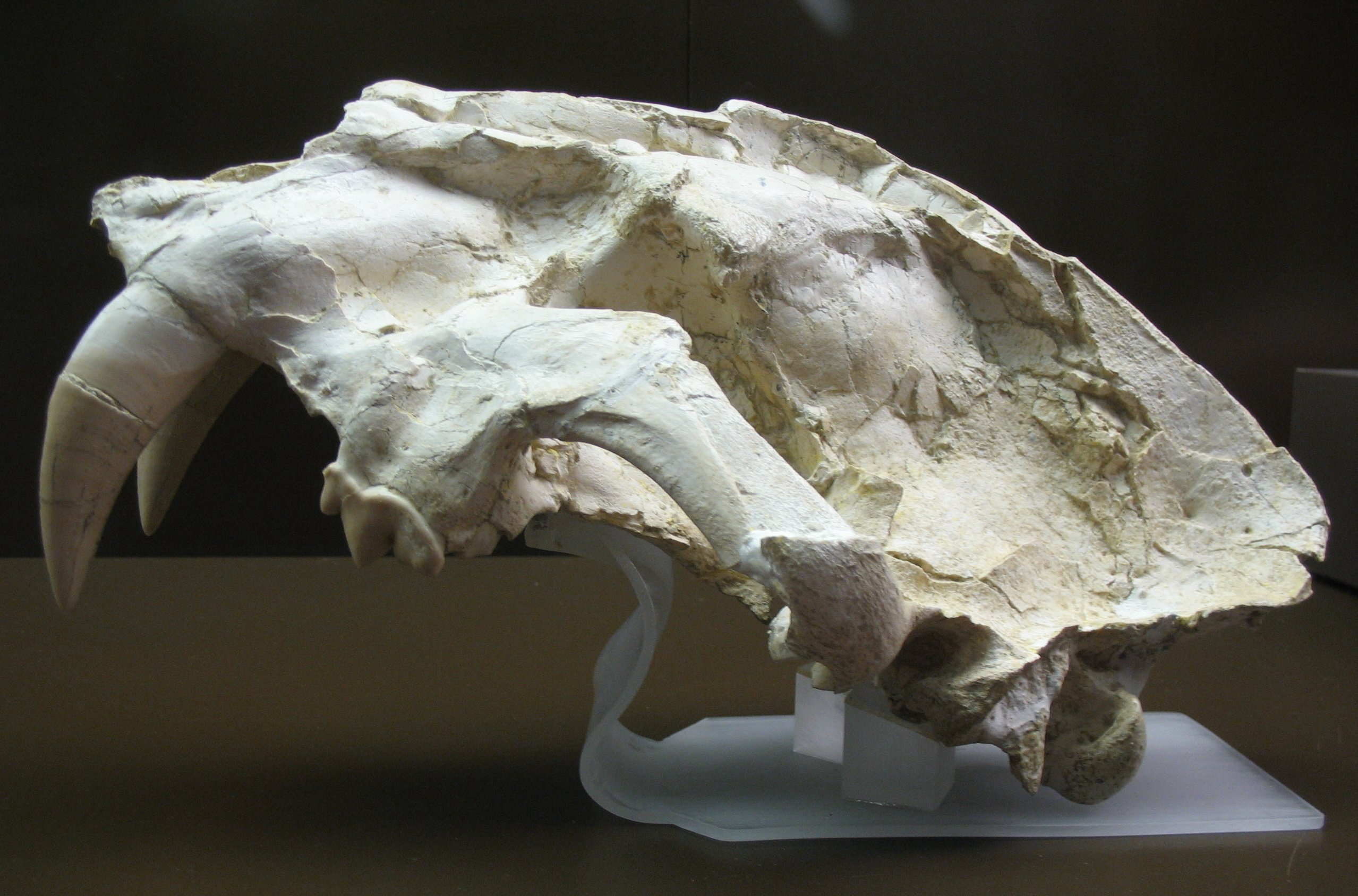
- Fossilized cranium of the Miocene-Pleistocene saber-toothed cat Machairodus
  †Machairodus
- †Machilus
  - †Machilus asiminoides
- Macoma
  - †Macoma albaria
  - †Macoma arcatata
  - †Macoma astori
  - †Macoma calcarea
  - †Macoma golikovi
  - †Macoma inquinata
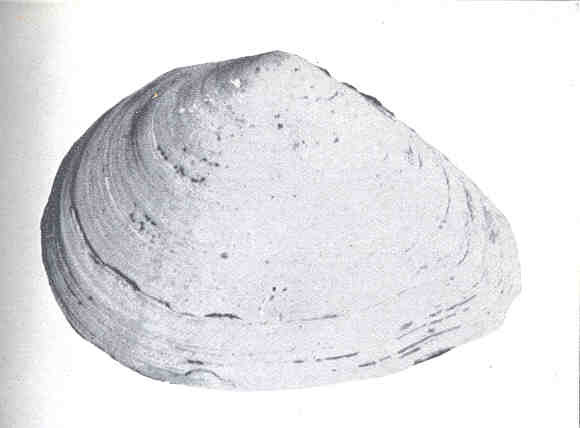
  - Shell of Macoma nasuta, or the bent-nosed clam
    †Macoma nasuta
  - †Macoma vancouverensis
- Macrocallista
  - †Macrocallista pittsburgensis
- †Macrognathomys
  - †Macrognathomys nanus
- Mactromeris
  - †Mactromeris albaria
  - †Mactromeris pittsburgensis
  - †Mactromeris polynyma
  - †Mactromeris ramonensis
  - †Mactromeris veneriformis
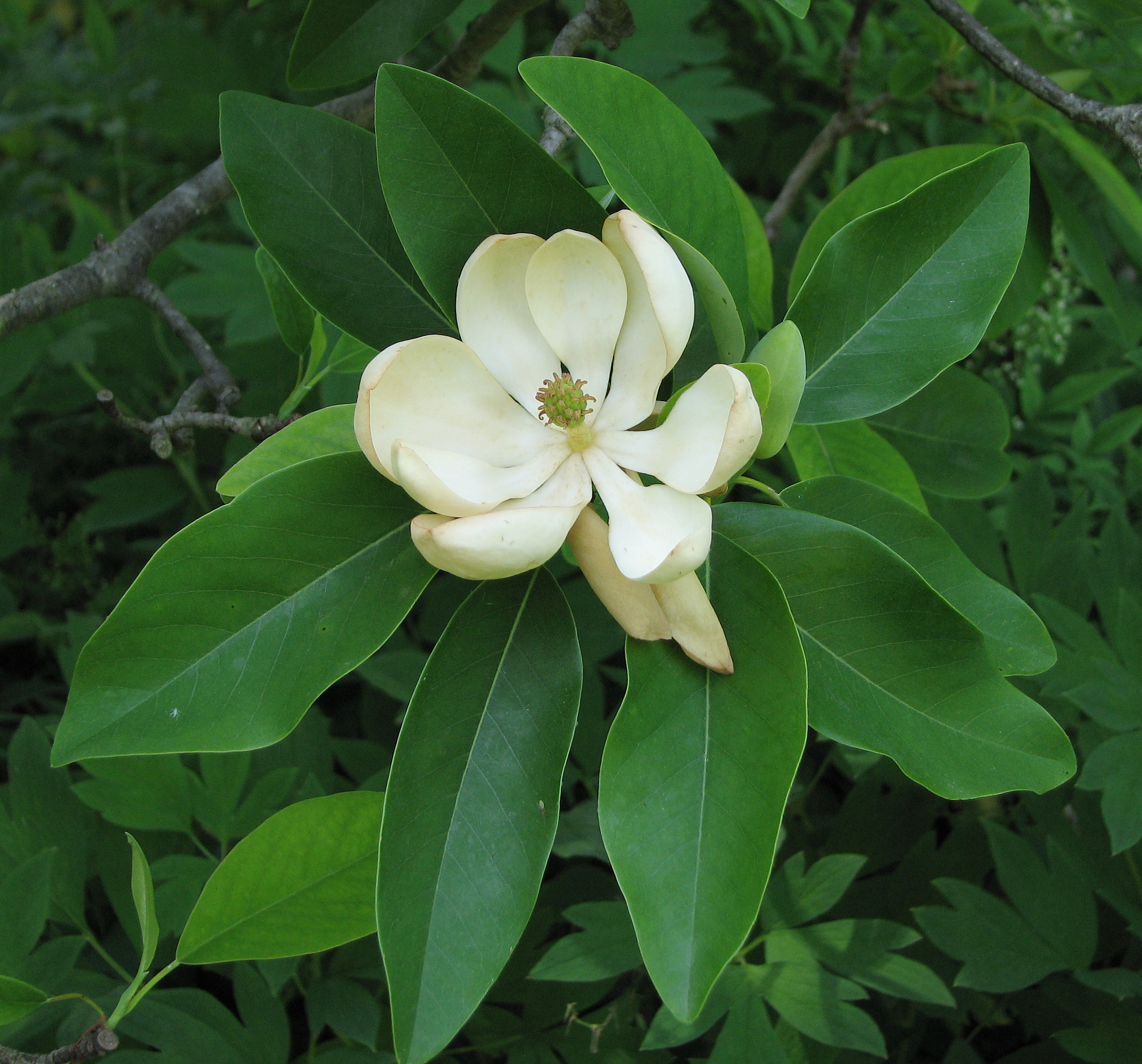
- Close-up view of a Magnolia flower
  Magnolia
  - †Magnolia muldoonae
  - †Magnolia paroblonga
  - †Magnolia tiffneyi
- Mahonia
  - †Mahonia simplex
- †Malus – or unidentified comparable form
- †Mammut
  - †Mammut furlongi – type locality for species
- †Mammuthus
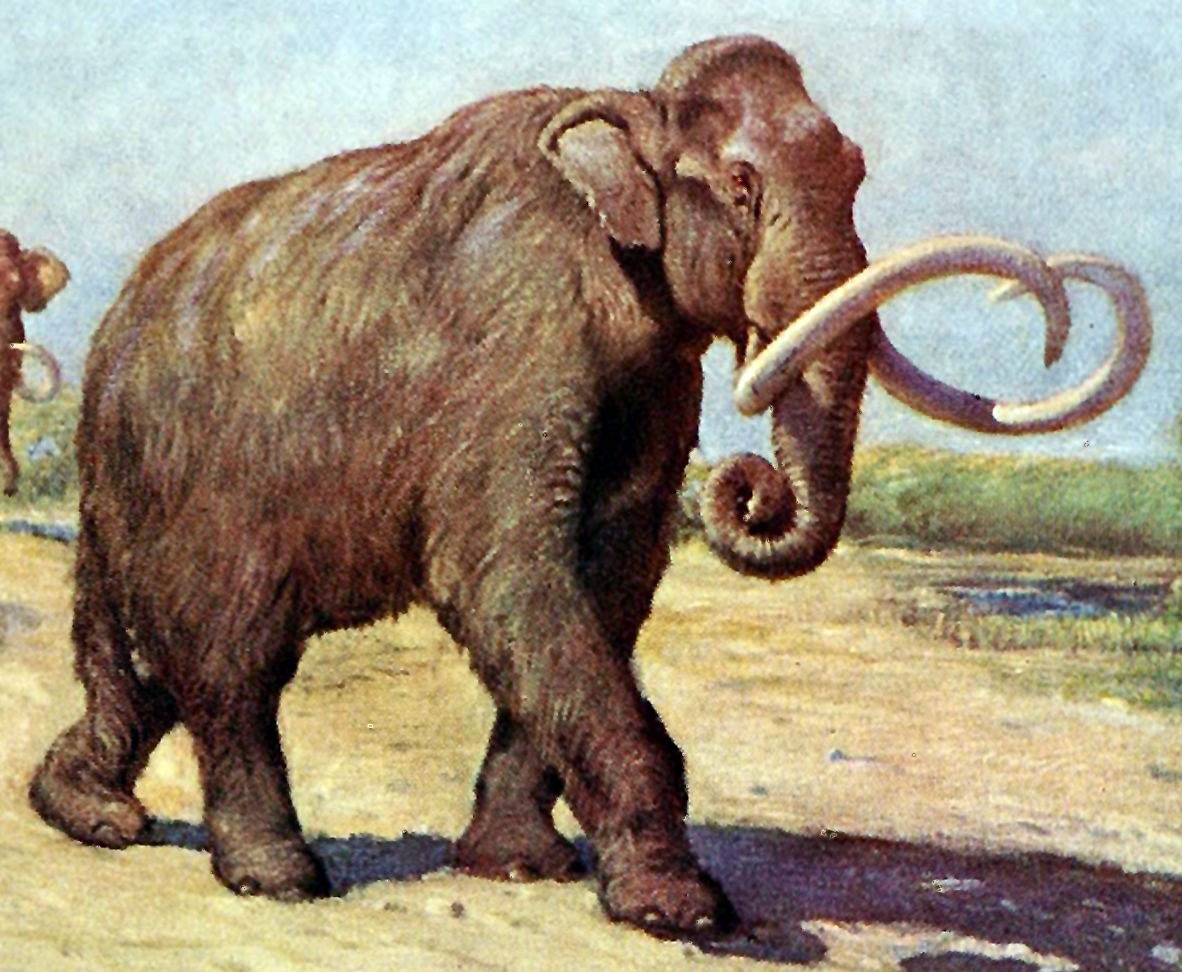
  - Life restoration of a herd of Mammuthus columbi, or Columbian mammoths. The extent of the fur depicted is hypothetical. Charles R. Knight (1909).
    †Mammuthus columbi – tentative report
- Marcia
  - †Marcia bunkeri
  - †Marcia oregonensis
- Margarites
  - †Margarites pupilla
- †Marshochoerus
  - †Marshochoerus socialis
- Martes
  - †Martes gazini – type locality for species
- Martesia
  - †Martesia turnerae
- Mastixia
- †Mastixicarpum
  - †Mastixicarpum occidentale
- †Mastixioidiocarpum
  - †Mastixioidiocarpum oregonense
- Megachasma
  - †Megachasma applegatei
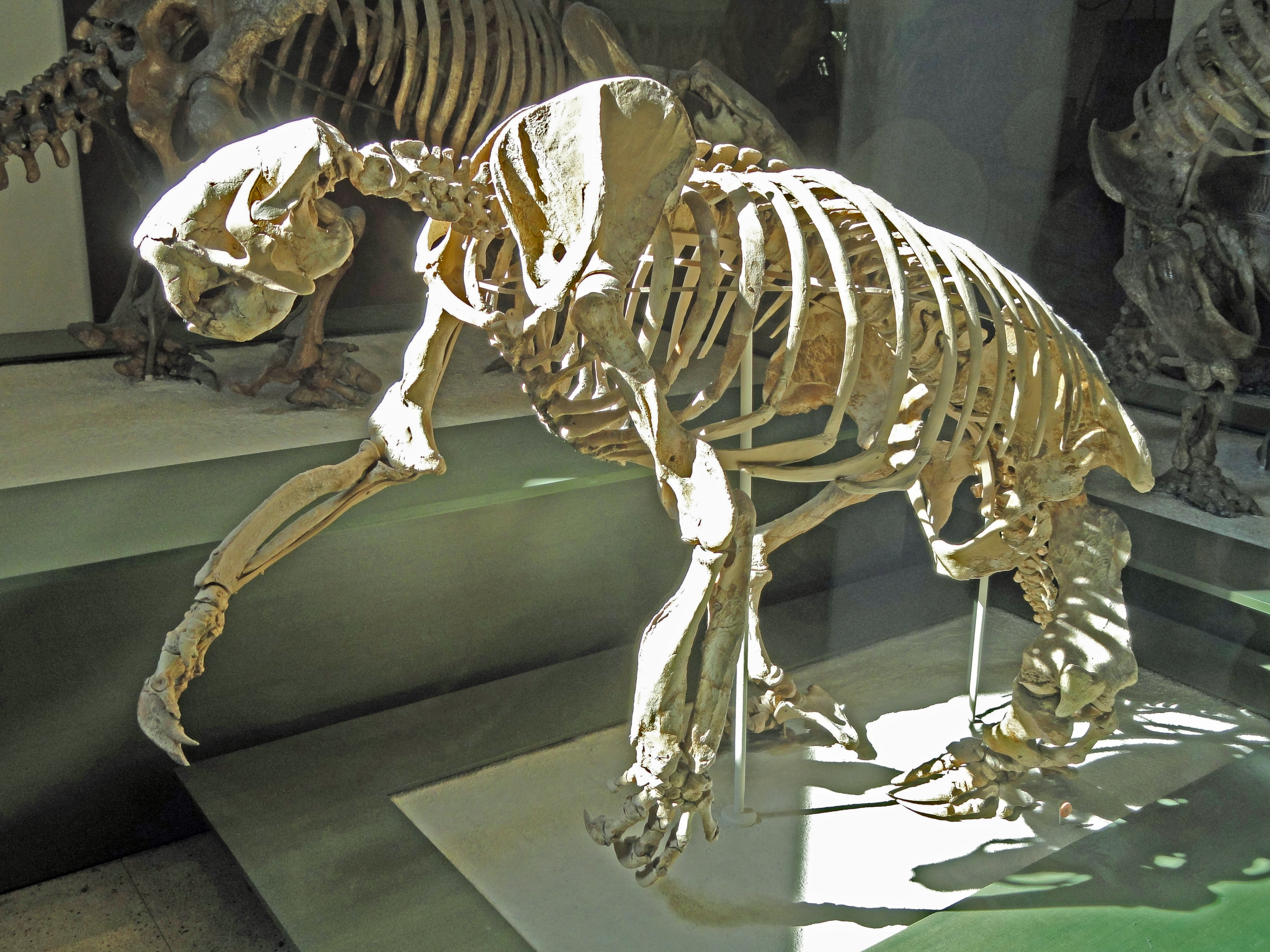
- Mounted fossilized skeleton of the Miocene-Pleistocene ground sloth Megalonyx
  †Megalonyx
- †Megapaloelodus
  - †Megapaloelodus opsigonus – type locality for species
- †Megatylopus
- Megayoldia
  - †Megayoldia chehalisensis
- Melanitta
  - †Melanitta deglandi
  - †Melanitta perspicillata
- †Meliosma
  - †Meliosma beusekomii
  - †Meliosma bonesii
  - †Meliosma elongicarpa
  - †Meliosma jenkinsii
  - †Meliosma leptocarpa
- †Meniscomys
  - †Meniscomys uhtoffi
- †Menispermum – or unidentified comparable form
- Mergus
  - †Mergus merganser
  - †Mergus serrator
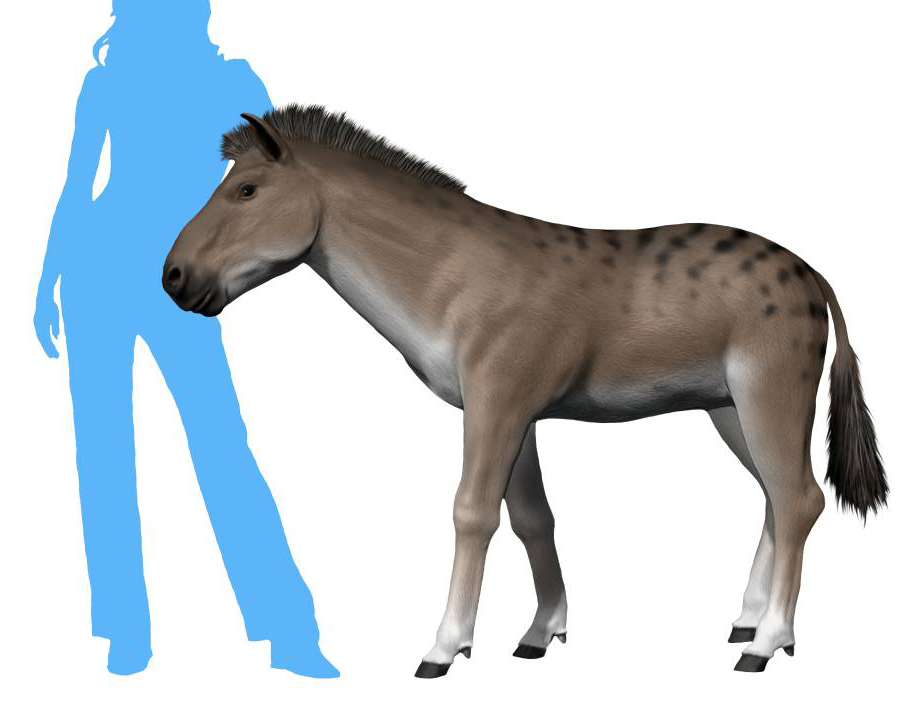
- Life restoration of the Miocene three-toed horse Merychippus
  †Merychippus
  - †Merychippus brevidontus
  - †Merychippus relictus
- †Merychyus
  - †Merychyus arenarum
  - †Merychyus minimus
- †Merycochoerus
  - †Merycochoerus magnus
  - †Merycochoerus matthewi
  - †Merycochoerus minor
- †Merycoides
  - †Merycoides longiceps
- †Merycoidodon
  - †Merycoidodon bullatus
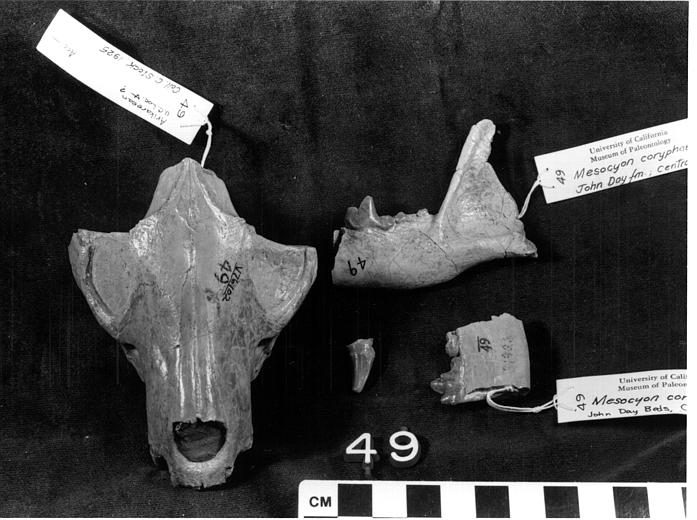
- Skull fossils of the Oligocene-Miocene dog Mesocyon
  †Mesocyon
  - †Mesocyon brachyops
  - †Mesocyon coryphaeus
- †Mesohippus
  - †Mesohippus bairdi – or unidentified comparable form
- †Metalopex
  - †Metalopex merriami
- Metasequoia
  - †Metasequoia occidentalis
- †Microphallus
  - †Microphallus perplexus
- Micropodium
  - †Micropodium ovatum
- †Micropternodus
  - †Micropternodus morgani
- Microtus
  - †Microtus montanus
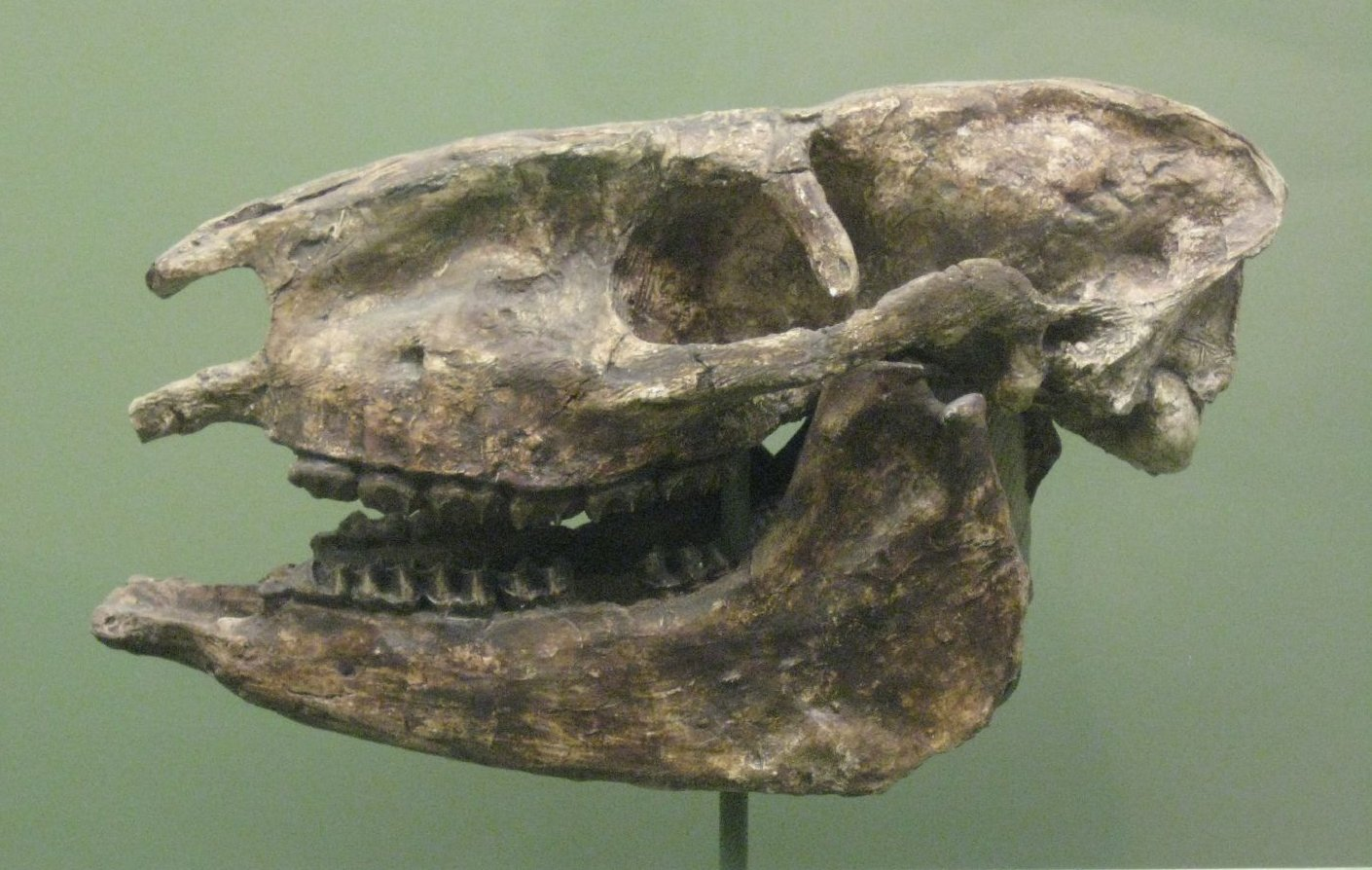
- Fossilized skull of the Eocene-Oligocene three-toed horse Miohippus
  †Miohippus
  - †Miohippus intermedius
- †Miopleionia
  - †Miopleionia oregonensis
- †Mioplejonia
  - †Mioplejonia oregonensis
- †Miotapirus
- †Mistia – type locality for genus
  - †Mistia spinosa – type locality for species
- Modiolatus
  - †Modiolatus rectus
- Modiolus
  - †Modiolus eugenensis
  - †Modiolus modiolus
- †Molopophorus
  - †Molopophorus anglonana
  - †Molopophorus dalli
  - †Molopophorus fishii
  - †Molopophorus gabbi
  - †Molopophorus matthewi
- Molothrus
  - †Molothrus ater – tentative report
- †Monosaulax
  - †Monosaulax progressus – type locality for species
  - †Monosaulax typicus – type locality for species
- †Moropus
  - †Moropus oregonensis
- Mulinia
  - †Mulinia eugenensis
- Mustela
- †Mya
  - †Mya grewingki
  - †Mya truncata
- †Mylagaulodon
  - †Mylagaulodon angulatus
- Myotis – or unidentified comparable form
- †Mystipterus
  - †Mystipterus pacificus
- †Mystocheilus – type locality for genus
  - †Mystocheilus fresti – type locality for species
- Mytilus
  - †Mytilus californianus
  - †Mytilus edulis
  - †Mytilus middendorffi
  - †Mytilus snohomishensis

== N ==
- †Nanotragulus – or unidentified comparable form
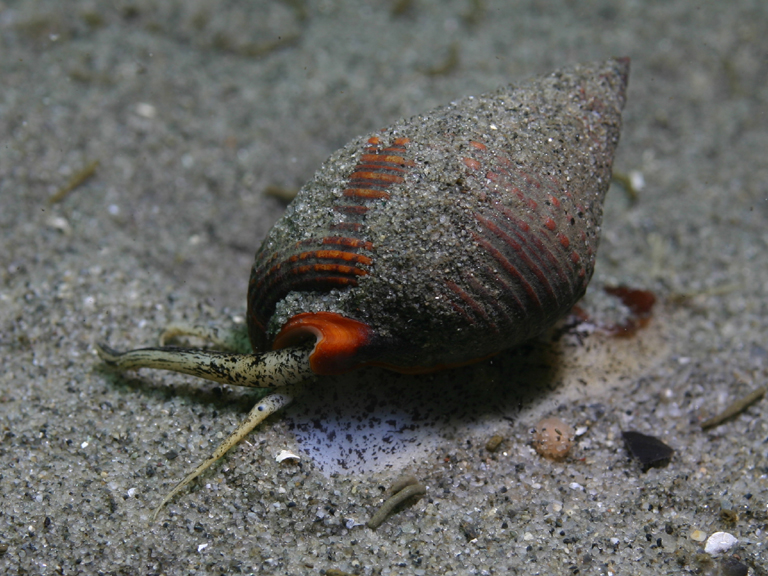
- A living Nassarius, or nassa mud snail
  Nassarius
  - †Nassarius arnoldi
  - †Nassarius fossata
  - †Nassarius lincolnensis
  - †Nassarius perpinguis
- Natica
  - †Natica thomsonae
  - †Natica weaveri
- †Nautilus
  - †Nautilus angustatus – type locality for species
- Nectandra
  - †Nectandra presannguinea
- †Nehalemia – type locality for genus
  - †Nehalemia delicata – type locality for species
- Nemocardium
  - †Nemocardium formosum
  - †Nemocardium griphus – or unidentified comparable form
  - †Nemocardium linteum
- †Neohipparion
  - †Neohipparion leptode – or unidentified comparable form
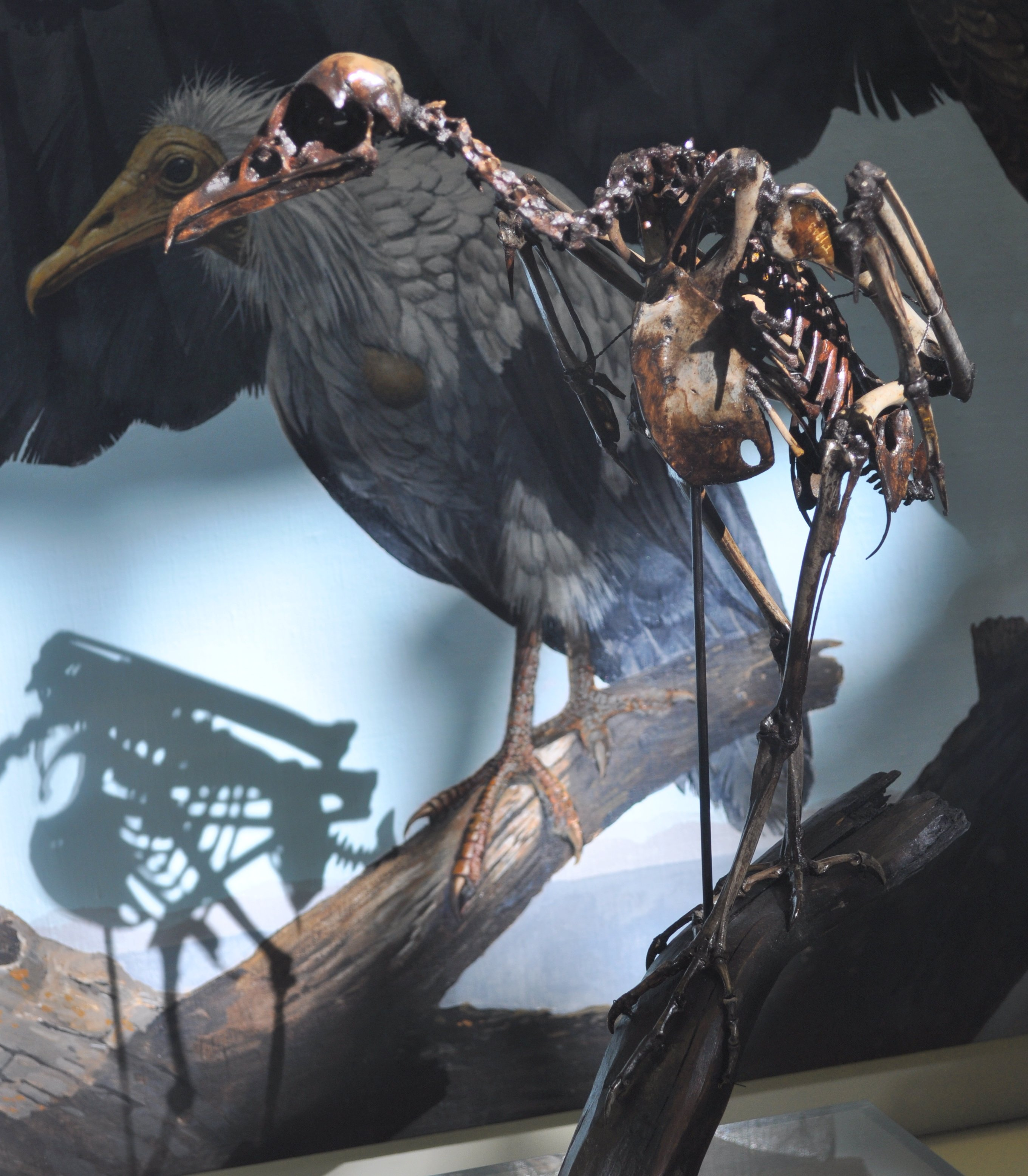
- Mounted fossilized skeleton of the Miocene Neophrontops
  Neophrontops
  - †Neophrontops dakotensis
- Neotamias
  - †Neotamias malloryi
- †Nephrosemen
  - †Nephrosemen reticulatus
- Nettion
  - †Nettion bunkeri
- †Neurotrichus – tentative report
  - †Neurotrichus columbianus
- Neverita
  - †Neverita globosa
  - †Neverita jamesae
  - †Neverita thomsonae
  - †Neverita washingtonensis
- †Nexuotapirus
  - †Nexuotapirus robustus
- Nucella
  - †Nucella decemcostata
  - †Nucella lamellosa
  - †Nucella saxicola
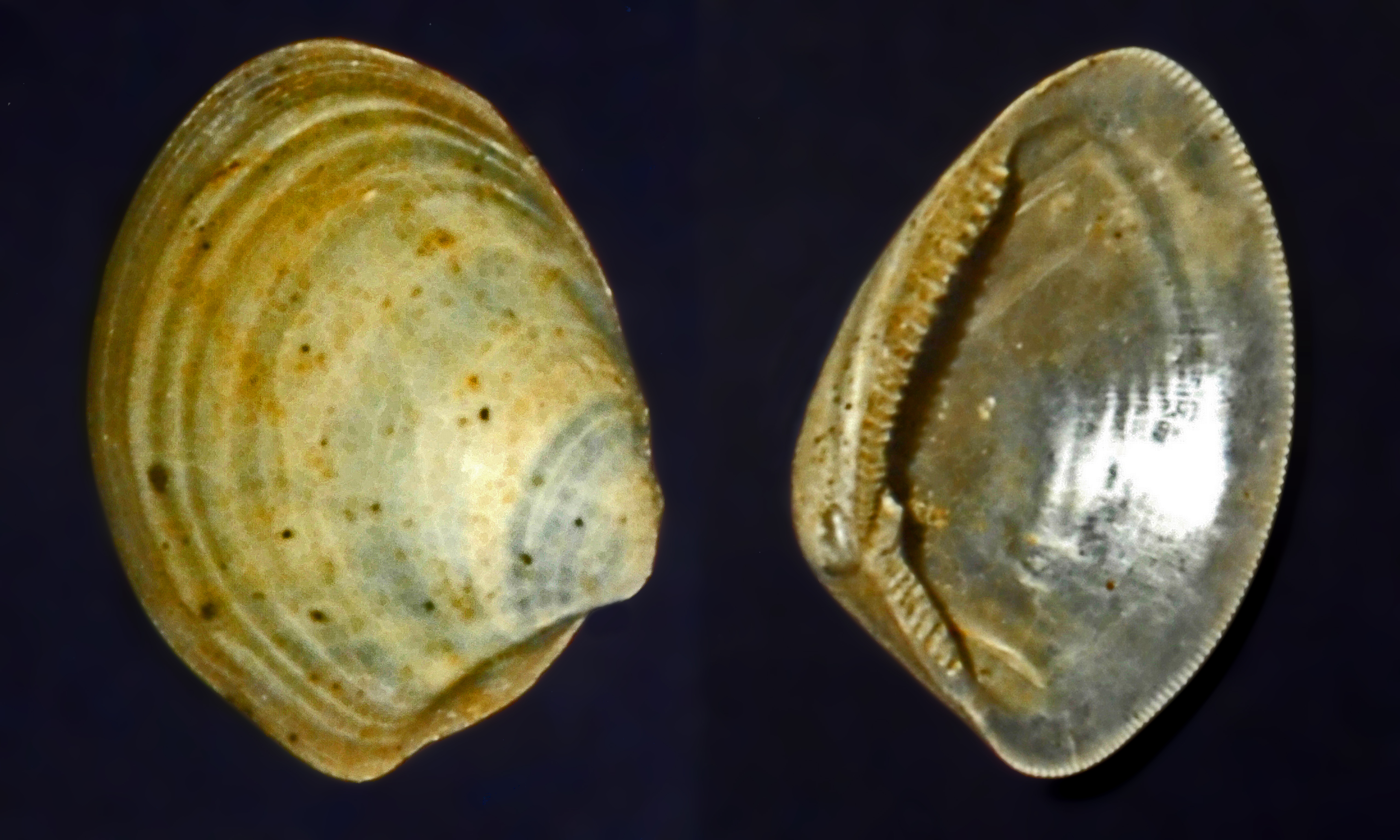
- Interior of a fossilized shell of the Early Ordovician-modern marine bivalve Nucula
  Nucula
  - †Nucula vokesi
- Nuculana
  - †Nuculana gabbi
  - †Nuculana nuculana
- Numenius
  - †Numenius americanus – tentative report
- †Nuphar
- Nutricola
  - †Nutricola lordi
  - †Nutricola tantilla
- Nyroca
  - †Nyroca affinis
  - †Nyroca americana
  - †Nyroca collaris – tentative report
- †Nyssa
  - †Nyssa scottii
  - †Nyssa spatulata

== O ==
- †Ocajila
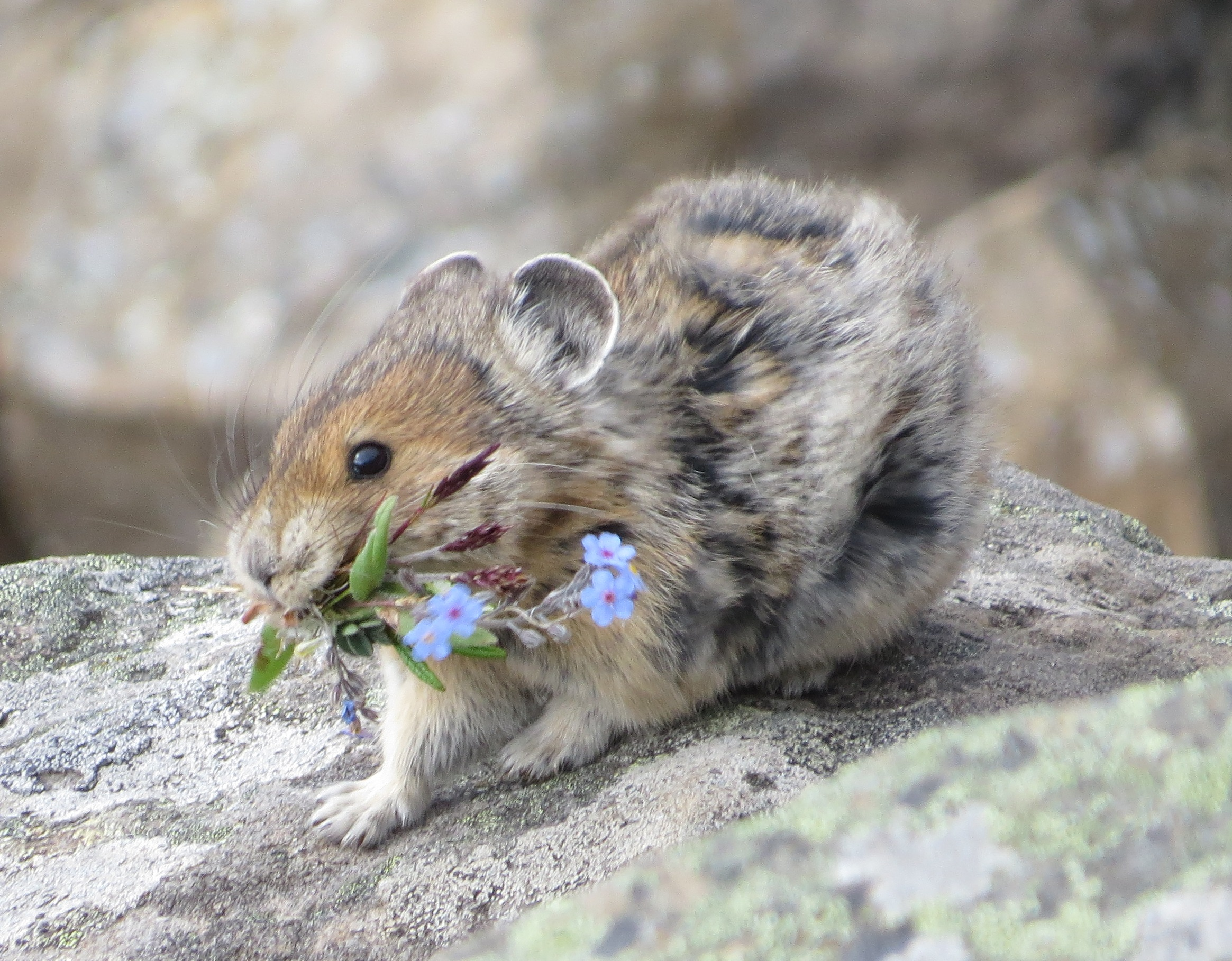
- A living Ochotona, or pika
  Ochotona
  - †Ochotona spanglei – type locality for species
- Ocotea
  - †Ocotea ovoidea
- †Ocyplonessa
  - †Ocyplonessa shotwelli – type locality for species
- †Odontocaryoidea
  - †Odontocaryoidea nodulosa
- †Ogmophis – type locality for genus
  - †Ogmophis oregonensis – type locality for species
- Olar
  - †Olar buccinator
- †Olequahia
  - †Olequahia schencki
- †Oligobunis
- Olivella
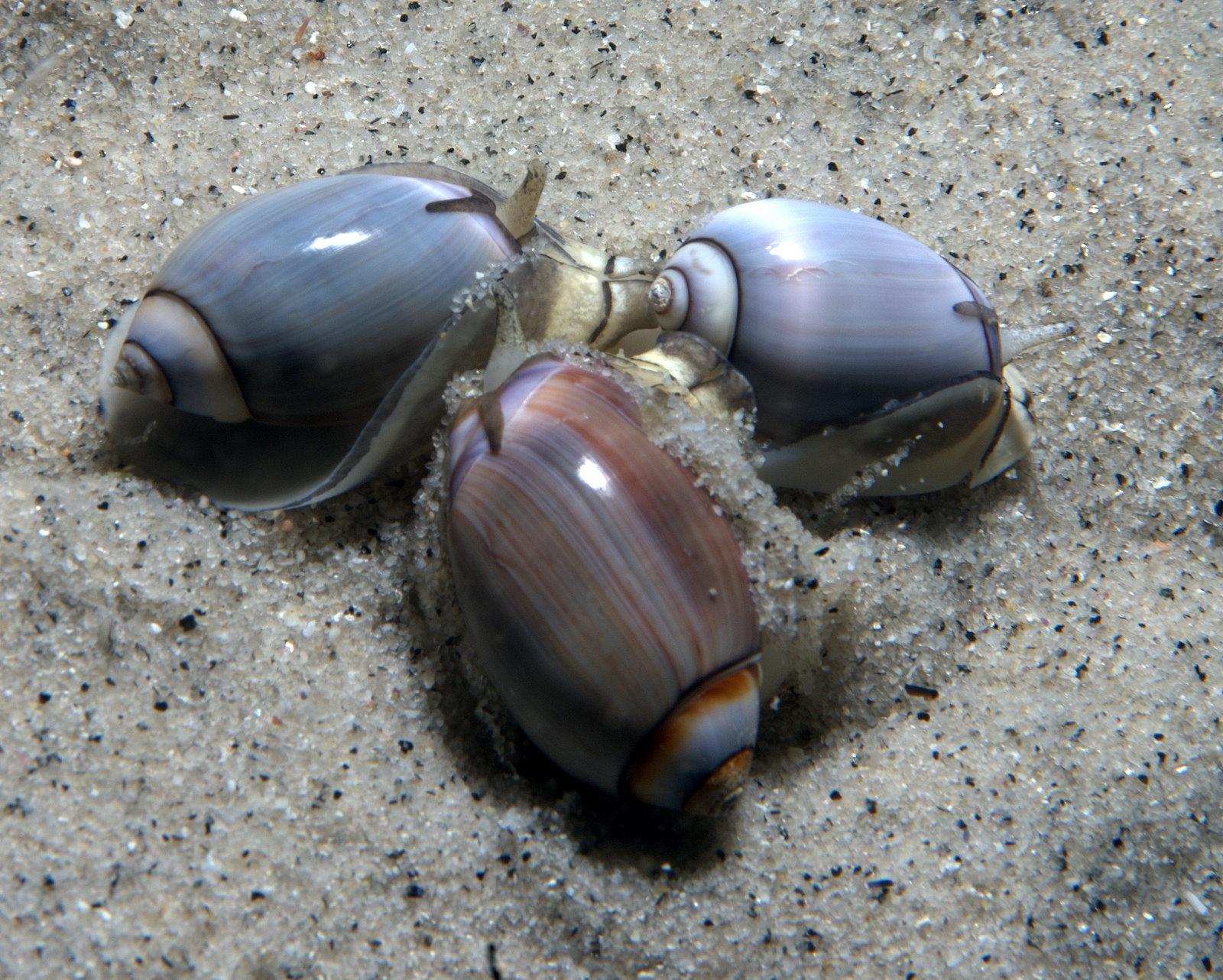
  - Three living Olivella biplicata, or purple dwarf olive sea snail
    †Olivella biplicata
  - †Olivella mathewsonii
  - †Olivella pedroana
- †Omsicarpium
  - †Omsicarpium striatum
- Ondatra
  - †Ondatra annectens – type locality for species
- Opalia
  - †Opalia hertleini
  - †Opalia williamsoni – or unidentified comparable form
- †Oregonomys
  - †Oregonomys pebblespringsensis – type locality for species
  - †Oregonomys sargenti
- †Oreodontoides
  - †Oreodontoides oregonensis
- †Oreolagus
  - †Oreolagus wallacei – type locality for species
- †Oryctoantiquus – type locality for genus
  - †Oryctoantiquus borealis – type locality for species
- †Osbornodon
  - †Osbornodon sesnoni
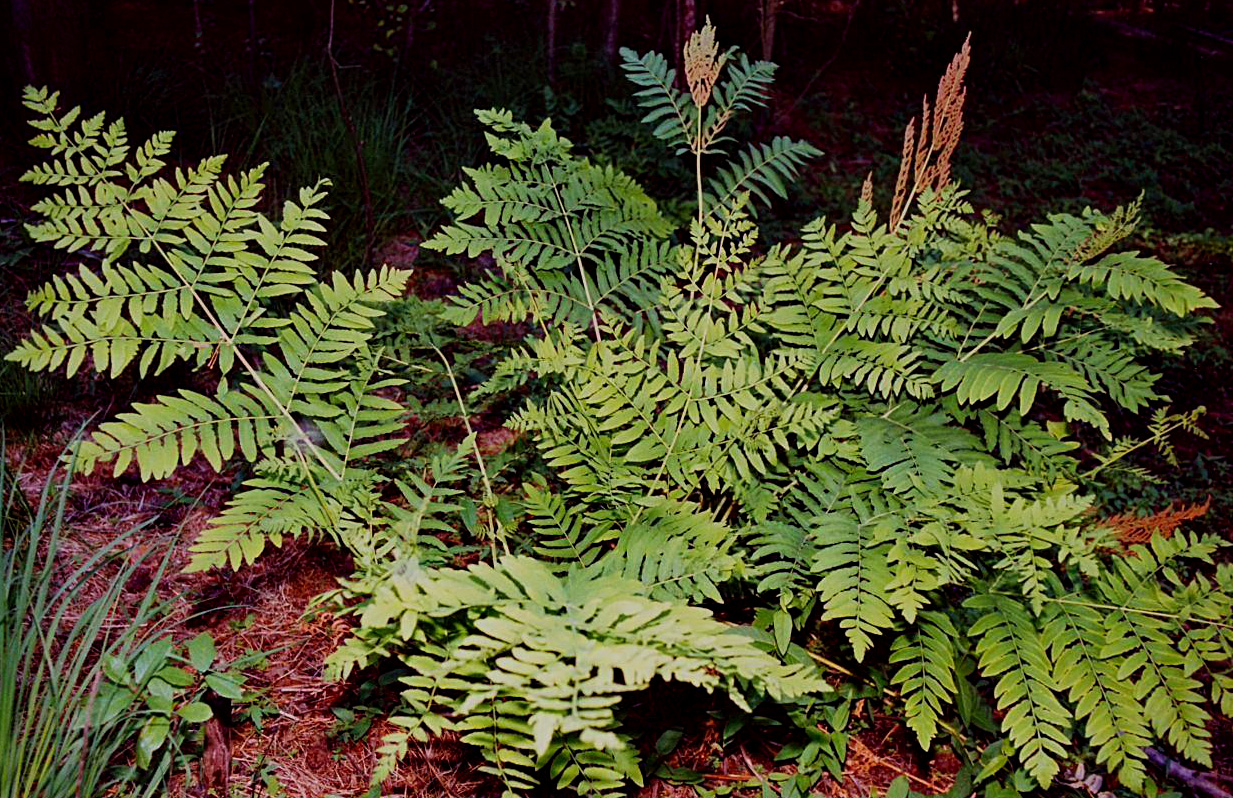
- Living Osmunda ferns
  †Osmunda
  - †Osmunda occidentale
- Ostrea
  - †Ostrea lurida – or unidentified comparable form
- Ostrya
  - †Ostrya oregoniana

== P ==
- †Pachycrommium
  - †Pachycrommium clarki
- †Paciculus
- †Pacificotaria – type locality for genus
  - †Pacificotaria hadromma – type locality for species
- †Palaeoallophylus
  - †Palaeoallophylus globosa
  - †Palaeoallophylus gordonii
- †Palaeocarya
  - †Palaeocarya clarnensis
  - †Palaeocarya olsonii – or unidentified comparable form
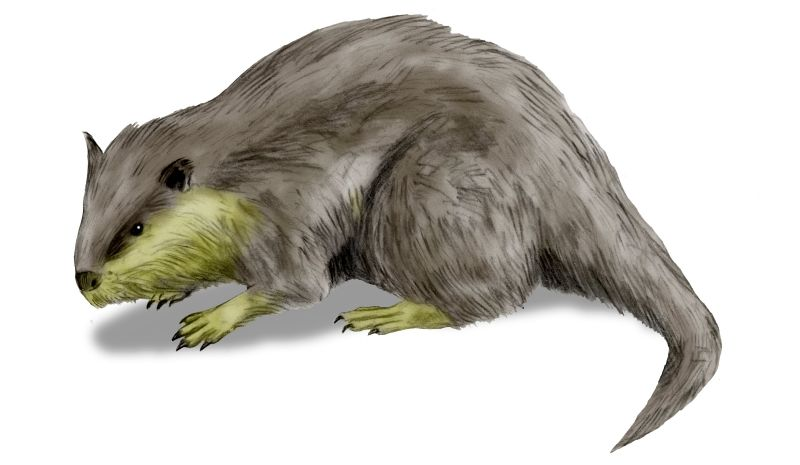
- Life restoration of the Oligocene-Miocene beaver Palaeocastor
  †Palaeocastor
  - †Palaeocastor peninsulatus
- †Palaeolagus
  - †Palaeolagus haydeni
- †Palaeophytocrene
  - †Palaeophytocrene hancockii
  - †Palaeophytocrene pseudopersica
- †Palaeosinomenium
  - †Palaeosinomenium venablesii
- †Paleopanax
  - †Paleopanax oregonensis
- †Paleoplatycarya – tentative report
  - †Paleoplatycarya hickeyi
- †Paleotetrix
  - †Paleotetrix gilli
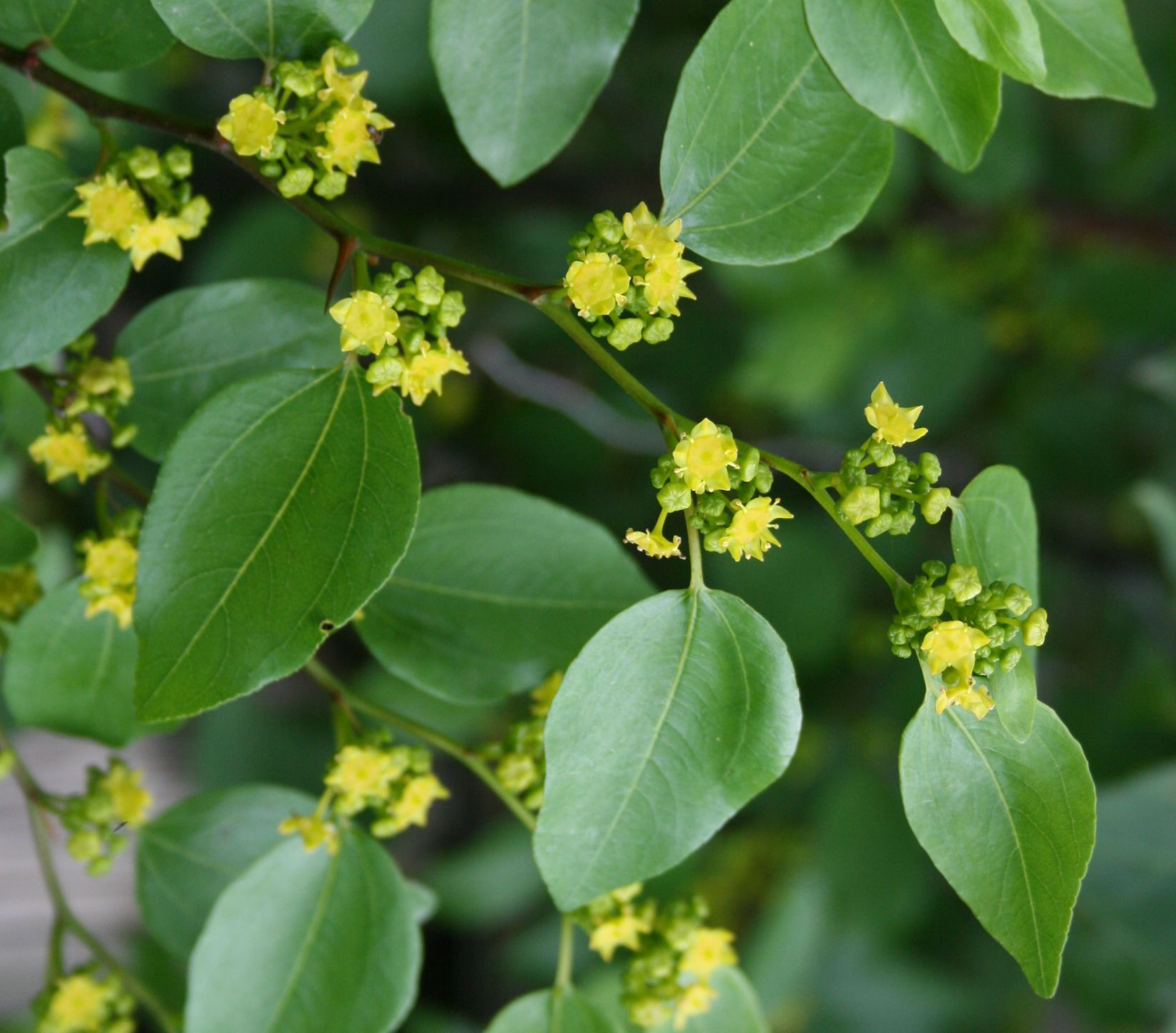
- Flowers and foliage of a living Paliurus
  Paliurus
  - †Paliurus blakei
- Pandora
  - †Pandora eocapsella
  - †Pandora grandis
  - †Pandora laevis
- Panomya
  - †Panomya ampla
- Panopea
  - †Panopea abrupta
  - †Panopea ramonensis
  - †Panopea snohomishensis
- Panthera
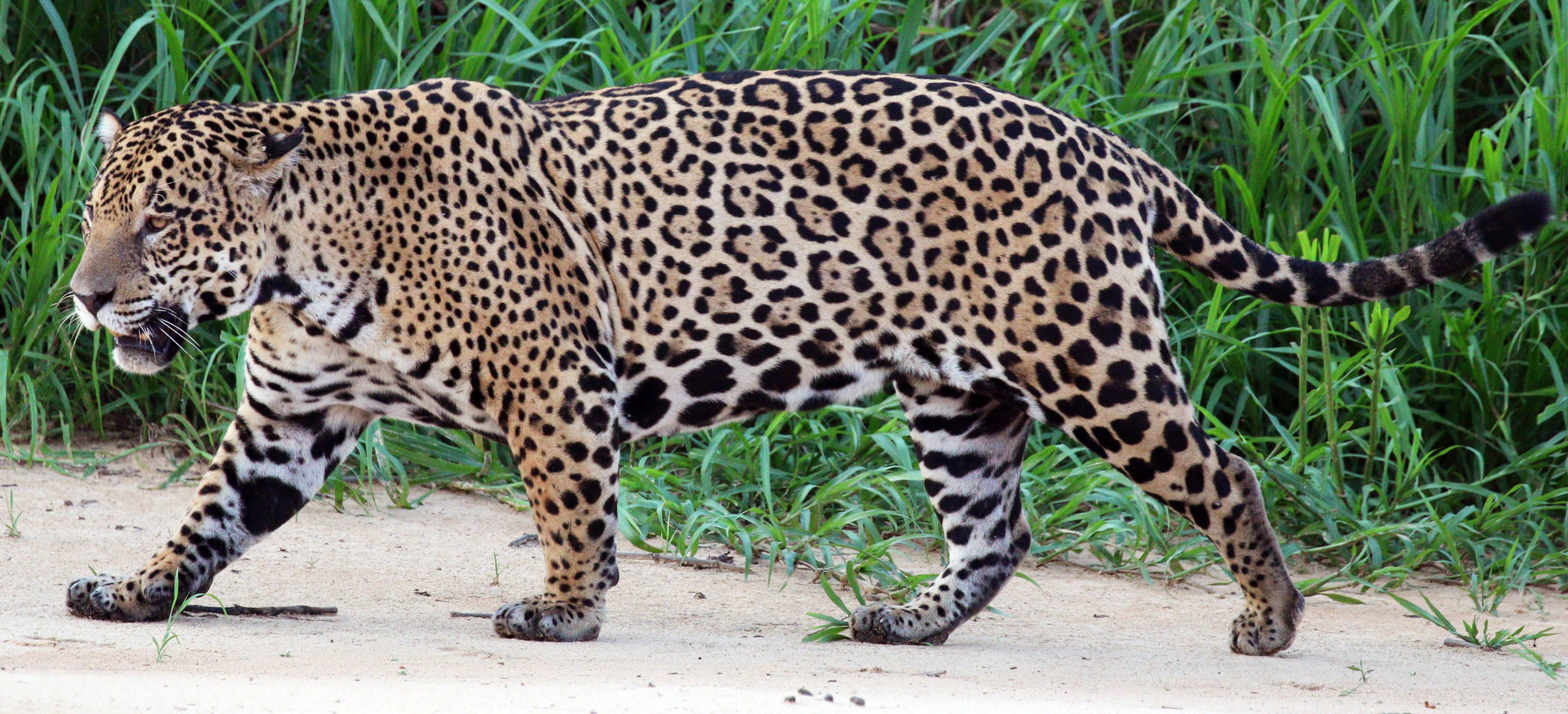
  - A living Panthera onca, or jaguar
    †Panthera onca – or unidentified comparable form
- †Parablastomeryx
- †Paracarpinus
  - †Paracarpinus chaneyi
- †Paracosoryx
  - †Paracosoryx nevadensis – or unidentified comparable form
- †Paracryptotis
  - †Paracryptotis rex
- †Paradaphoenus
  - †Paradaphoenus cuspigerus
- †Paradomnina
  - †Paradomnina relictus – type locality for species
- †Paraenhydrocyon
  - †Paraenhydrocyon josephi
  - †Paraenhydrocyon wallovianus
- †Parahippus
  - †Parahippus leonensis – or unidentified related form
  - †Parahippus pawniensis
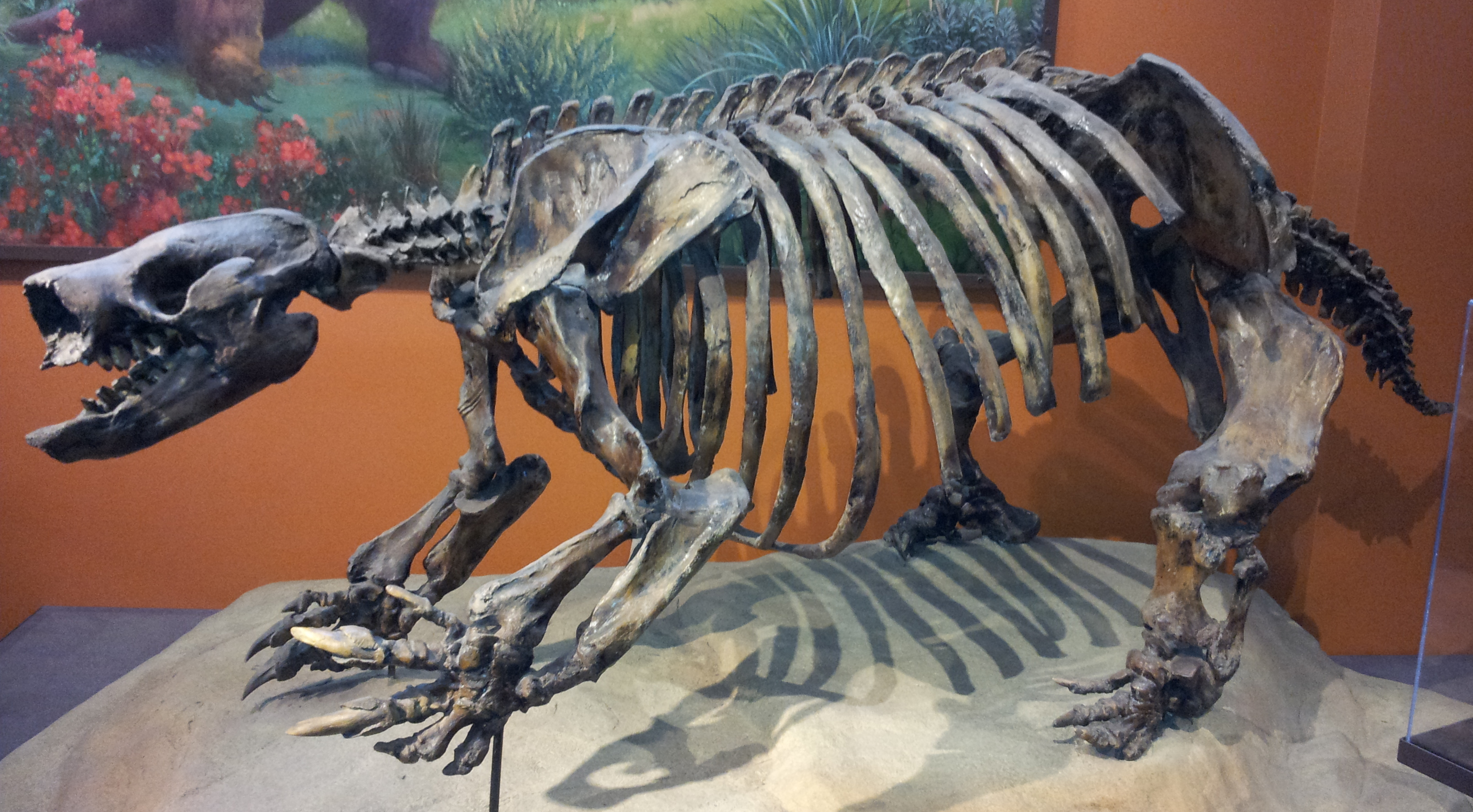
- Fossilized skeleton of the Pliocene-Pleistocene ground sloth Paramylodon
  †Paramylodon
  - †Paramylodon harlani
- †Parapaenemarmota
  - †Parapaenemarmota oregonensis
- Parapholas
  - †Parapholas californica
- †Parapliosaccomys
  - †Parapliosaccomys oregonensis
- †Parasyrinx
  - †Parasyrinx delicata
- †Paratomarctus
  - †Paratomarctus temerarius
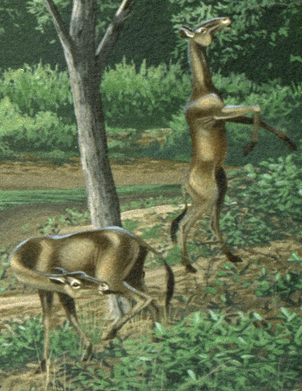
- Life restoration the Eocene-Oligocene camel Paratylopus (upper right)
  †Paratylopus
- †Paronychomys
  - †Paronychomys shotwelli – type locality for species
- †Paroreodon
  - †Paroreodon parvus
  - †Paroreodon stocki
- †Parrotia
  - †Parrotia brevipetiolata
- †Parthenocissus
  - †Parthenocissus angustisulcata
  - †Parthenocissus clarnensis
- Parvamussium
  - †Parvamussium astoriana
- Parvicardium
  - †Parvicardium eugenense
- Passalus
  - †Passalus indormitus – type locality for species
- †Pasternackia
  - †Pasternackia pusilla
- Patinopecten
  - †Patinopecten caurinus
  - †Patinopecten coosensis
  - †Patinopecten oregonensis
  - †Patinopecten popatulus
  - †Patinopecten propatulus
- †Patriofelis
  - †Patriofelis ferox
- †Pediocetes
  - †Pediocetes lucasii – type locality for species
  - †Pediocetes nanus – type locality for species
  - †Pediocetes phasianellus
- Pekania
  - †Pekania occulta – type locality for species
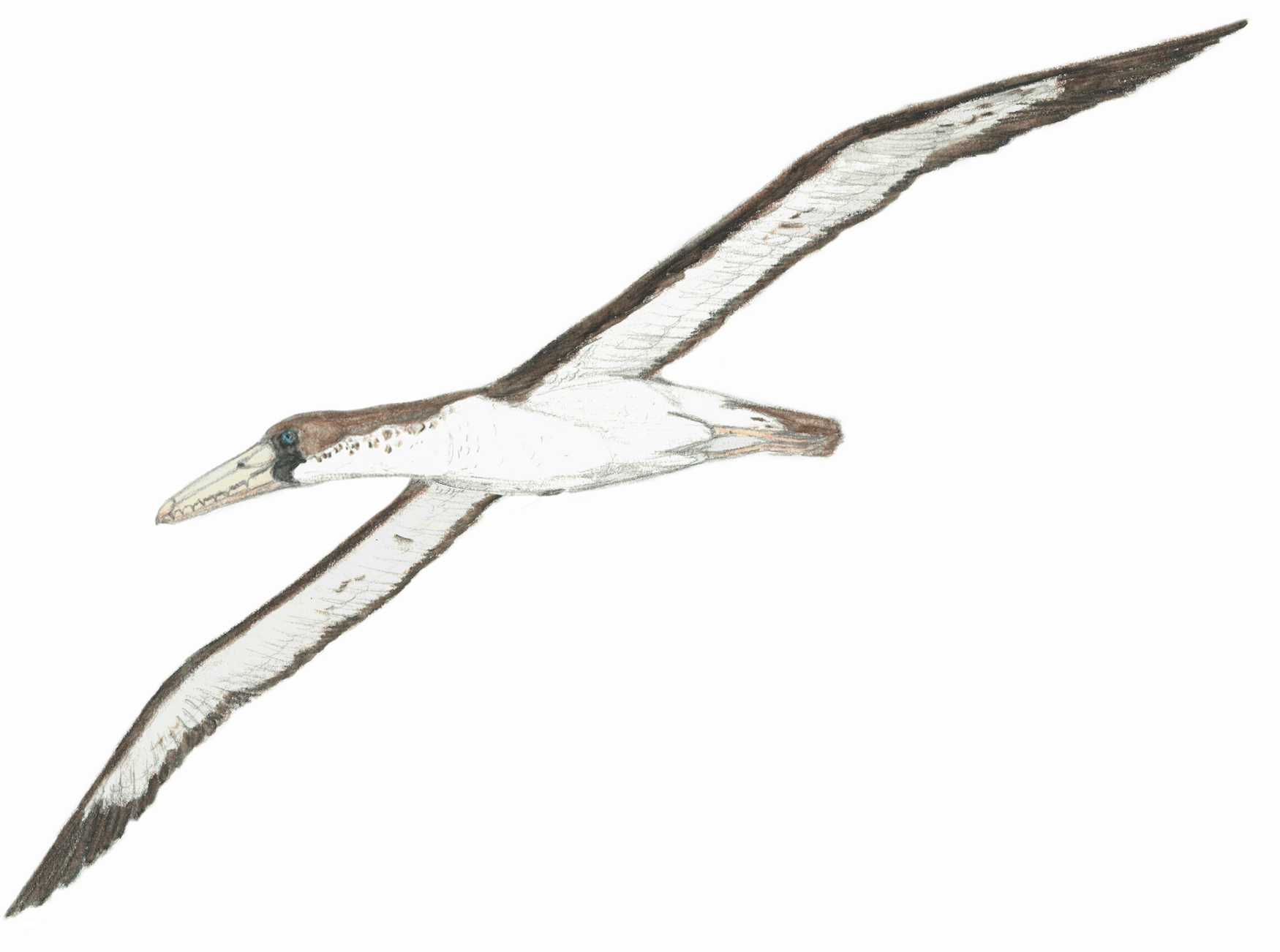
- Life restoration of the Oligocene-Pleistocene false-toothed bird Pelagornis
  †Pelagornis
- Pelecanus
  - †Pelecanus erythrorhynchos
  - †Pelecanus erythrorhynchus – tentative report
- Penitella
  - †Penitella penita
- †Pentoperculum
  - †Pentoperculum minimus
- †Perchoerus
  - †Perchoerus probus
- †Peridiomys
  - †Peridiomys oregonensis
- Periploma
- Perognathus
  - †Perognathus stevei – type locality for species
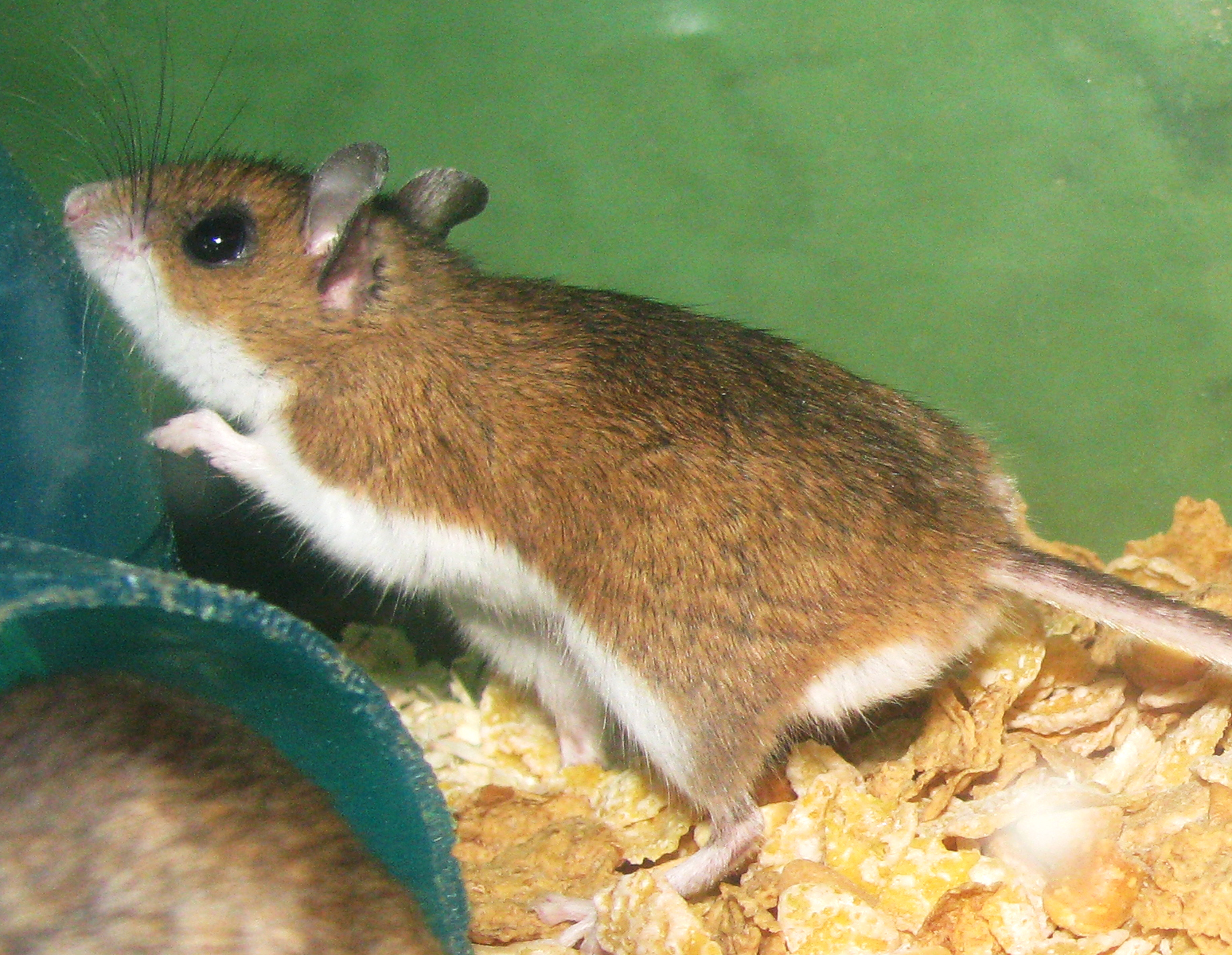
- A living Peromyscus, or deer mouse
  Peromyscus
  - †Peromyscus antiquus
  - †Peromyscus dentalis
- †Perse
  - †Perse lincolnensis
  - †Perse pittsburgensis
- †Petauristodon
- Phalacrocorax
  - †Phalacrocorax auritus – tentative report
  - †Phalacrocorax leptopus – type locality for species
  - †Phalacrocorax macropus
  - †Phalacrocorax marinavis – type locality for species
- Phalaropus
  - †Phalaropus lobatus
- Phalium
  - †Phalium aequisulcatum
  - †Phalium turricula
- Phanerolepida
  - †Phanerolepida oregonensis
- †Philotrox
  - †Philotrox condoni
- †Phlaocyon
  - †Phlaocyon latidens
- Phoca
  - †Phoca vitulina – or unidentified comparable form
- †Phocavis – type locality for genus
  - †Phocavis maritimus – type locality for species
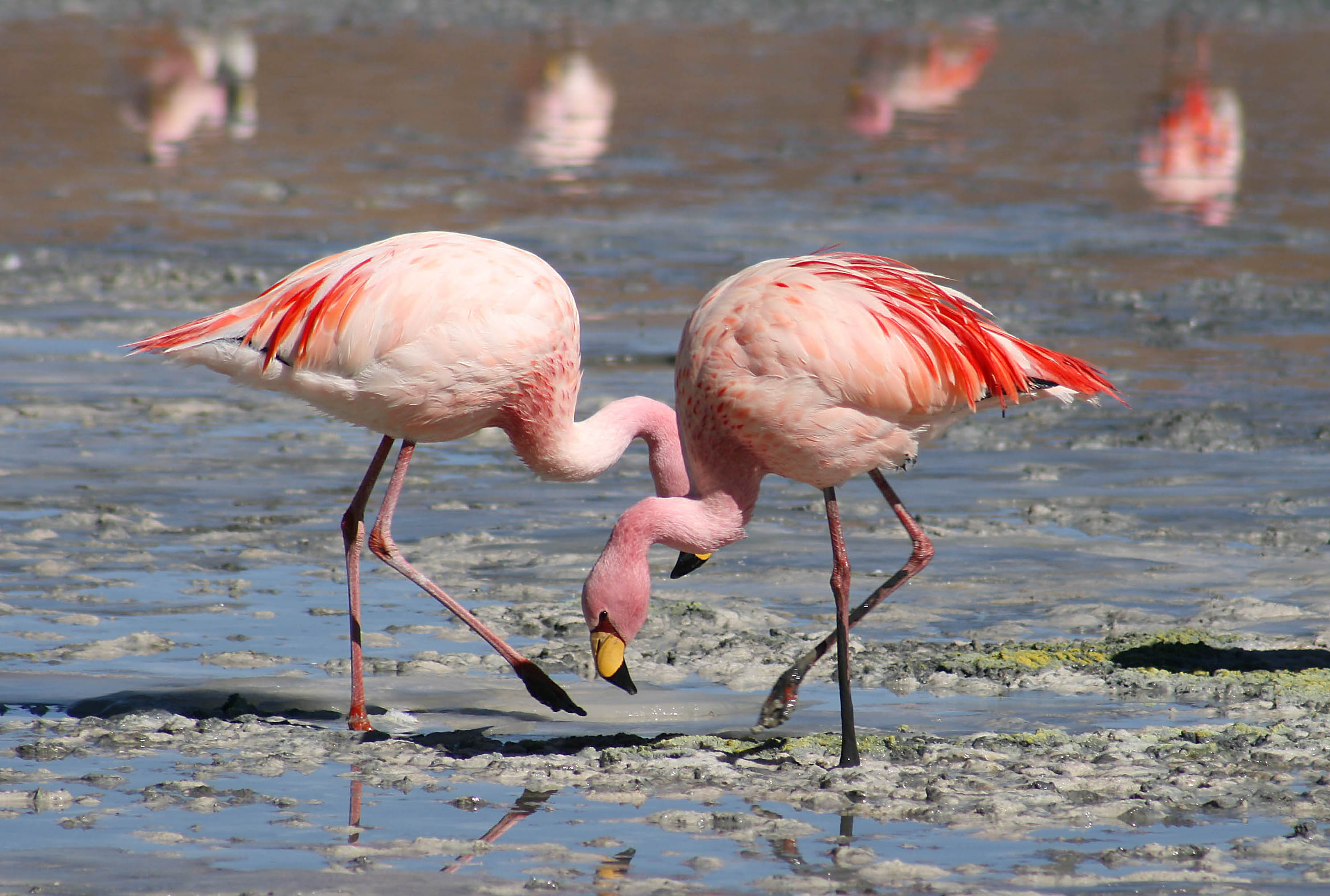
- Two Phoenicopterus, or flamingos
  Phoenicopterus
  - †Phoenicopterus copei – type locality for species
- †Pileosperma
  - †Pileosperma minutum
  - †Pileosperma ovatum
- †Pinckneya
  - †Pinckneya dilcheri
- †Pinis
  - †Pinis johndayensis
- †Pinnarctidion
  - †Pinnarctidion rayi – type locality for species
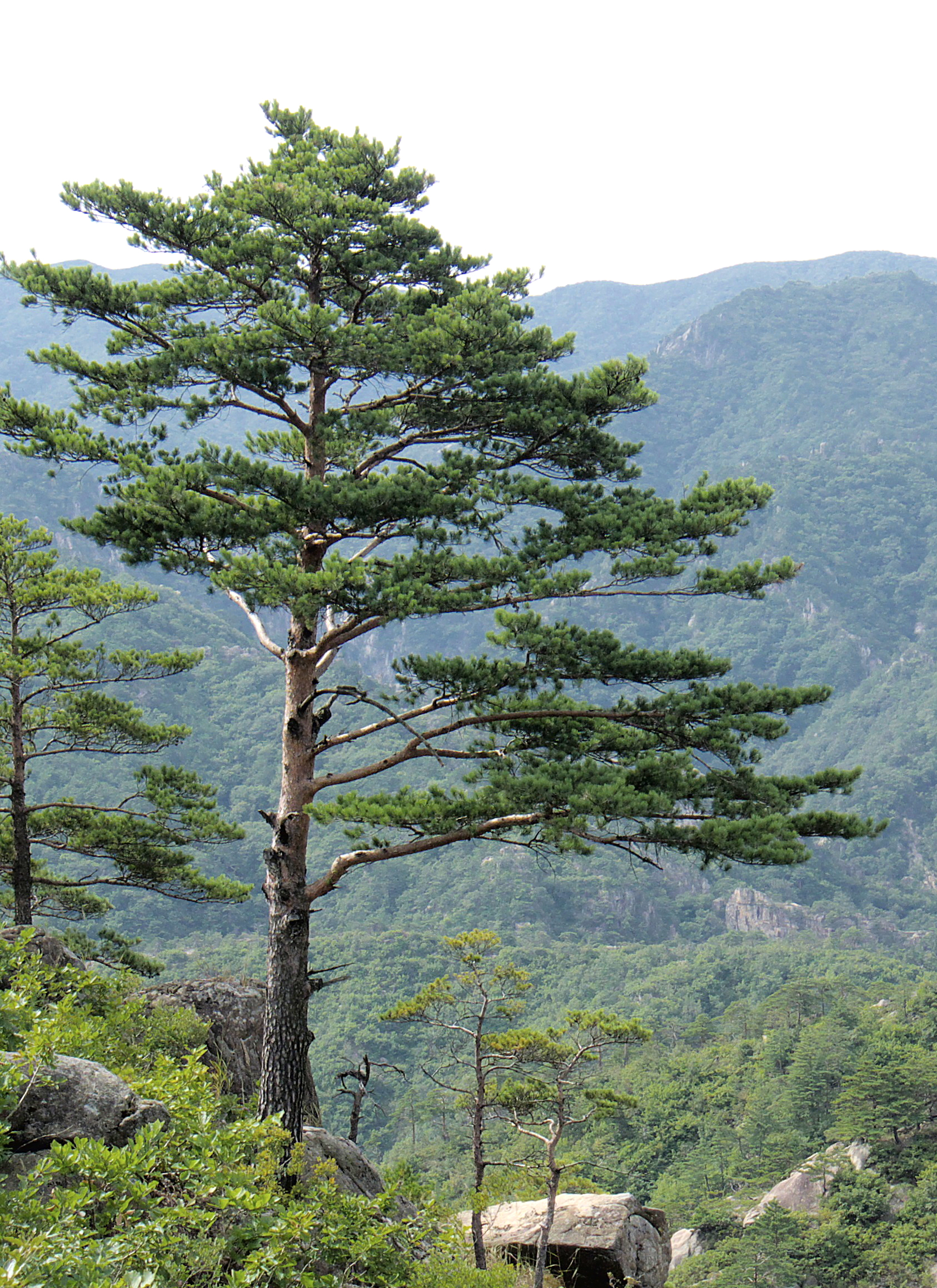
- A living Pinus, or pine tree
  Pinus
  - †Pinus johndayensis
  - †Pinus knowltoni
- †Pistachioides
  - †Pistachioides striata
- Pitar
  - †Pitar clarki
  - †Pitar dalli
- †Plafkeria
  - †Plafkeria obliquifolia
- †Plagiolophus
  - †Plagiolophus weaveri
- Platanus
  - †Platanus condoni
  - †Platanus condonii
  - †Platanus dissecta
  - †Platanus exaspera
  - †Platanus hirticarpa
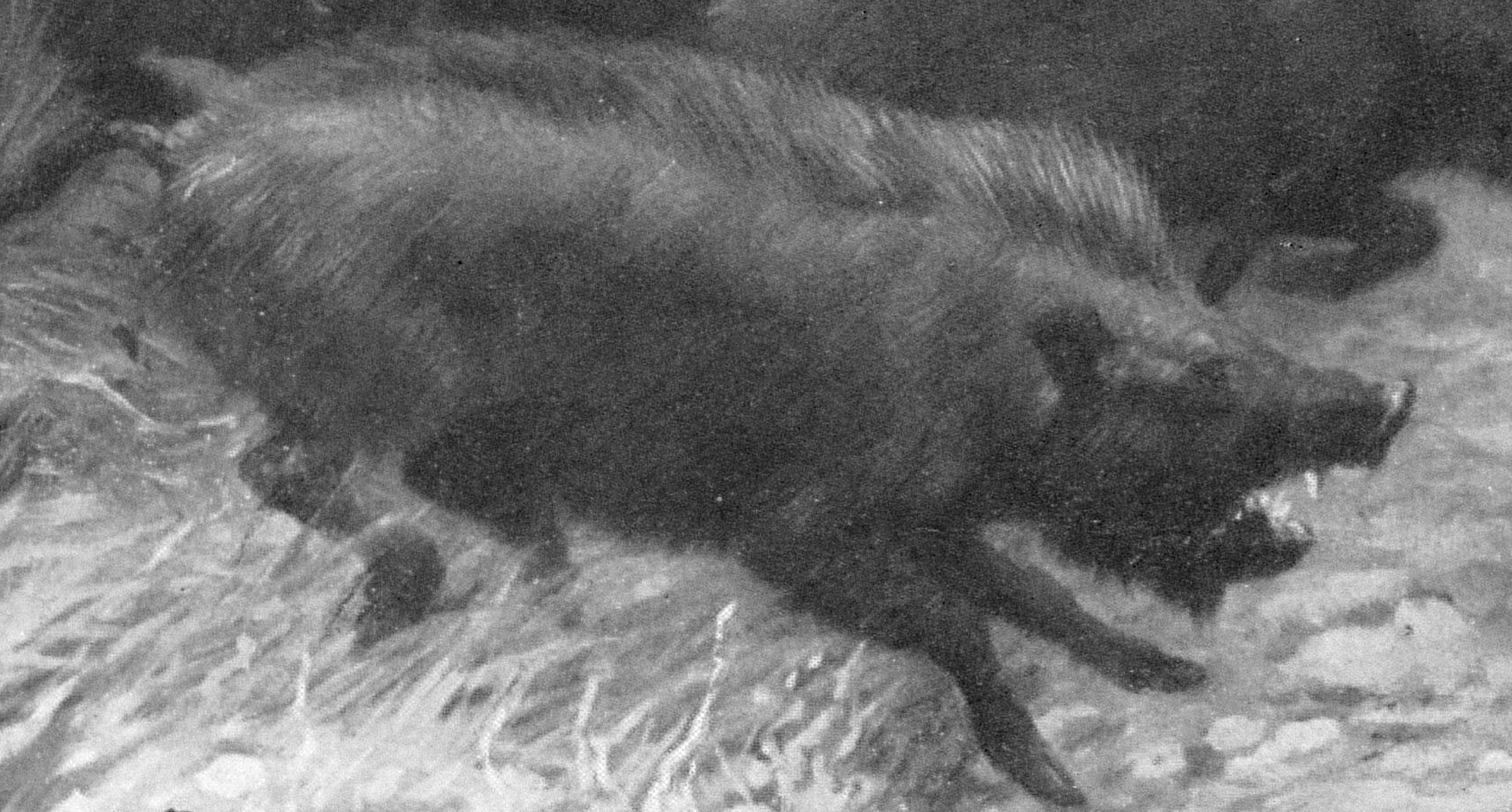
- Restoration of a herd of alarmed Miocene-Pleistocene peccaries of the genus Platygonus. Charles R. Knight (1922).
  †Platygonus
  - †Platygonus brachirostris
  - †Platygonus oregonensis
  - †Platygonus vetus – or unidentified comparable form
- †Pleiolama
  - †Pleiolama vera – or unidentified comparable form
- †Plesiocolopirus
  - †Plesiocolopirus hancocki
- †Plesiogulo
  - †Plesiogulo marshalli
- †Plesiosorex
  - †Plesiosorex donroosai – or unidentified comparable form
- †Pleurolicus
  - †Pleurolicus sulcifrons
- †Pleurolira
  - †Pleurolira oregonensis
- †Pleuroliria
  - †Pleuroliria bicarinata
- †Plioceros
- †Pliocyon – or unidentified comparable form
  - †Pliocyon medius
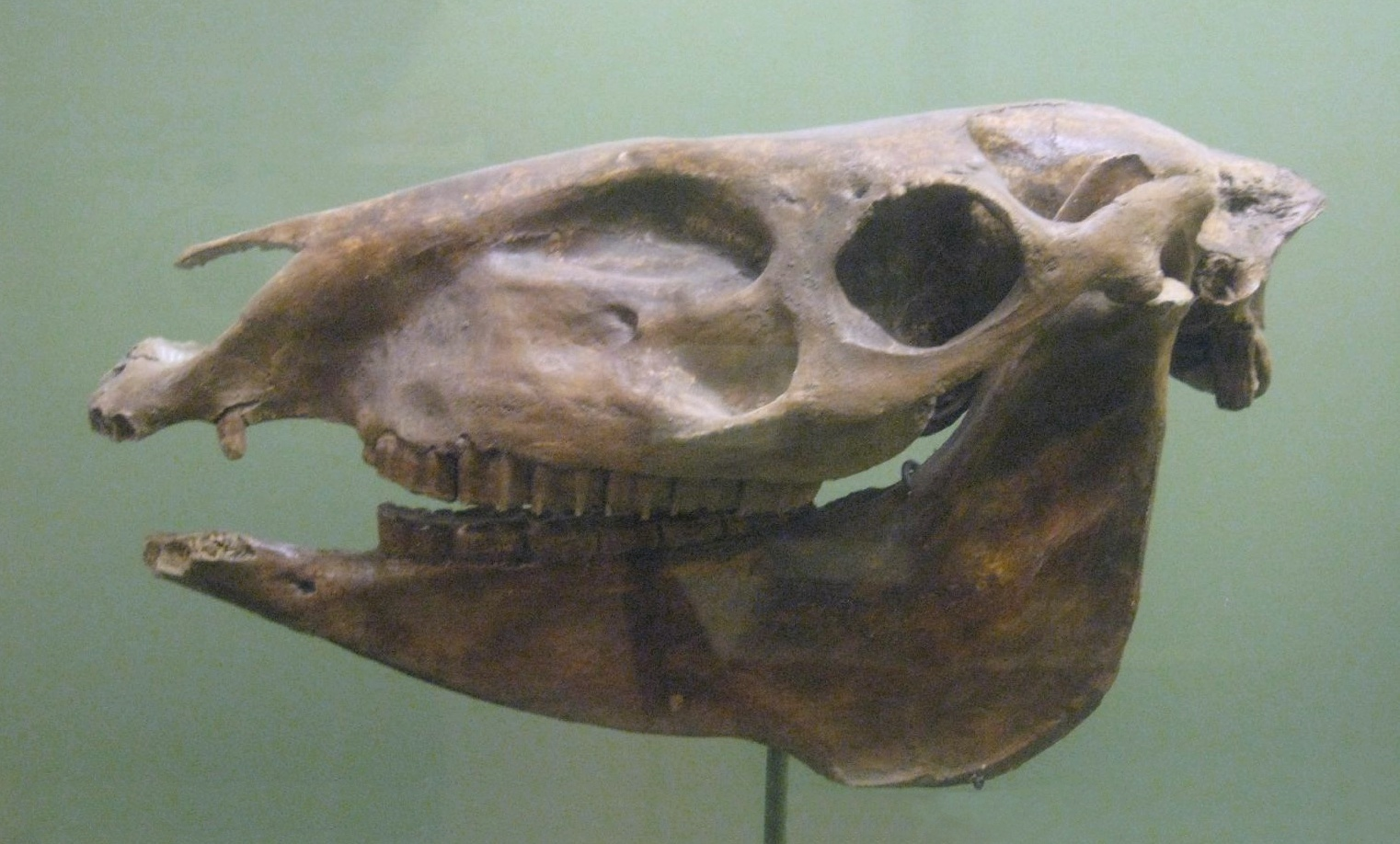
- Fossilized skull of the Miocene horse Pliohippus
  †Pliohippus
  - †Pliohippus spectans
- †Plionarctos
- †Plionictis
  - †Plionictis ogygia
  - †Plionictis oregonensis
- †Pliosaccomys
- †Pliotaxidea
  - †Pliotaxidea nevadensis
- †Pliozapus
  - †Pliozapus solus
- Podiceps
  - †Podiceps auritus – tentative report
- Podilymbus
  - †Podilymbus podiceps
- Pododesmus
  - †Pododesmus macrochisma
- Life restoration of the Oligocene false saber-toothed cat Pogonodon in a tree
  †Pogonodon
  - †Pogonodon brachyops
  - †Pogonodon platycopis – type locality for species
- Polinices
  - †Polinices canalis
  - †Polinices draconis
  - †Polinices galianoi
  - †Polinices washingtonensis
  - †Polinices washingtoni
- †Polinicies
  - †Polinicies clementensis
  - †Polinicies nuciformis
- †Pollostosperma
  - †Pollostosperma dictyum
- †Polygrana
  - †Polygrana nutbedense
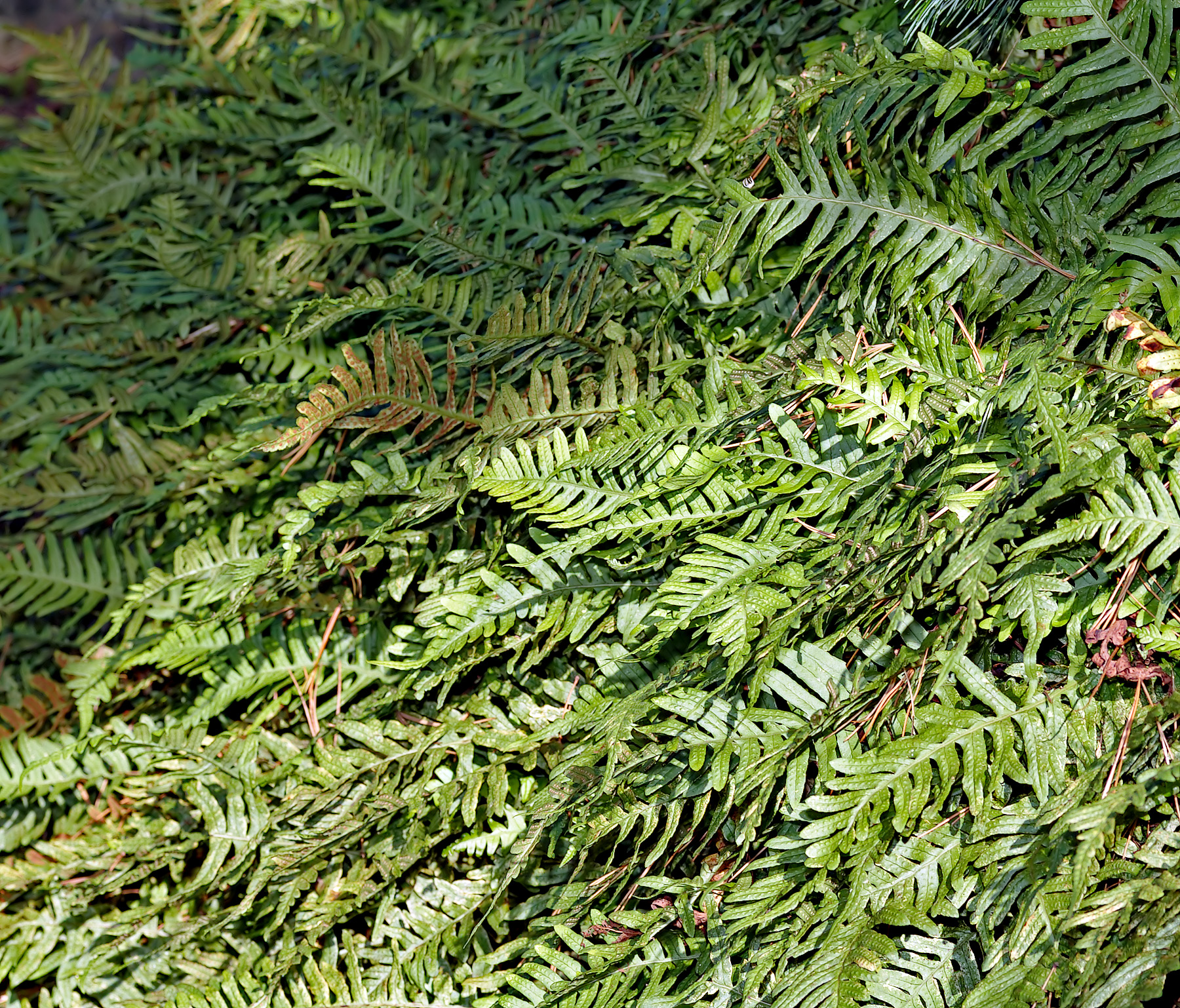
- Fronds of living Polypodium ferns
  †Polypodium – or unidentified comparable form
- †Pontolis – type locality for genus
  - †Pontolis magnus – type locality for species
- †Potamogeton
  - †Potamogeton parva
- †Potanospira
  - †Potanospira fryi
- †Praehyalocylis
  - †Praehyalocylis cretacea
- †Priscofusus
  - †Priscofusus coli – or unidentified comparable form
  - †Priscofusus geniculus
  - †Priscofusus medialis
  - †Priscofusus medialus
  - †Priscofusus stewarti
- †Pristichampsus
- †Procadurcodon – report made of unidentified related form or using admittedly obsolete nomenclature
- †Procamelus
  - †Procamelus grandis – or unidentified comparable form
- †Procerapex
  - †Procerapex bentsonae
- Proischyromys – type locality for genus
  - †Proischyromys perditus – type locality for species
- †Promartes – or unidentified comparable form
- †Promerycochoerus
  - †Promerycochoerus macrostegus
  - †Promerycochoerus superbus
- †Proneotherium – type locality for genus
  - †Proneotherium repenningi – type locality for species
- †Pronotolagus
- Propeamussium
  - †Propeamussium clallamensis – or unidentified comparable form
- †Prosomys
  - †Prosomys mimus – type locality for species
- †Prosthennops
  - †Prosthennops serus – tentative report
- †Proterozetes – type locality for genus
  - †Proterozetes ulysses – type locality for species
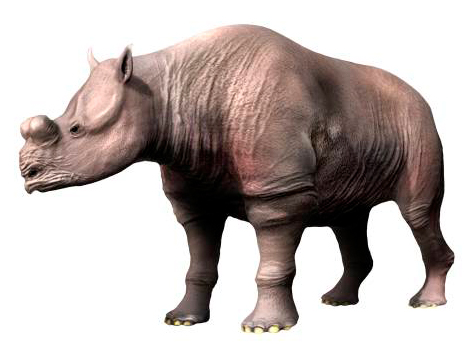
- Life restoration of the Eocene brontothere mammal Protitanops
  †Protitanops
  - †Protitanops curryi
- †Protolabis – or unidentified comparable form
- †Protorepomys – type locality for genus
- †Protospermophilus
  - †Protospermophilus malheurensis
- Protothaca
  - †Protothaca staleyi
- †Pruniticarpa
  - †Pruniticarpa cevallosii
- Prunus
  - †Prunus olsonii
  - †Prunus weinsteinii
- Psammacoma
  - †Psammacoma arctata
- †Psephophorus – tentative report
  - †Psephophorus oregonensis – type locality for species
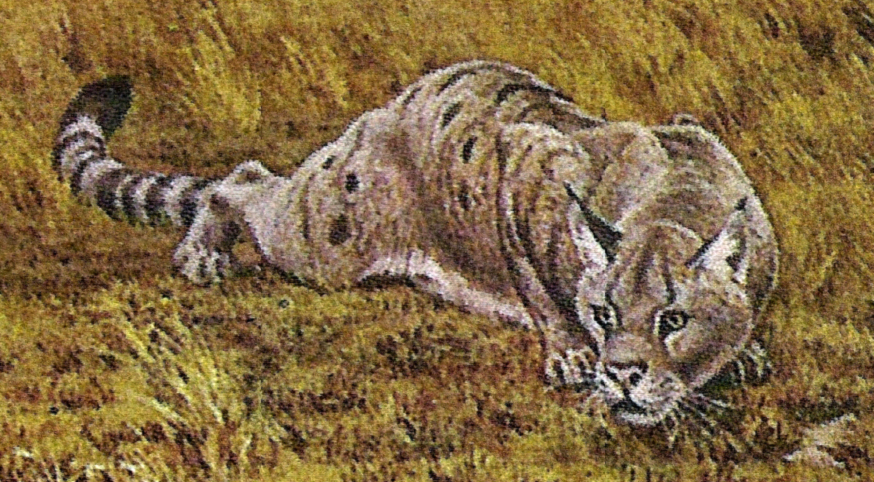
- Restoration of the Miocene cat Pseudaelurus
  †Pseudaelurus
- †Pseudoblastomeryx
  - †Pseudoblastomeryx advena
- †Pseudotheridomys
  - †Pseudotheridomys pagei
- †Pseudotomus
- †Pseudotrimylus
  - †Pseudotrimylus mawbyi
- †Pseudotsuga
  - †Pseudotsuga laticarpa
- Pteris
  - †Pteris silvicola
- Pterocarya
  - †Pterocarya mixta
  - †Pterocarya occidentalis
- †Pteronarctos – type locality for genus
  - †Pteronarctos goedertae – type locality for species
  - †Pteronarctos piersoni – type locality for species
- †Pteronepelys
  - †Pteronepelys wehrii
- †Pulvinisperma
  - †Pulvinisperma minutum
- Puncturella
  - †Puncturella galeata
- Pupillaria – tentative report
- Purpura
  - †Purpura foliata
  - †Purpura lurida
- Pyramidella – tentative report
- Pyrenacantha
  - †Pyrenacantha occidentalis
- †Pyrisemen
  - †Pyrisemen attenuatum
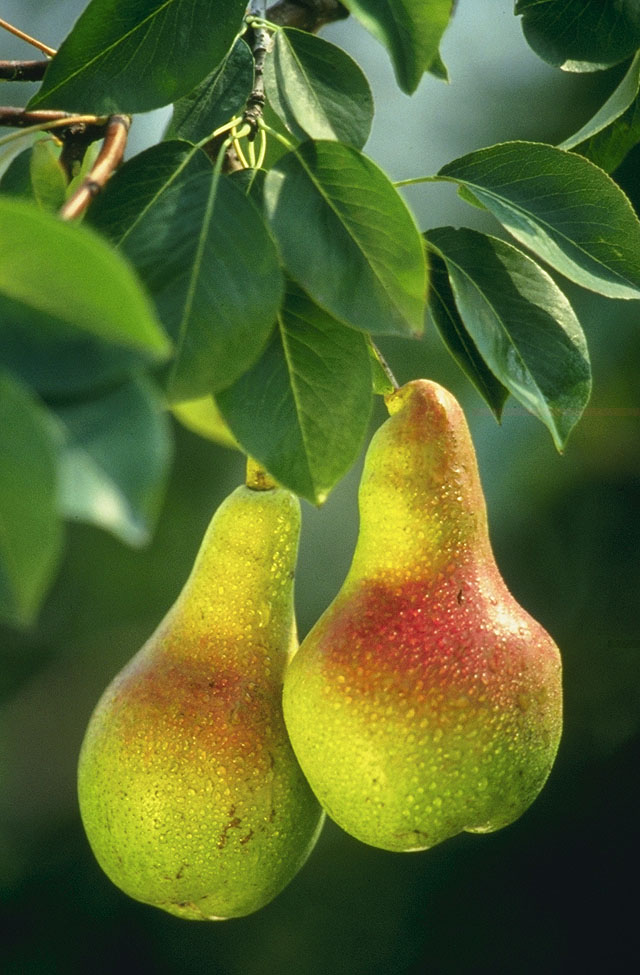
- Fruit of a living Pyrus, or pear tree
  †Pyrus
  - †Pyrus oregonensis

== Q ==
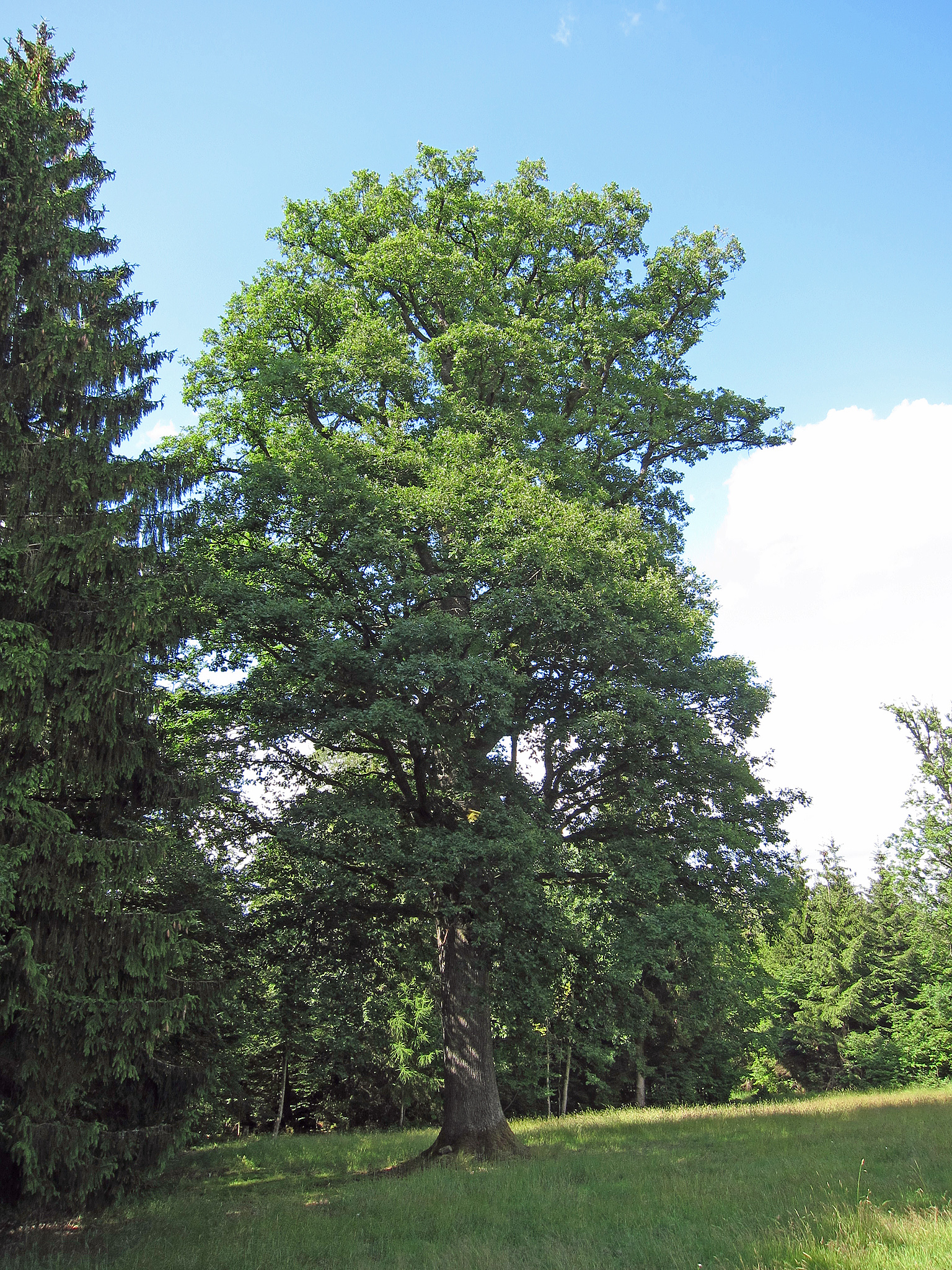
- A living Quercus, or oak tree
  Quercus
  - †Quercus berryi
  - †Quercus consimilis
  - †Quercus paleocarpa
- Querquedula
  - †Querquedula pullulans – type locality for species
- †Quintacava
  - †Quintacava velosida

== R ==
- Raja
- Rallus
  - †Rallus limicola
- Raninoides
  - †Raninoides washburnei
- Recurvirostra
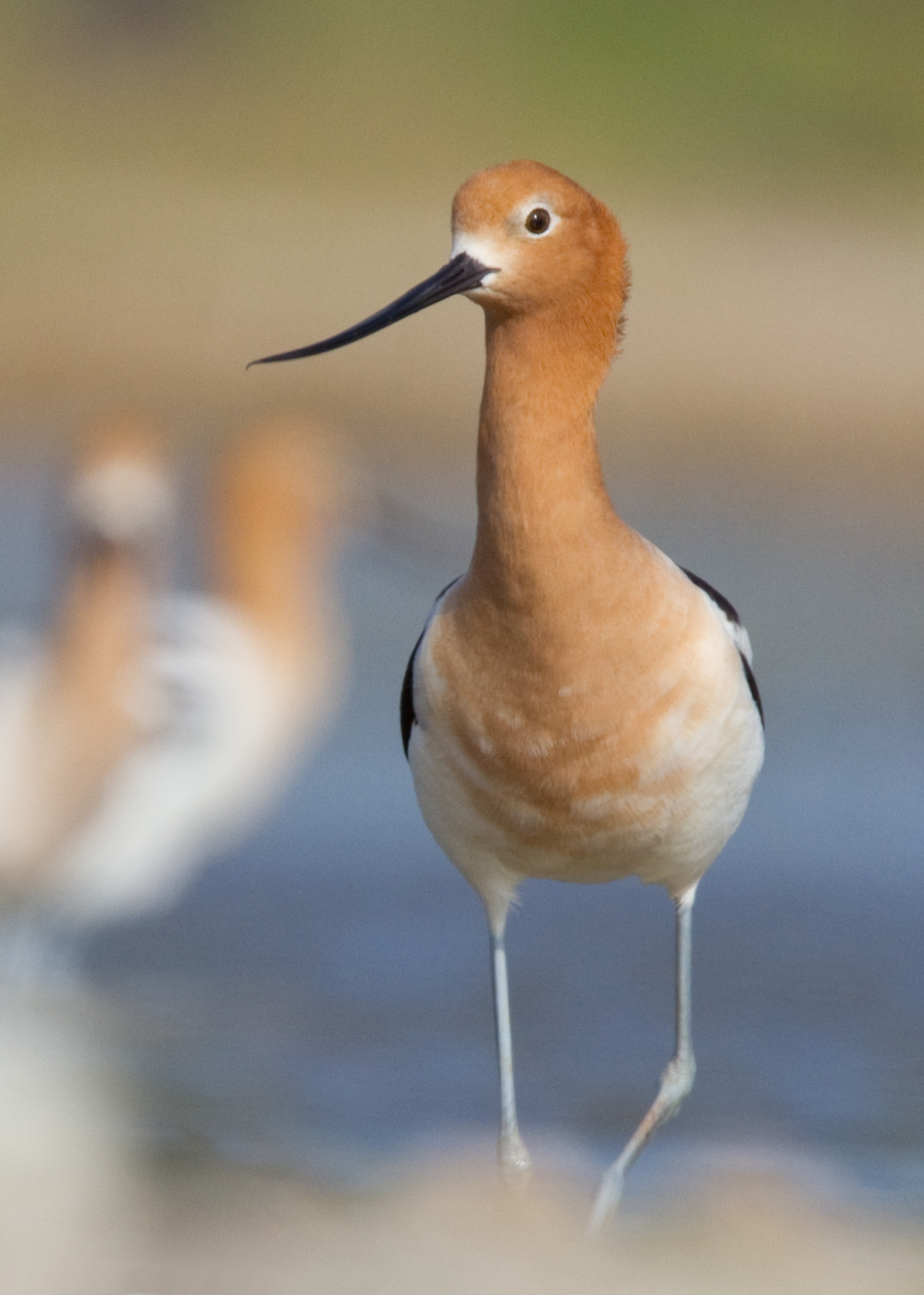
  - A living Recurvirostra americana, or American avocet
    †Recurvirostra americana
- Retusa
  - †Retusa petrosa
  - †Retusa tantilla
  - †Retusa turneri
- Rhabdus
  - †Rhabdus schencki
- †Rhizocyon
  - †Rhizocyon oregonensis
- Rhus
  - †Rhus lesquereuxii
  - †Rhus rooseae
  - †Rhus varians
- †Ribes
- Rimella
- Rosa
  - †Rosa hilliae
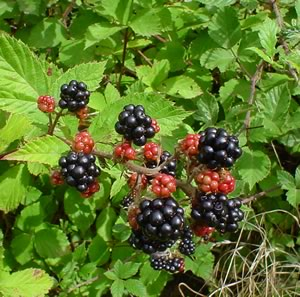
- A living member of Rubus, the genus including blackberries (pictured) and raspberries
  Rubus
  - †Rubus ameyeri
  - †Rubus fremdii
- †Rudiocyon – type locality for genus
  - †Rudiocyon amplidens – type locality for species
- †Rudiomys
  - †Rudiomys mcgrewi

== S ==
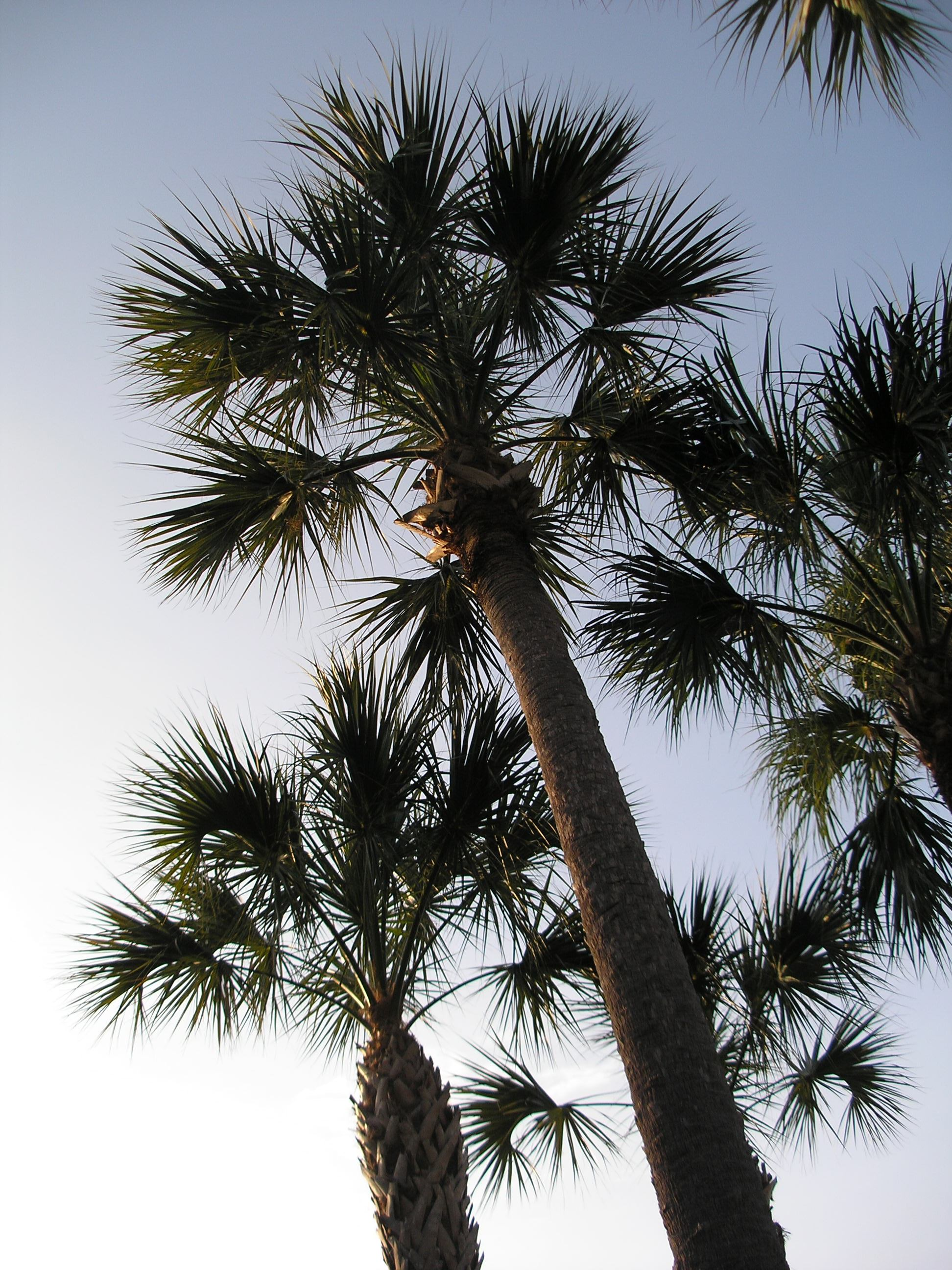
- Living Sabal, or palmettos
  Sabal
  - †Sabal bracknellense
  - †Sabal jenkinsii
- †Sabia
  - †Sabia prefoetida
- Saccella
  - †Saccella amelga
  - †Saccella calkinsi
- Salenia
  - †Salenia cascadensis – type locality for species
  - †Salix schimperi
- †Sambucuspermites
  - †Sambucuspermites rugulosus
- Sanguinolaria
  - †Sanguinolaria townsendensis
- †Saportaspermum
  - †Saportaspermum occidentalis
- Sargentodoxa
  - †* Sargentodoxa globosa – type locality for species
- Sassia
  - †Sassia bilineata
- Saxicavella
  - †Saxicavella burnsi
- Saxidomus
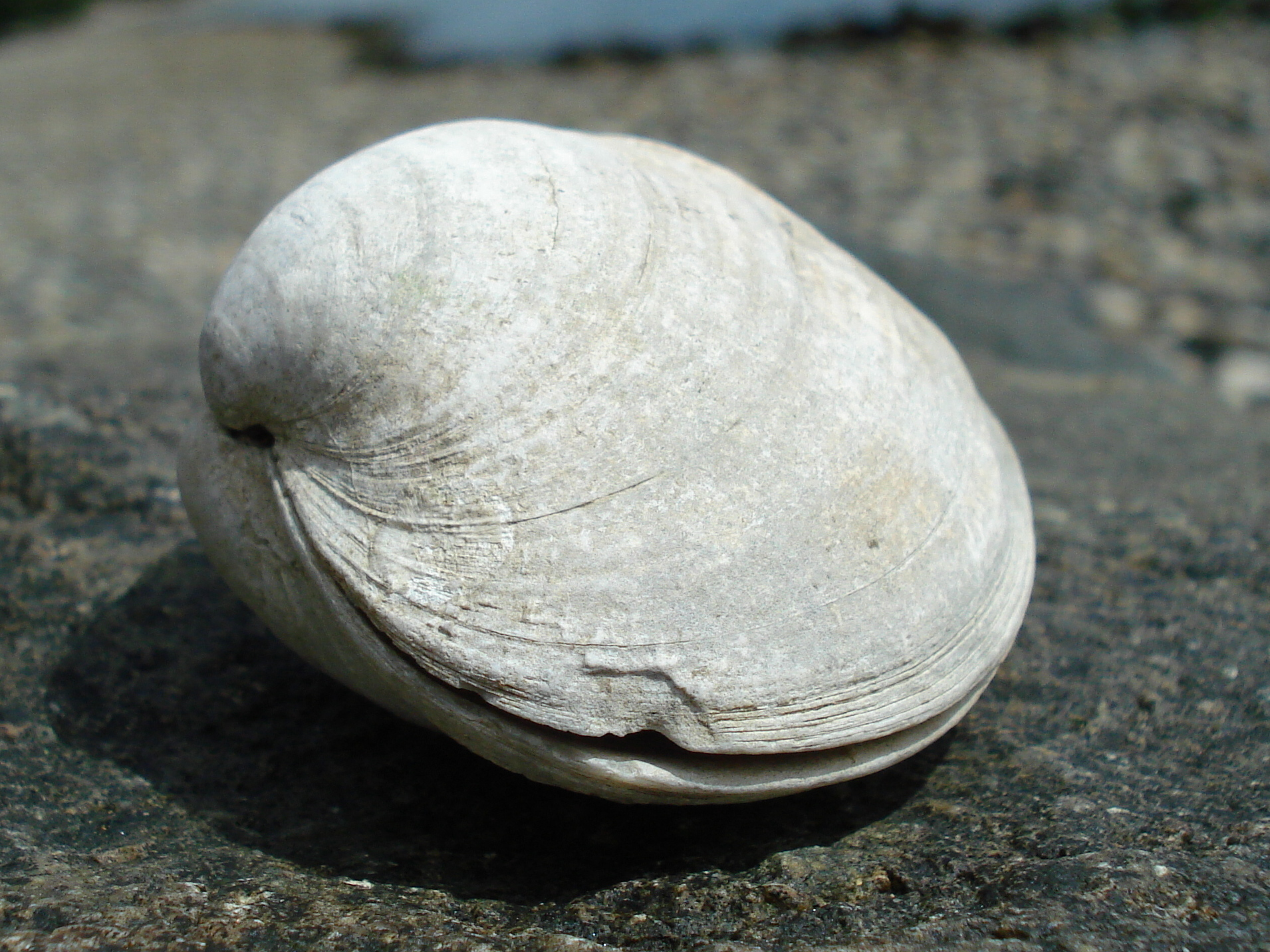
  - Shell of a living Saxidomus gigantea, or butter clam
    †Saxidomus gigantea
  - †Saxidomus giganteus
- †Saxifragispermum
  - †Saxifragispermum tetragonalis
- †Scabraecarpium
  - †Scabraecarpium clarnense
- †Scalaritheca
  - †Scalaritheca biseriata
- Scalina
  - †Scalina becki
  - †Scalina dickersoni – or unidentified related form
- †Scalopoides
  - †Scalopoides ripafodiator
- †Scapanoscapter
  - †Scapanoscapter simplicidens
- Scapanus
  - †Scapanus latimanus
  - †Scapanus proceridens
  - †Scapanus shultzi – or unidentified comparable form
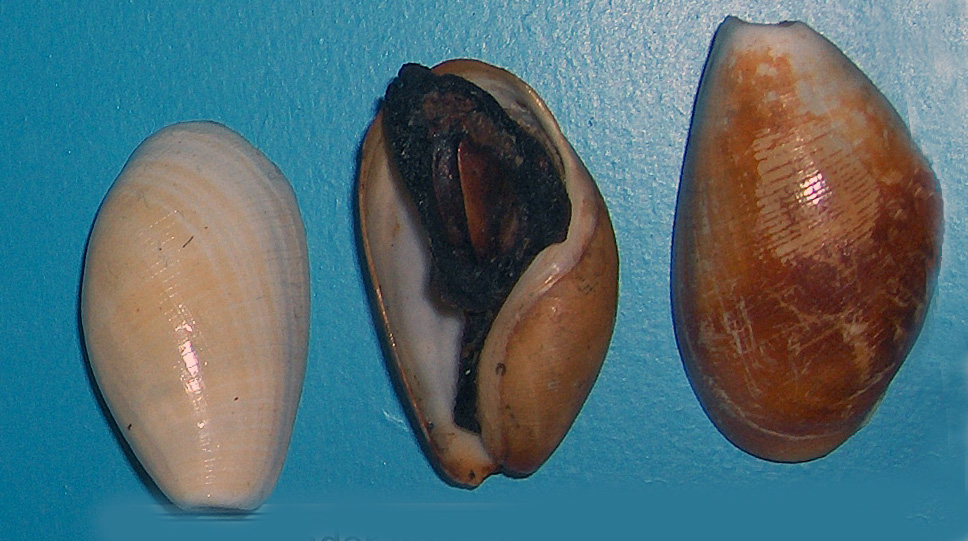
- Shells in multiple views of a Scaphander canoe bubble sea snail
  Scaphander
  - †Scaphander impuncatatus
  - †Scaphander impunctatus – type locality for species
  - †Scaphander stewarti
- †Scaphicarpium
  - †Scaphicarpium radiatum
- †Schisandra
  - †Schisandra oregonensis
- Schizaster
  - †Schizaster diabloensis
- †Schizodontomys
  - †Schizodontomys greeni
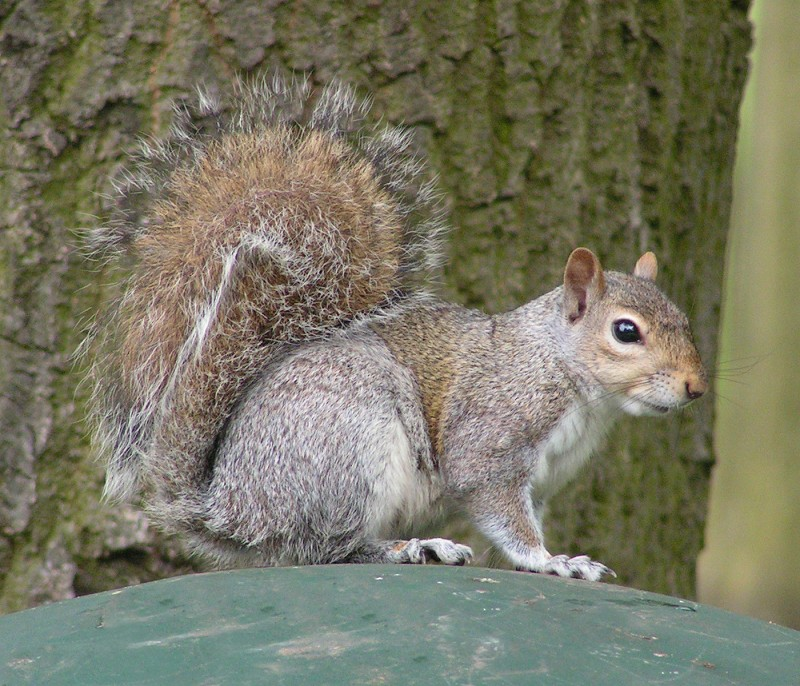
- A living Sciurus squirrel
  Sciurus
  - †Sciurus ballovianus
  - †Sciurus wortmani
- †Scolecophagus
  - †Scolecophagus affinis – type locality for species
- †Scutella
  - †Scutella gabbi
- Searlesia – tentative report
  - †Searlesia carlsoni
- Semele
  - †Semele willamettensis
- Sequoia
  - †Sequoia affinis
- †Seuku
  - †Seuku emlongi – type locality for species
- †Sewellelodon
  - †Sewellelodon predontia – or unidentified comparable form
- Sideroxylon
  - †sideroxylon? subangularis – type locality for species
- Siliqua
  - †Siliqua patula
- †Simocetus – type locality for genus
  - †Simocetus rayi – type locality for species
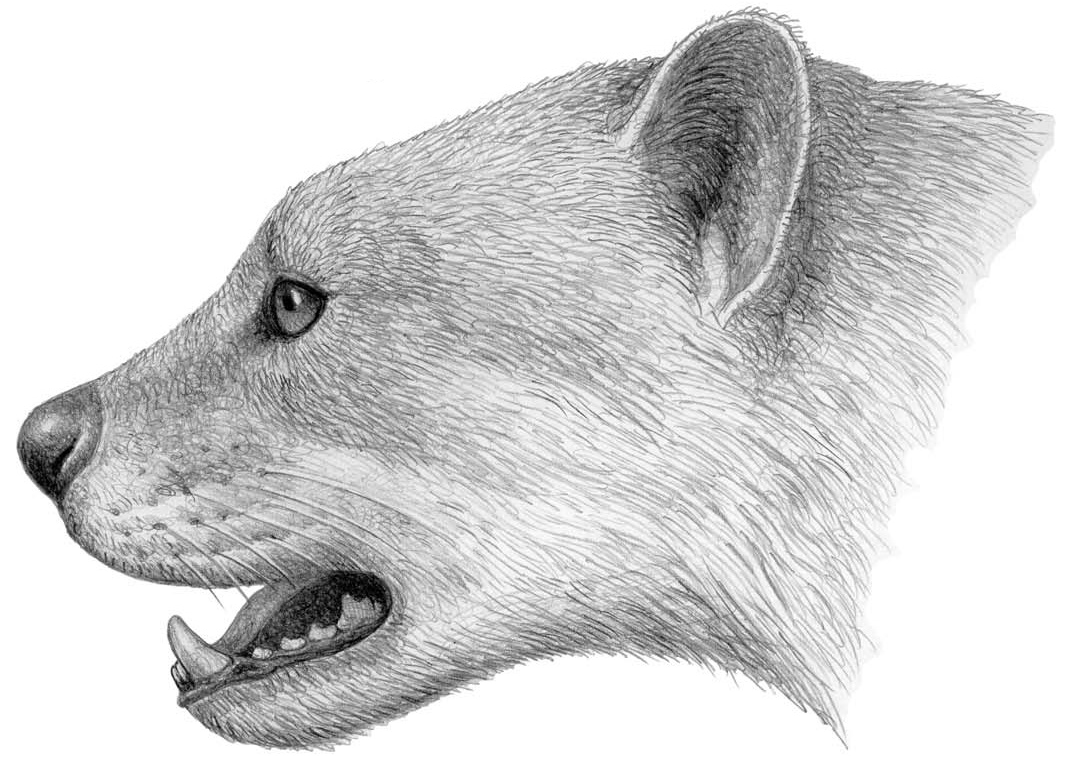
- Reconstruction of a fossilized skull and restorative portrait of the Miocene-Pliocene red panda relative Simocyon
  †Simocyon
  - †Simocyon primigenius
- Simomactra
  - †Simomactra falcata
- Sinum
  - †Sinum obliquum
  - †Sinum scopulosum
- Solariella
  - †Solariella cicca – type locality for species
  - †Solariella cidaris
- Solemya
  - †Solemya ventricosa
- Solen
  - †Solen sicarius
  - †Solen townsendensis
- Solena
  - †Solena conradi
  - †Solena eugenensis
  - †Solena novacularis
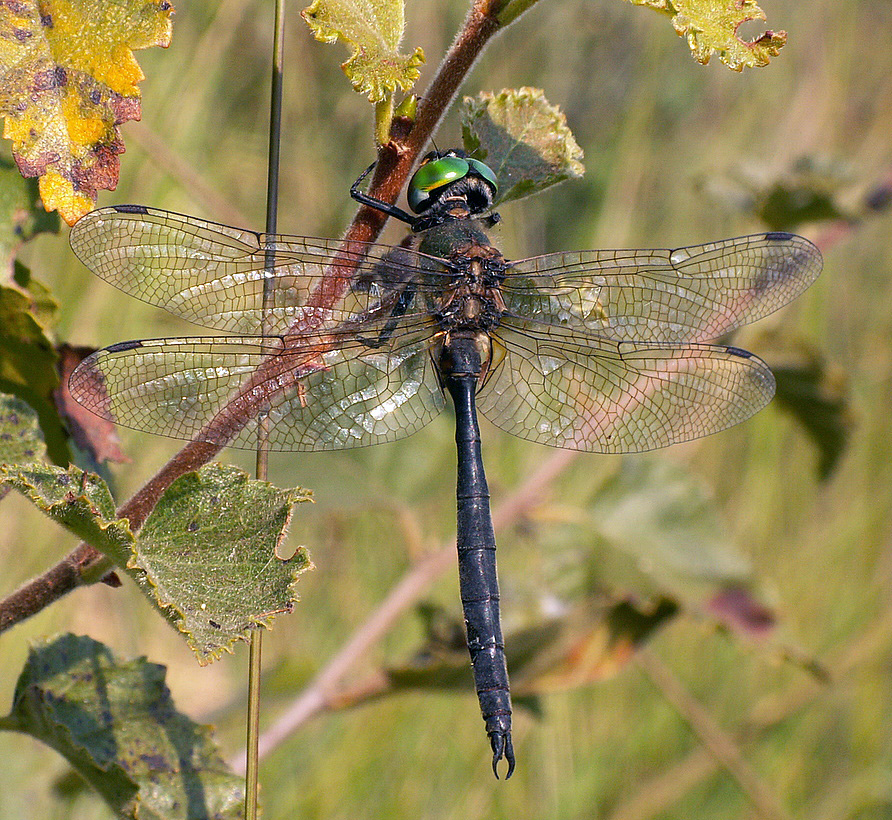
- A living Somatochlora dragonfly
  †Somatochlora
  - †Somatochlora oregonica – type locality for species
- Spermophilus
  - †Spermophilus gidleyi
  - †Spermophilus mckayensis
  - †Spermophilus shotwelli
  - †Spermophilus tephrus
  - †Spermophilus wilsoni
- †Sphaerosperma
  - †Sphaerosperma riesii
- †Sphenophalos
- †Sphenosperma
  - †Sphenosperma baccatum
- †Spirocrypta
  - †Spirocrypta pileum
- Spirotropis
  - †Spirotropis calodius
  - †Spirotropis kincaidi
  - †Spirotropis washingtonensis
- Spisula
  - †Spisula densata
  - †Spisula eugenensis
- Spizaetus
  - †Spizaetus pliogryps
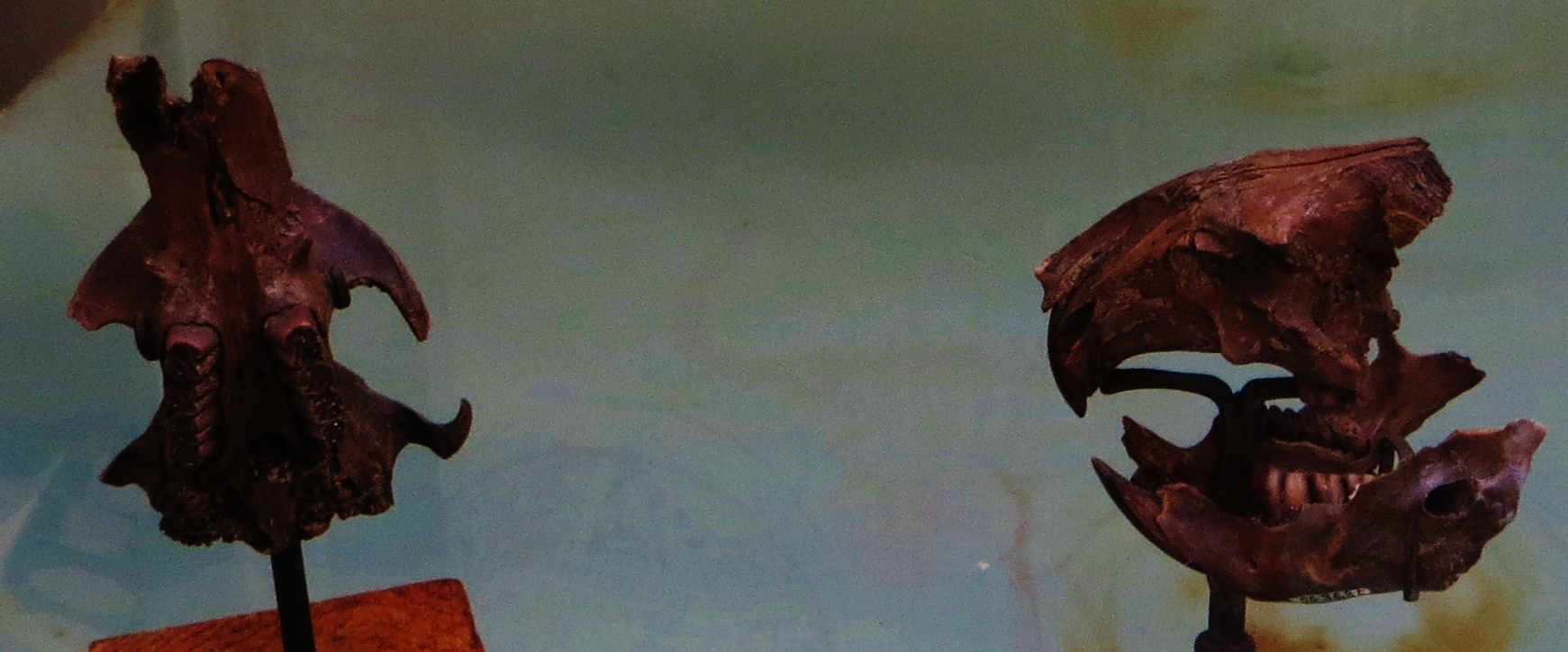
- Fossilized partial skulls of the rodent Oligocene-Miocene Steneofiber
  †Steneofiber
  - †Steneofiber gradatus
- Stephanodiscus
  - †Stephanodiscus excentricus
  - †Stephanodiscus niagarae
  - †Stephanodiscus rhombus – type locality for species
- Stercorarius
  - †Stercorarius schufeldti – type locality for species
- Sterna
  - †Sterna elegans – tentative report
  - †Sterna forsteri
  - †Sterna fosteri – tentative report
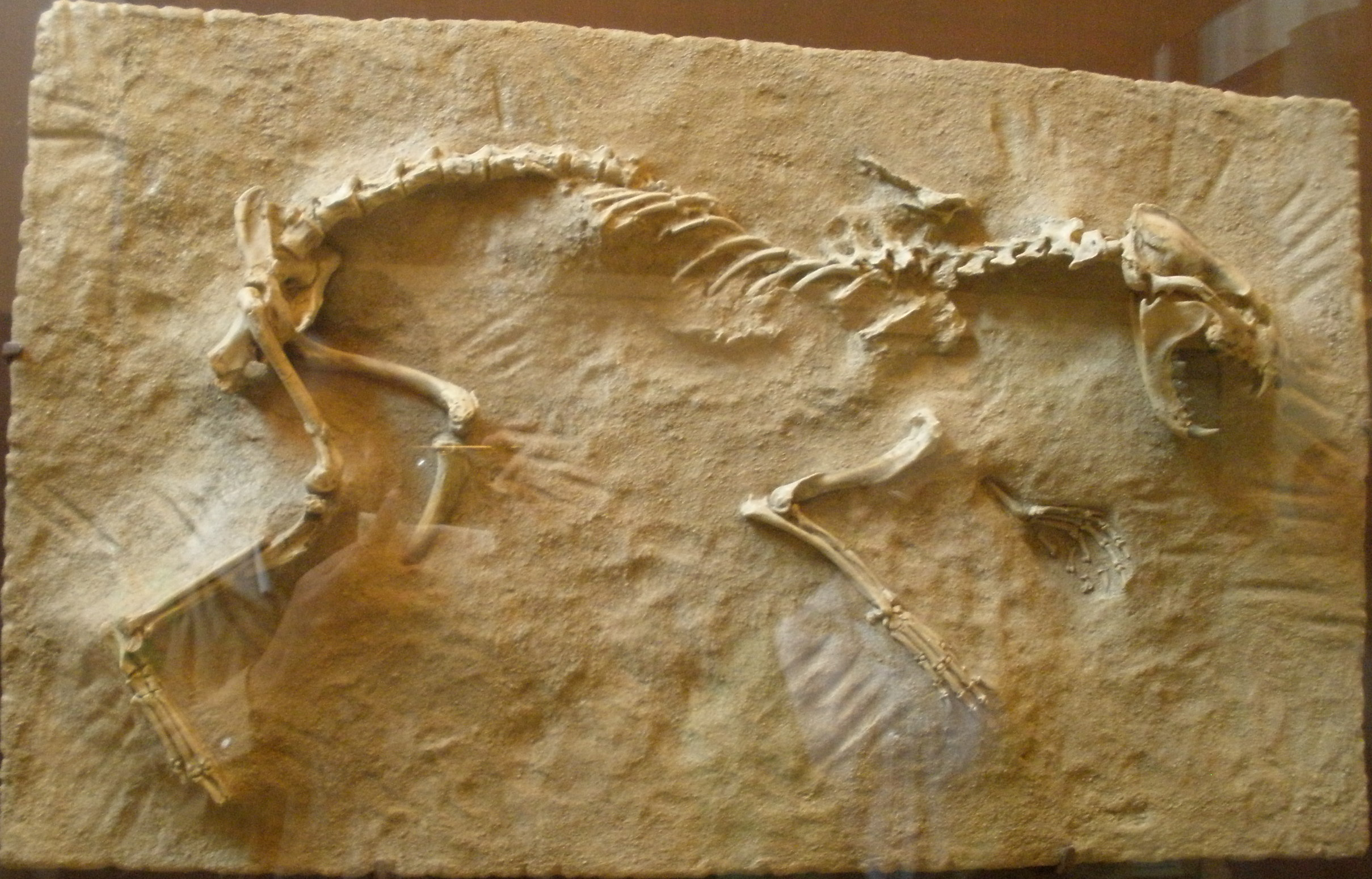
- Fossilized skeleton of the Miocene weasel Sthenictis
  Sthenictis
  - †Sthenictis junturensis – type locality for species
- †Stichopsammia – tentative report
  - †Stichopsammia vokesi
- †Stockeycarpa
  - †Stockeycarpa globosa
- †Stomechinus
  - †Stomechinus dissimilaris – type locality for species
- †Striatisperma
  - †Striatisperma coronapunctatum
- Strongylocentrotus
- Sturnella
- †Suavodrillia
  - †Suavodrillia winlockensis
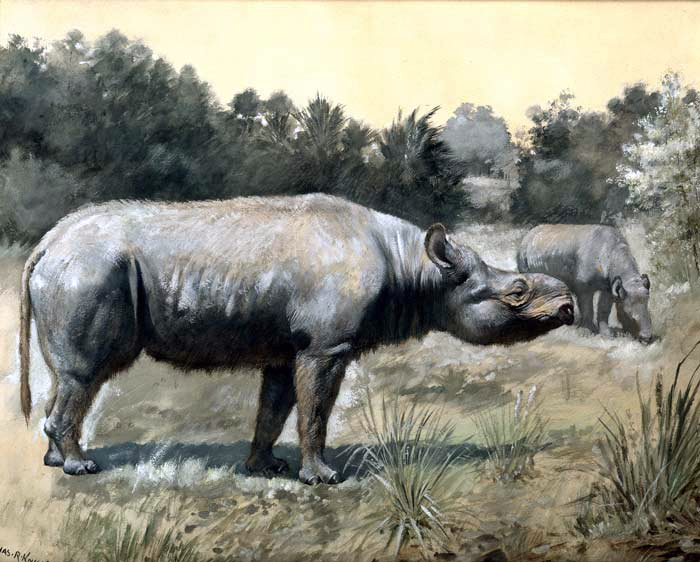
- Life restoration of the Eocene-Oligocene cow-sized rhinoceros Subhyracodon. Charles R. Knight (1890s).
  †Subhyracodon
- Surculites
  - †Surculites condonana
  - †Surculites wynoocheensis
- Sveltella
  - †Sveltella exiliplex
  - †Sveltella keaseyensis – type locality for species
- Symplocos
  - †Symplocos nooteboomii

== T ==
- †Tanyoplatanus
  - †Tanyoplatanus cranei
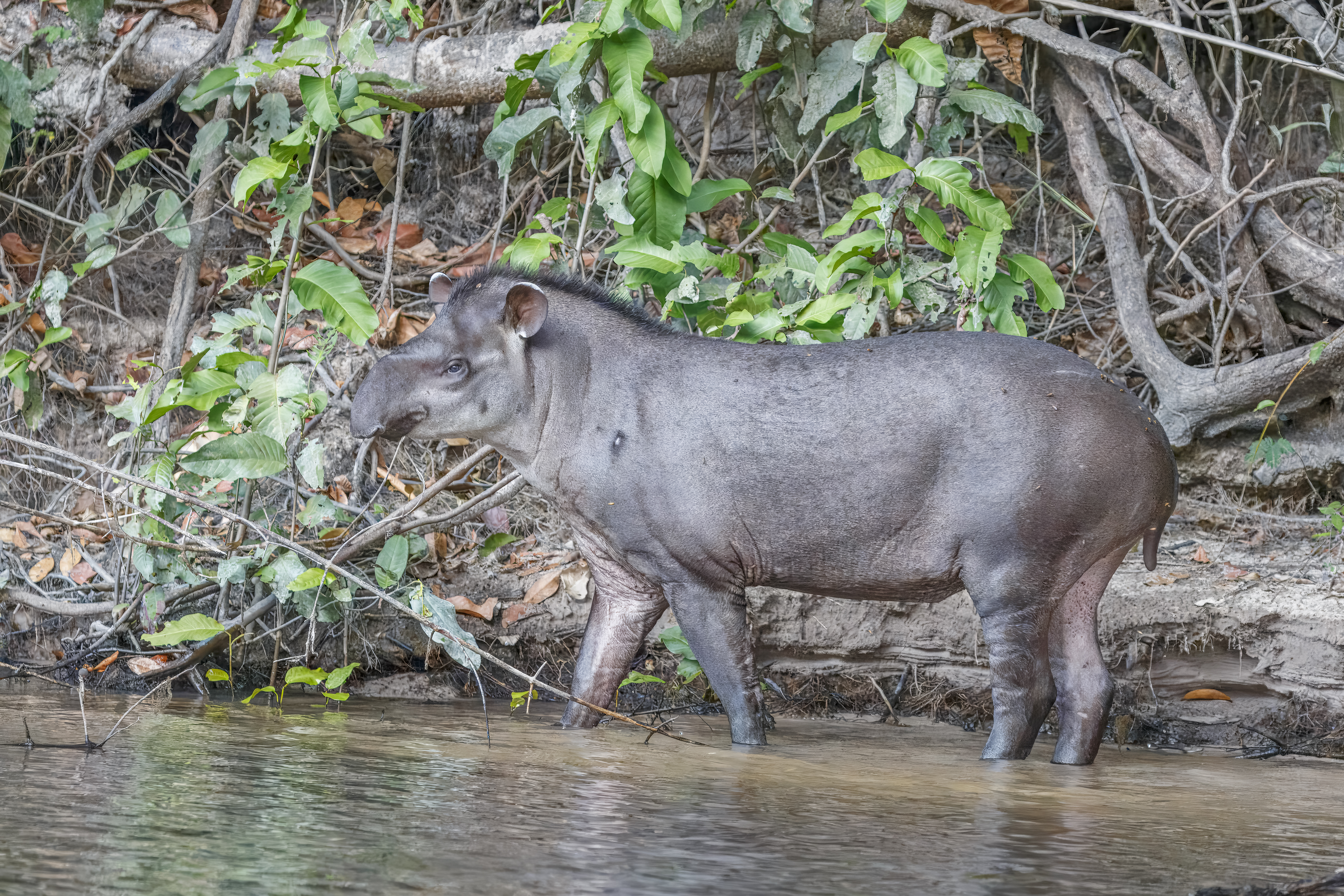
- A living Tapirus, or tapir
  Tapirus
  - †Tapirus californicus – or unidentified comparable form
- Tapiscia
  - †Tapiscia occidentalis
- Taranis
  - †Taranis columbiana
- †Tardontia
  - †Tardontia occidentale – or unidentified comparable form
- Taxidea
- †Taxus
  - †Taxus masonii
- Tegula
  - †Tegula stantoni
- †Tejonia
  - †Tejonia moragai
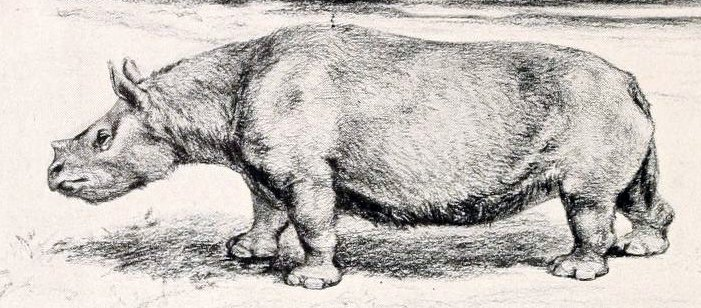
- Restoration of the Miocene-Pliocene rhinoceros Teleoceras
  †Teleoceras
  - †Teleoceras fossiger
  - †Teleoceras hicksi
  - †Teleoceras medicornutum
- †Teletaceras
  - †Teletaceras radinskyi – type locality for species
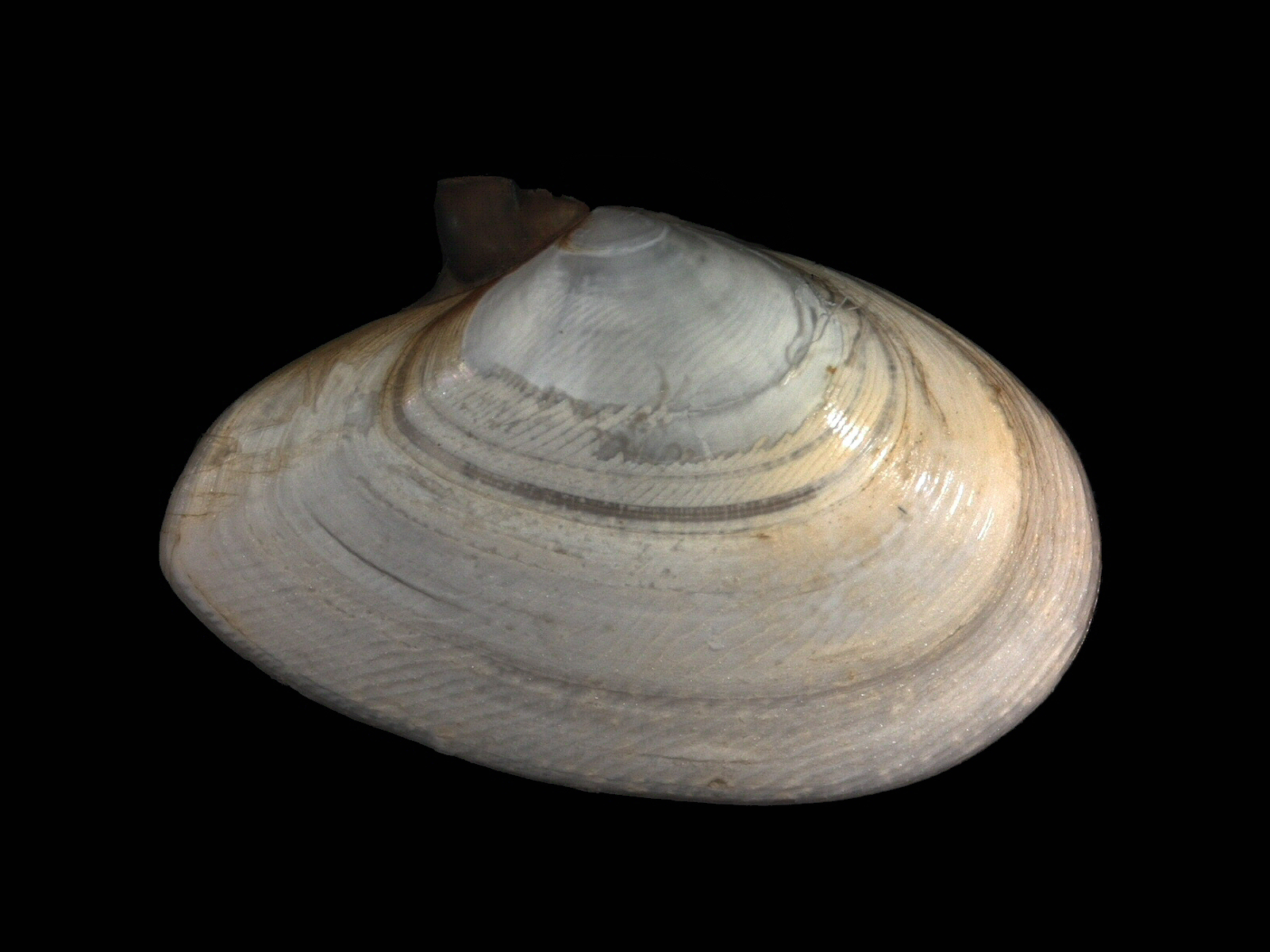
- Shell of a Tellina, or tellin
  Tellina
  - †Tellina aduncanasa
  - †Tellina aragonia
  - †Tellina emacerata
  - †Tellina eugenia
  - †Tellina idae – or unidentified related form
  - †Tellina lincolnensis
  - †Tellina pittsburgensis
  - †Tellina quasimacoma
- †Temnocyon
  - †Temnocyon altigenis
  - †Temnocyon fingeruti – type locality for species
- †Tenudomys – or unidentified comparable form
- †Tenuisperma
  - †Tenuisperma ellipticum
- †Tephrocyon
  - †Tephrocyon rurestris
- Terebratalia
  - †Terebratalia occidentalis
- Terebratulina
  - †Terebratulina unguicula
- Terminalia
  - †Terminalia oregona
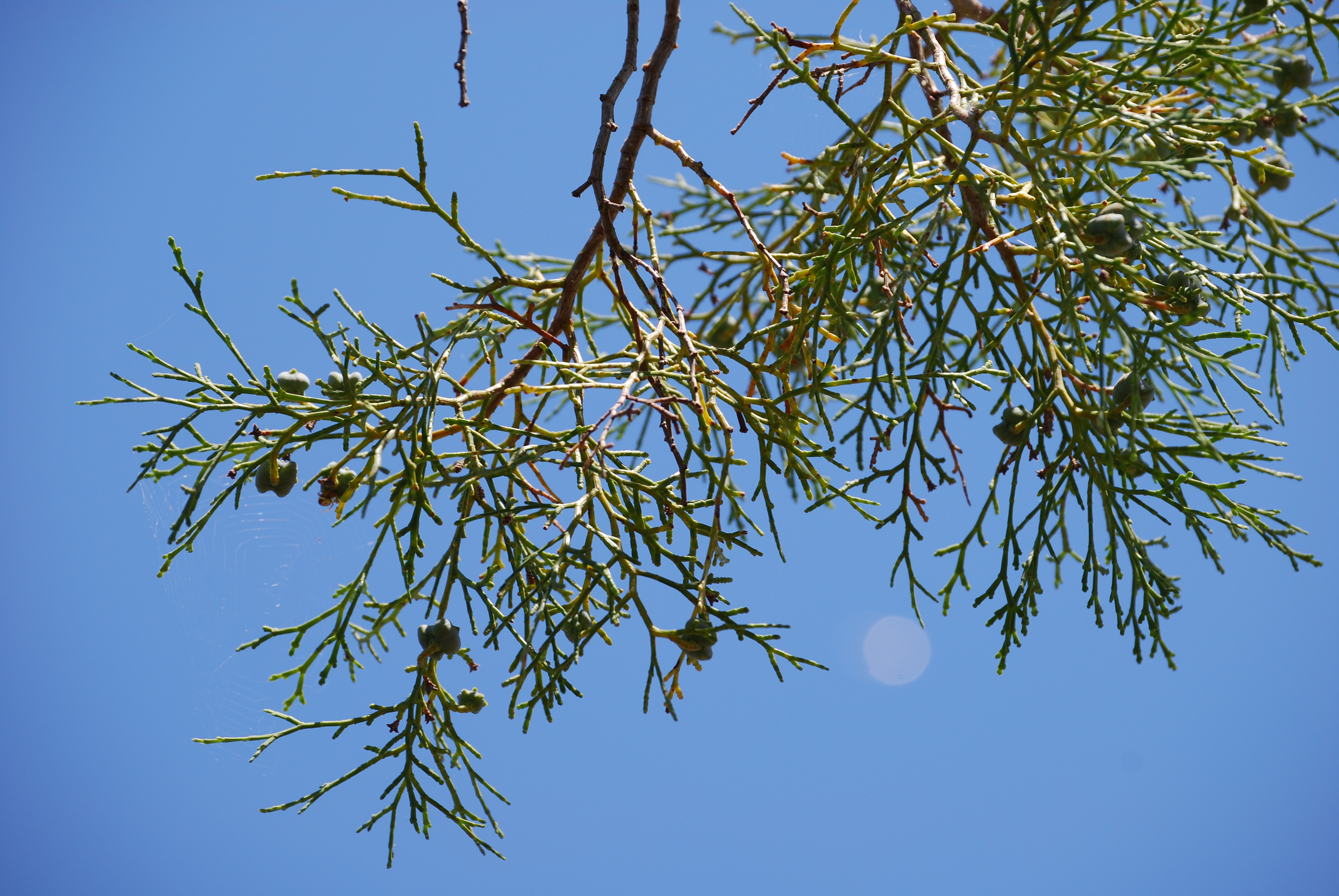
- Foliage and cones of a living Tetraclinis, or arar tree
  †Tetraclinis
  - †Tetraclinis potlachensis
- Thais
  - †Thais lamellosa
  - †Thais lima – or unidentified related form
- †Thanikaimonia
  - †Thanikaimonia geniculata
- Thesbia – report made of unidentified related form or using admittedly obsolete nomenclature
  - †Thesbia antiselli: synonym of † Xenoturris antiselli (F. Anderson & B. Martin, 1914)
- †Thinohyus
  - †Thinohyus lentus
- Thomomys
  - †Thomomys townsendii
- Thracia
  - †Thracia condoni
  - †Thracia keaseyensis – type locality for species
  - †Thracia trapezoides
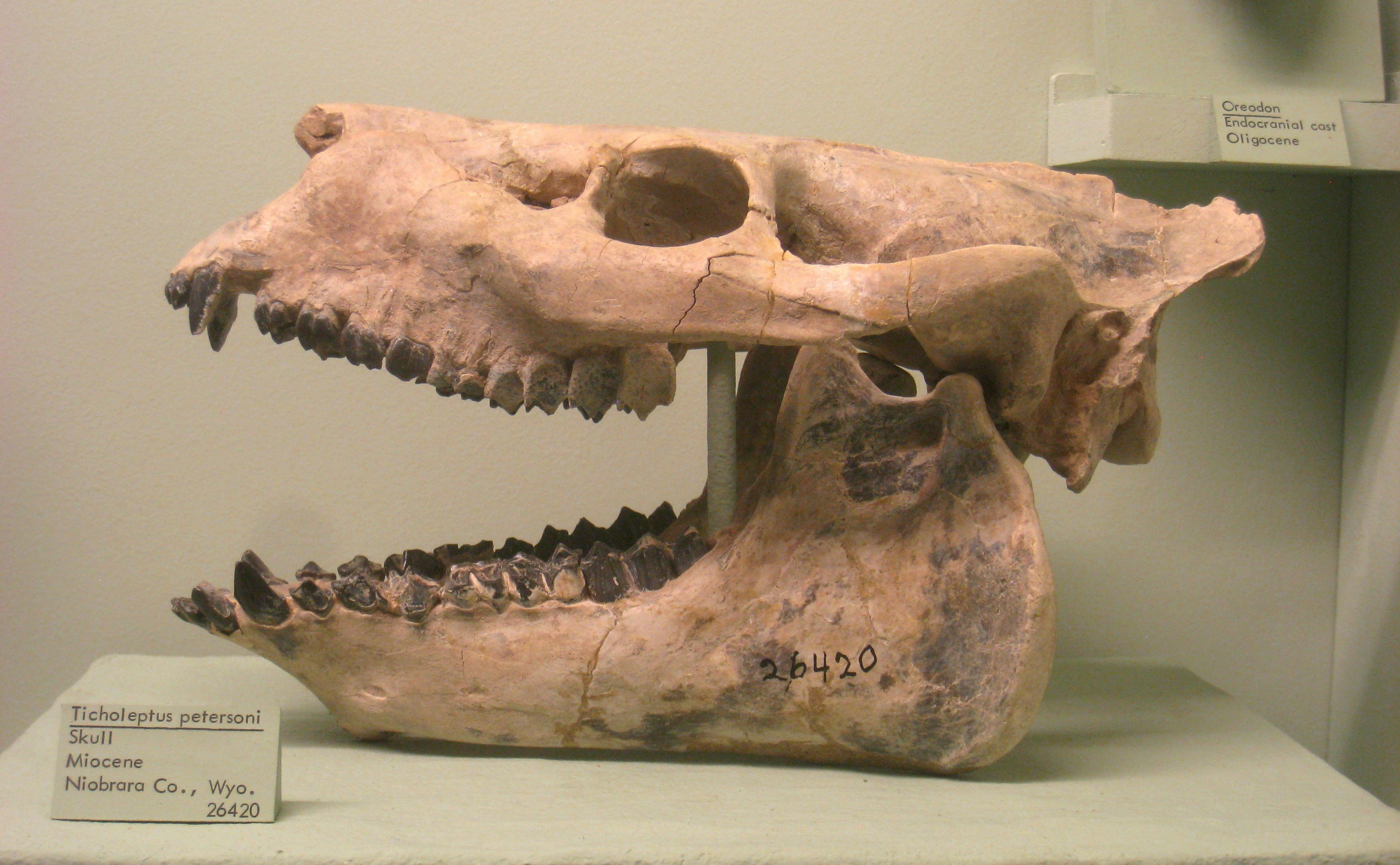
- Fossilized skull of the Miocene oreodont mammal Ticholeptus
  †Ticholeptus
  - †Ticholeptus zygomaticus
- †Ticholepus
  - †Ticholepus zygomaticus
- †Tiffneycarpa
  - †Tiffneycarpa scleroidea
- Tilia
  - †Tilia aspera
  - †Tilia circularis
  - †Tilia fossilensis
  - †Tilia lamottei
  - †Tilia pedunculata
  - †Tilia penduculata
- †Tinomiscoidea
  - †Tinomiscoidea occidentalis
- Tinospora
  - †Tinospora elongata
  - †Tinospora hardmanae
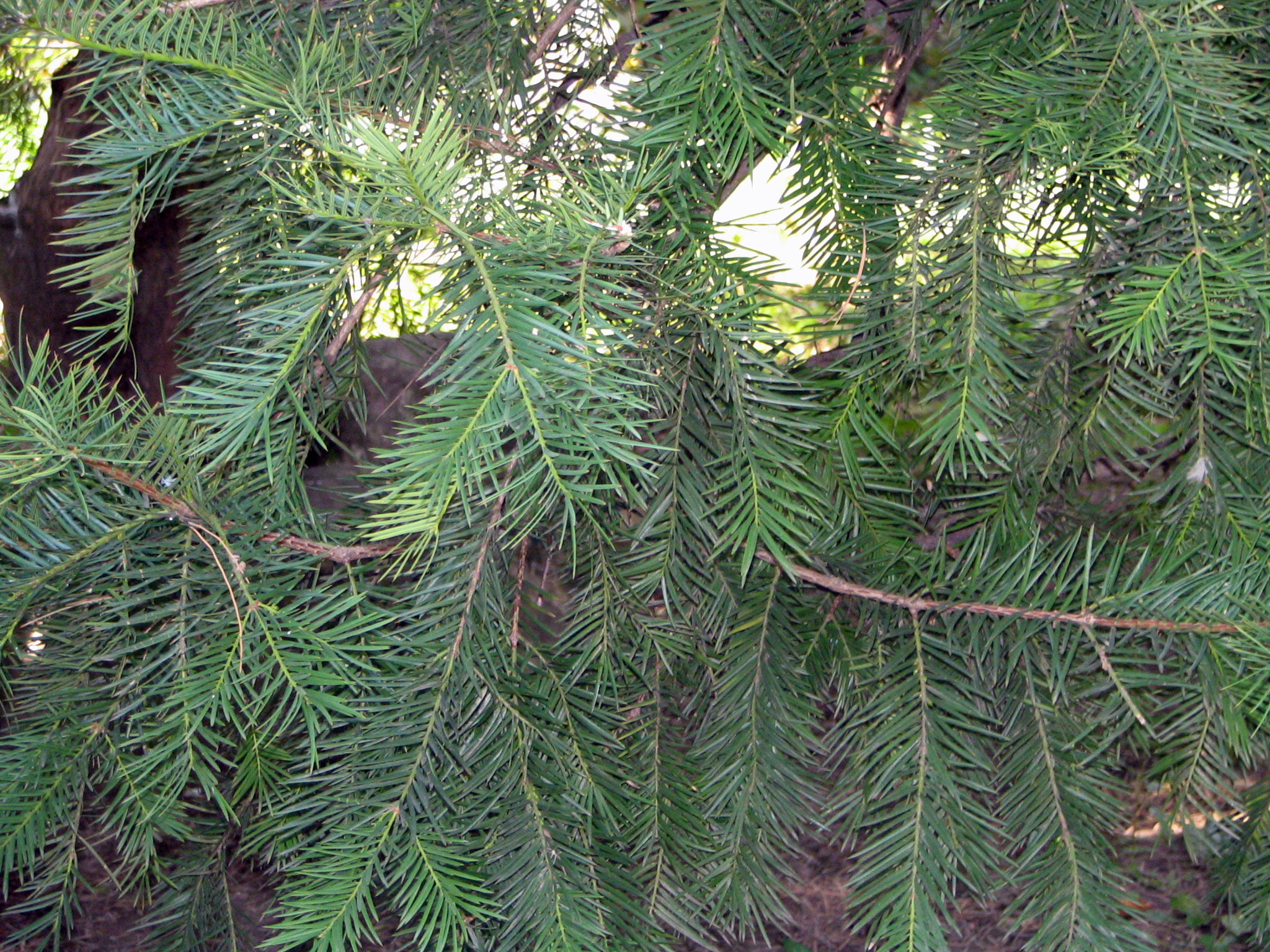
- Foliage of a living Torreya, or nutmeg yew
  †Torreya
  - †Torreya clarnensis
  - †Torreya masonii
- Totanus
  - †Totanus melanoleucas
- †Toxicodendron
  - †Toxicodendron wolfei
- Trema
  - †Trema nucilecta
- Tresus
  - †Tresus pajaroanus
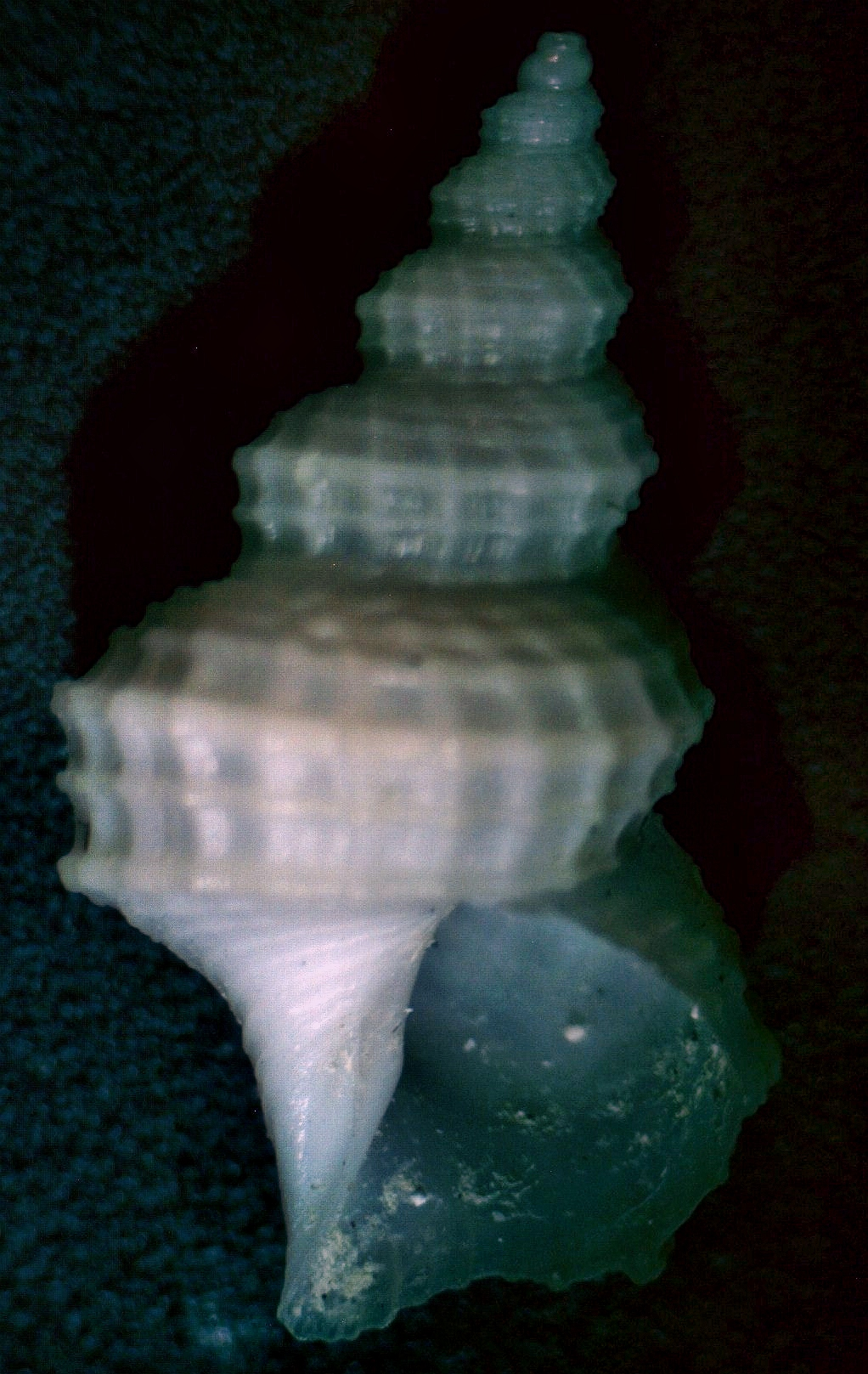
- Shell of a Trichotropis cap sea snail
  Trichotropis
  - †Trichotropis cancellata
  - †Trichotropis insignis
- †Trigonostela
  - †Trigonostela oregonensis
- †Tripartisemen
  - †Tripartisemen bonesii
- †Triplascapha
  - †Triplascapha collinsonae
- †Triplexivalva
  - †Triplexivalva rugata
- †Triplochitioxylon – type locality for genus
  - †Triplochitioxylon oregonensis – type locality for species
- †Trisepticarpium
  - †Trisepticarpium minutum
- †Tritonifusus
  - †Tritonifusus rectirostis
- Trochita
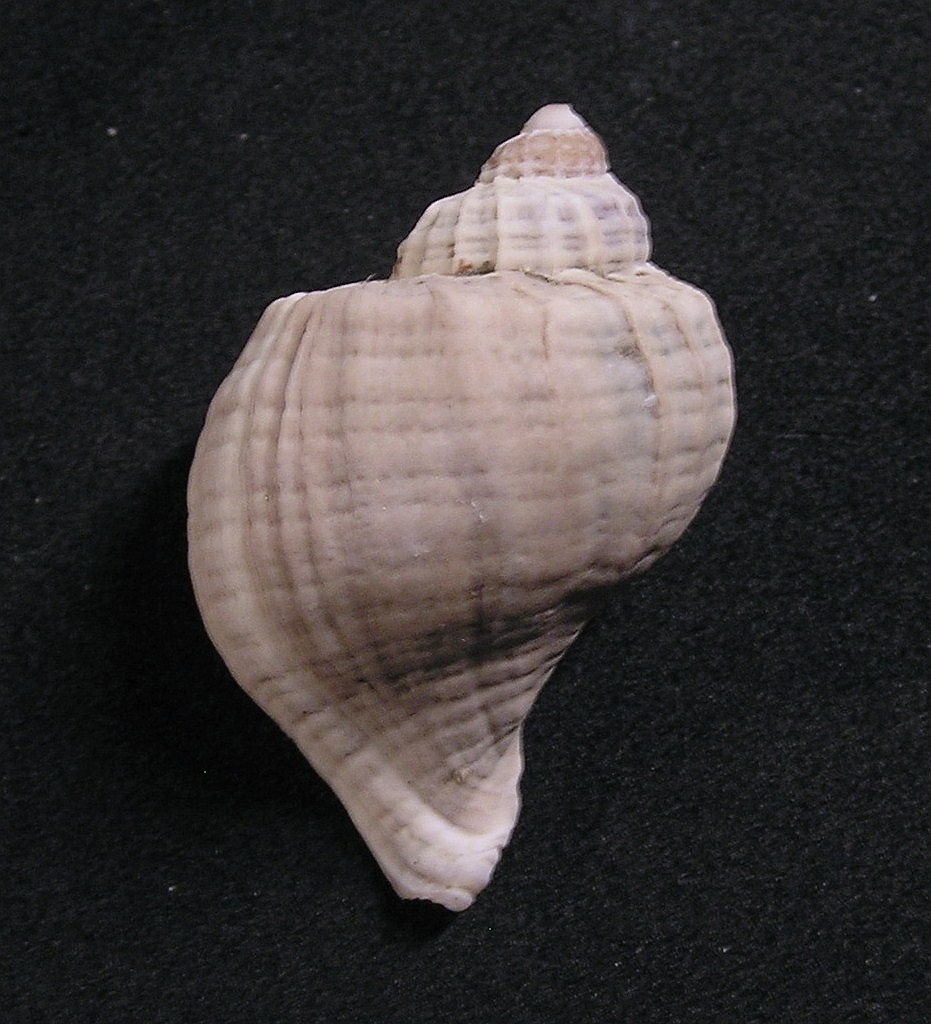
- Shell of a Trophon murex snail
  Trophon
  - †Trophon halibrectus
  - †Trophon kernensis
  - †Trophon platacantha – type locality for species
- †Truncatisemen
  - †Truncatisemen sapotoides
- †Tsaphanomys – type locality for genus
  - †Tsaphanomys shotwelli
- †Tsuga
  - †Tsuga sonomensis
- Turricula
  - †Turricula emerita
  - †Turricula keaseyensis
- †Turrinosyrinx
  - †Turrinosyrinx nodifera
  - †Turrinosyrinx nodilifera
  - †Turrinosyrinx packardi – or unidentified comparable form
- Turris
  - †Turris coli
  - †Turris impecunia
  - †Turris perversa
  - †Turris smithi
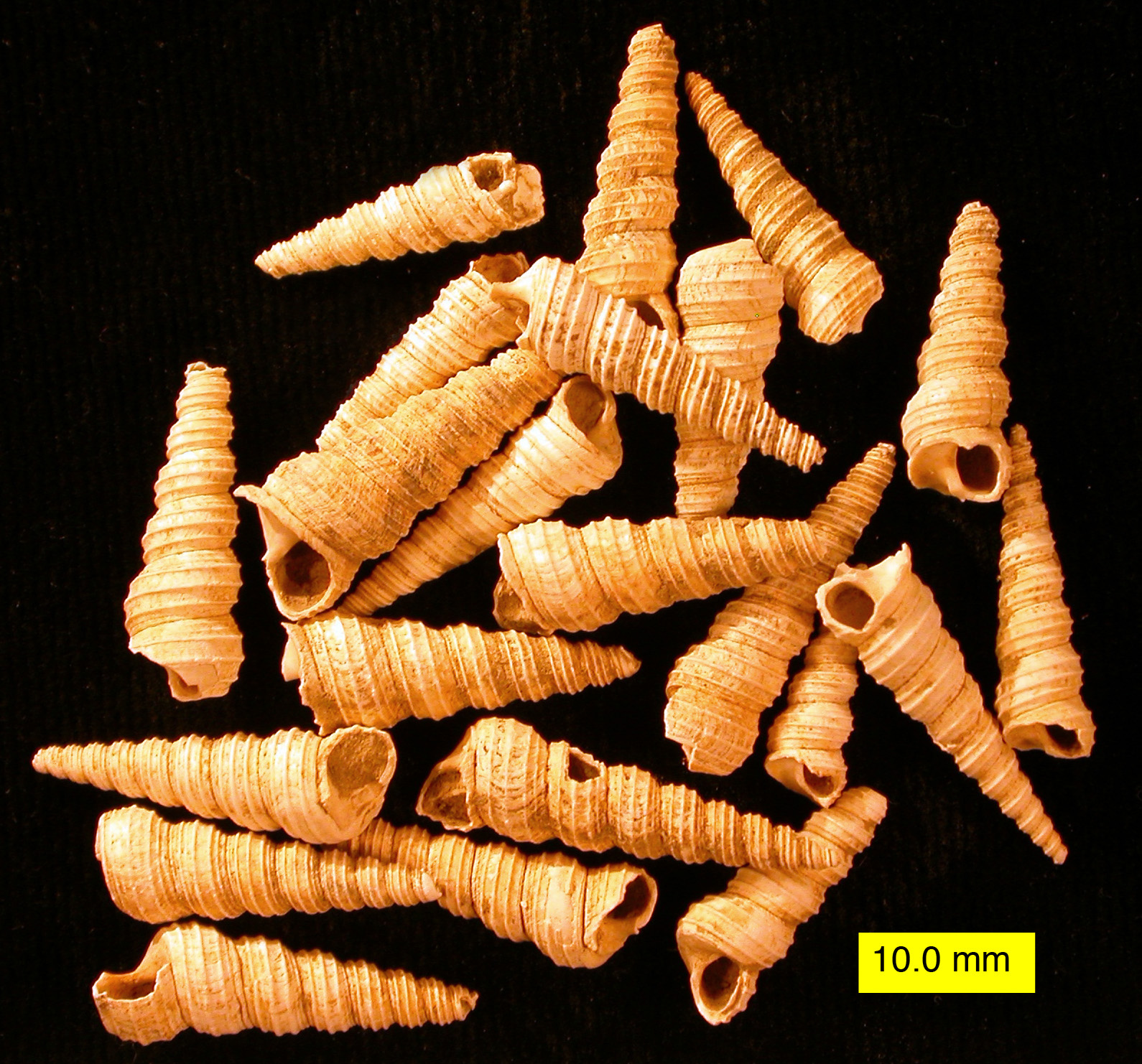
- Fossilized shells of the Late Jurassic-modern tower snail Turritella
  Turritella
  - †Turritella buwaldana
  - †Turritella keaseyense
  - †Turritella keaseyensis – type locality for species
  - †Turritella oregonensis
  - †Turritella pittsburgensis
  - †Turritella uvasana
- †Tylocephalonyx
- Tympanuchus
  - †Tympanuchus pallidicinctus
- †Typhoides
  - †Typhoides buzekii

== U ==
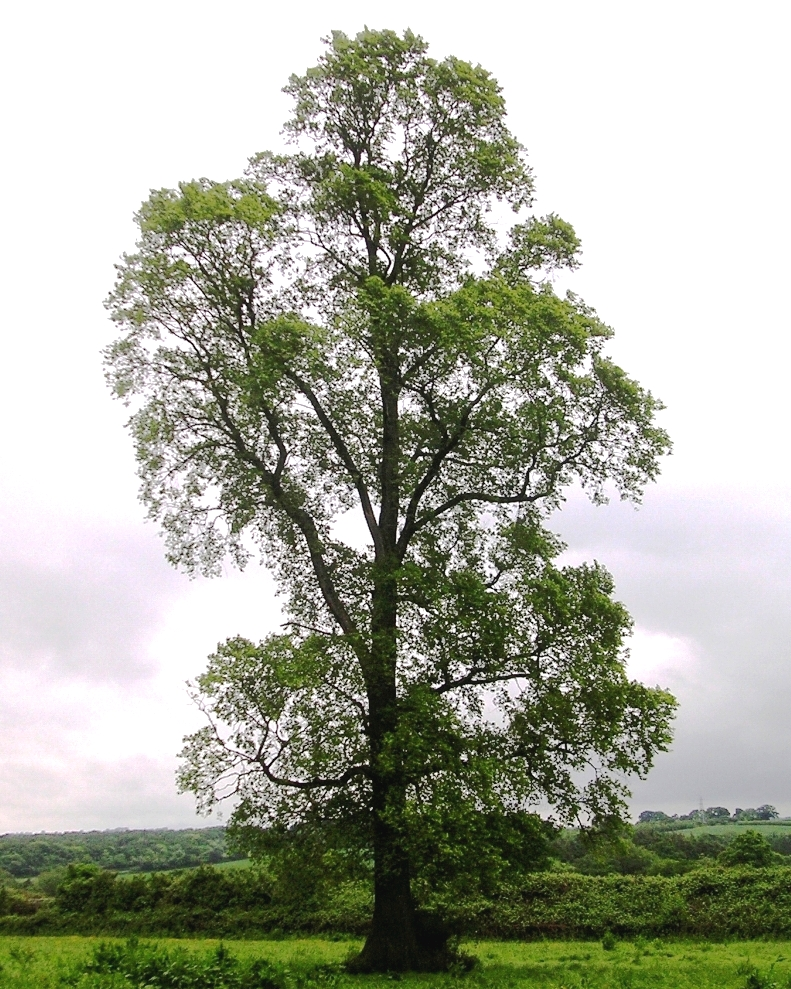
- A living Ulmus, or elm
  Ulmus
  - †Ulmus chaneyi
  - †Ulmus speciosa
- †Ulospermum
  - †Ulospermum hardingae
- †Unknown
- †Unknown dicotyledonous
- †Unknown monocotyledonous
- †Ursavus
  - †Ursavus primaevus – or unidentified comparable form

== V ==
- Venericardia
  - †Venericardia aragonia – or unidentified comparable form
  - †Venericardia hornii
  - †Venericardia merriami – or unidentified comparable form
  - †Venericardia planicosta
- †Vertipecten
  - †Vertipecten fucanus – or unidentified comparable form
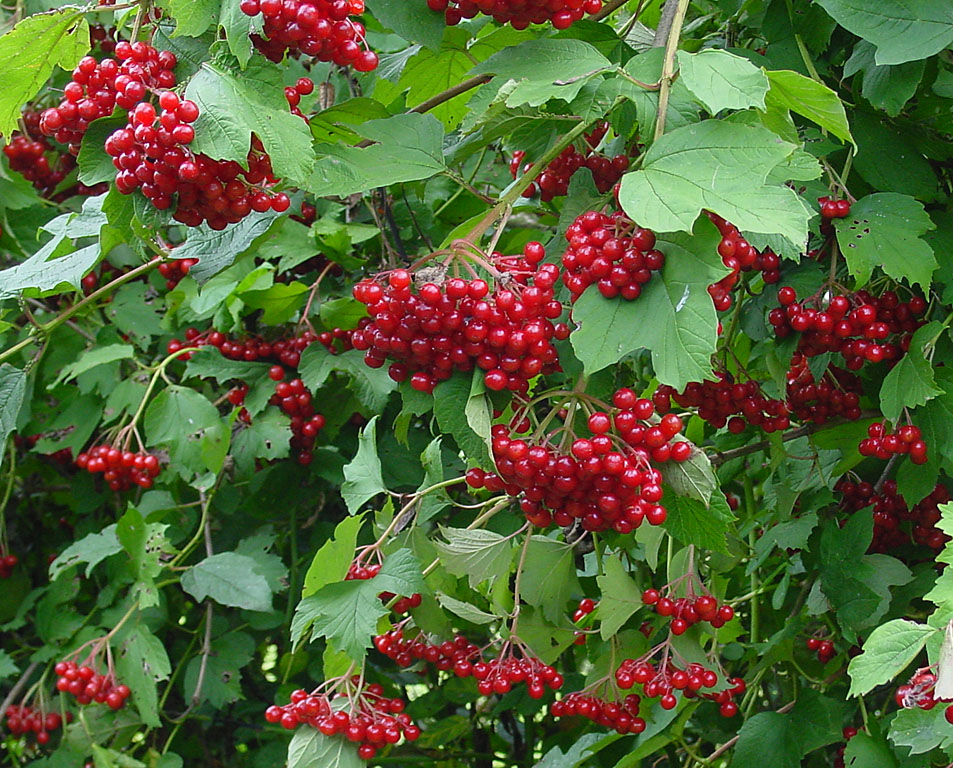
- Leaves and fruit of a living Viburnum.
  †Viburnum
  - †Viburnum tubmanum
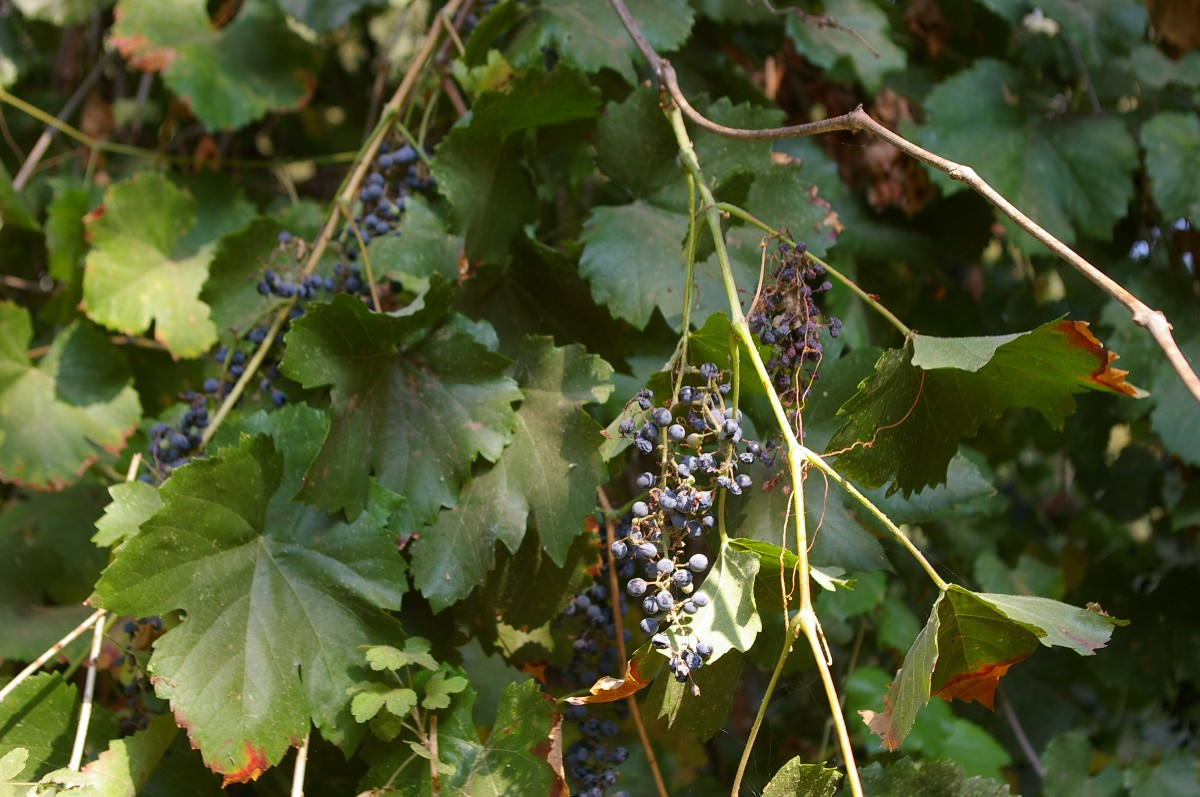
- Leaves and fruit of a living Vitis, or grapevine
  Vitis
  - †Vitis magnisperma
  - †Vitis tiffneyi
- Vulpes
  - †Vulpes stenognathus

== W ==
- †Wheelera
  - †Wheelera lingnicrusta

== X ==
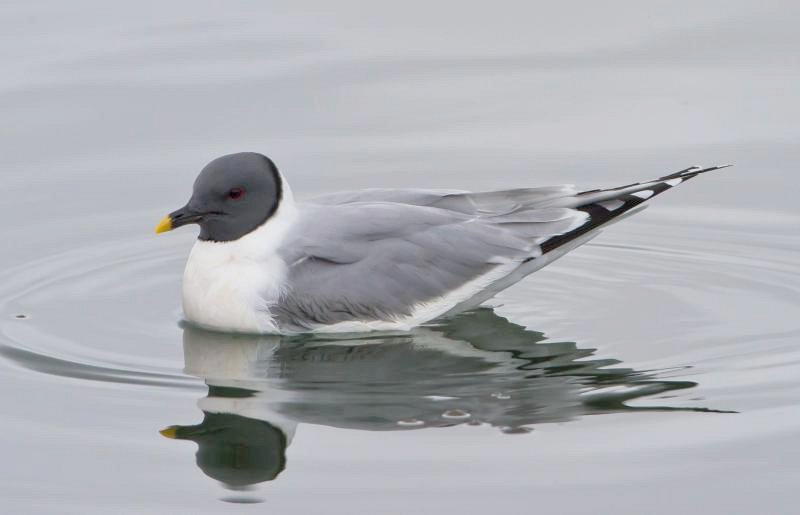
- A living Xema sabini, or Sabine's gull
  Xema
  - †Xema sabinii
- †Xenicohippus
  - †Xenicohippus craspedotum
- †Xylotitan – type locality for genus
  - †Xylotitan cenosus – type locality for species

== Y ==
- †Yaquinacetus – type locality for genus
  - †Yaquinacetus meadi – type locality for species
- Yoldia
  - †Yoldia cooperii – or unidentified comparable form
  - †Yoldia impressa
  - †Yoldia oregona
  - †Yoldia seminuda
  - †Yoldia tenuissima

== Z ==
- Zalophus
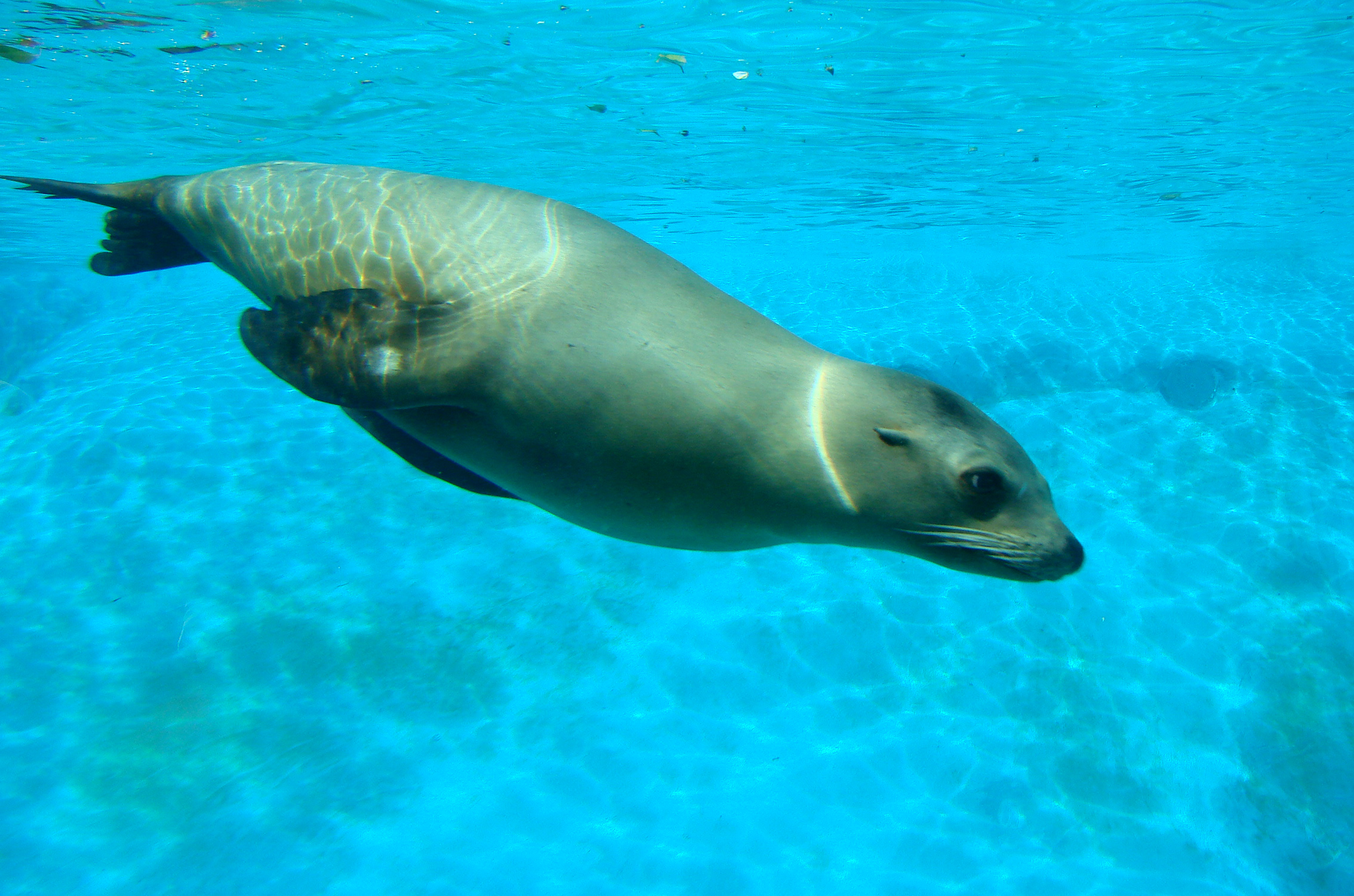
  - A living Zalophus californianus, or California sea lion
    †Zalophus californianus
- †Zanthopsis
  - †Zanthopsis rathbunae – type locality for species
- Zelkova
  - †Zelkova hesperia
  - †Zelkova oregoniana
- †Zingiberopsis
