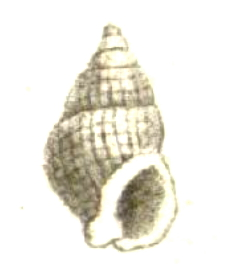
- Drawing of a shell of Caesia perpinguis (holotype)

Scientific classification
- Kingdom: Animalia
- Phylum: Mollusca
- Class: Gastropoda
- Subclass: Caenogastropoda
- Order: Neogastropoda
- Family: Nassariidae
- Genus: Caesia
- Species: C. perpinguis

Binomial name
- Caesia perpinguis (Hinds, 1844)

Synonyms
- Alectrion (Hima) gwatkinianus Melvill, 1918; Alectryon (Hima) gwatkinianus Melvill, 1918 junior subjective synonym; Nassa (Alectrion) corrugata A. Adams, 1852; Nassa corrugata A. Adams, 1852 (junior synonym); † Nassa interstriata Conrad, 1855 junior subjective synonym; Nassa perpinguis Hinds, 1844 (original combination); Nassa perpinguis var. bifasciata S. S. Berry, 1908 (unaccepted combination; variety); Nassa undata Marrat, 1877; Nassarius perpinguis (Hinds, 1844)

= Caesia perpinguis =

Species of gastropod

Caesia perpinguis is a species of snail, a marine gastropod mollusk in the family Nassariidae.

== Description ==
(Described as Nassa interstriata) The ovate-acute shell contains 5½ whorl. These are rounded and cancellated. The longitudinal striae are nodulous, except towards the base of the body whorl. A deep sulcus behind the aperture, two upper whorls are entire. The outer lip is striated within. The spire is conical and is longer than the aperture.

The surface of this shell is roughened by a tubercle on the longitudinal, at each intersection of the revolving lines.

(Described as Nassa perpinguis var. bifasciata) This is a color form of Nassa perpinguis Hinds., which is strikingly distinct and is certainly worthy of a varietal name if color forms must be named. It differs from the ordinary form in the presence of two broad spiral bands of a deep chestnut color in abrupt contrast to the grayish-buff ground color of the shell. One of these bands is situated just below the suture, one about the periphery, and occasionally a fainter band makes it appearance at the extreme base of the body whorl. The bands vary considerably in width, but no specimens having but a single band.

== Distribution ==
This species was found in Magdalena Bay, western coast of Mexico; also in the Persian Gulf.
