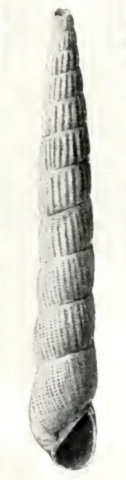
- Drawing of a shell of Turbonilla almejasensis

Scientific classification
- Kingdom: Animalia
- Phylum: Mollusca
- Class: Gastropoda
- Family: Pyramidellidae
- Genus: Turbonilla
- Species: T. almejasensis

Binomial name
- Turbonilla almejasensis Bartsch, 1917

Synonyms
- Turbonilla (Pyrgiscus) almejasensis Bartsch, 1917

= Turbonilla almejasensis =

Species of gastropod

Turbonilla almejasensis is a species of sea snail, a marine gastropod mollusc in the family Pyramidellidae, the pyrams and their allies.

== Description ==
The milk-white shell is slender and has an elongate conic shape. Its length measures 8 mm. The 2½ whorls of the protoconch are well rounded, forming a moderately elevated spire, the axis of which is at right angles to that of the succeeding turns, in the first of which the tilted spire is one-fifth immersed.

The type specimen has 12 or 13 (the first is probably lost) whorls in the teleoconch. The early whorls are flattened, the later ones well rounded. All have the summit feebly shouldered. The whorls are ornamented by very regular well rounded axial ribs which become somewhat enfeebled toward the summit. These ribs have a decided protractive slant on the early whorls, while on the middle turns they are vertical, and on the later volutions they have a decidedly retractive slant. Here, too, they are a little less strong and less regular and much more closely spaced. Of these ribs 18 occur upon the first four of the remaining turns, 20 upon the fifth, 22 upon the sixth, 24 upon the seventh, 28 upon the eighth, 34: upon the ninth, 36 upon the tenth, and about 52 upon the last turn. The intercostal spaces are a little narrower than the ribs. They are marked by 15 fairly equal and equally spaced spiral series of pits, which are about as wide as the spaces that separate them. Of these pits the first is about one-twelfth the distance between the first basal line and the peripheral series of pits anterior to the summit. On the body whorl, where the axial ribs become decidedly enfeebled, the combination of the axial and raised spiral sculpture gives to the surface a thimble pitted appearance. The suture of the early whorls is slightly and of the later strongly constricted. The periphery of the body whorl is well rounded. The base of the shell is attenuated. It is marked by the very feeble continuations of the axial ribs, and 12 incised spiral lines, which are of irregular strength and spacing. The aperture is broadly oval. The posterior angle is acute. The outer lip is thin. The inner lip is slightly curved, decidedly oblique, revolute, and appressed to the attenuated base for almost its entire length. It is provided with a strong very oblique fold at its insertion. The parietal wall is covered by a very thick callus.

== Distribution ==
The type specimen of this marine species was found off Magdalena Bay, Baja California Sur.
