= Puerto Cortés, Baja California Sur =

Puerto Cortés
- Location within Baja California Sur Location within Mexico
- Coordinates: 24°28′40″N 111°49′19″W
- Country: Mexico
- State: Baja California Sur
- Municipality: Comondú
- Elevation: 0 ft (0 m)

Population (2010)
  - City: 0
  - Urban: 0
- Time zone: UTC-7 (Pacific)

Puerto Cortés is a small settlement on Isla Santa Margarita, off the Pacific coast of the Mexican state of Baja California Sur. It is part of the municipality of Comondú. There is a naval base there. It is sometimes used as a breakpoint in meteorological reports. The 2010 census reported no official resident population.

Juan Suby, a member of the Mexican Professional Baseball Hall of Fame, was born in Puerto Cortés.

== See also ==
- Puerto Cortés Airstrip
