= Mangelia pulchrior =

Scientific classification
- Kingdom: Animalia
- Phylum: Mollusca
- Class: Gastropoda
- Subclass: Caenogastropoda
- Order: Neogastropoda
- Superfamily: Conoidea
- Family: Mangeliidae
- Genus: Mangelia
- Species: M. pulchrior

Binomial name
- Mangelia pulchrior (W. H. Dall, 1921)

Synonyms
- Mangilia pulchrior Dall, 1921; Perimangelia variegata nitens Carpenter, P.P., 1864 (preoccupied)

Species of gastropod

Mangelia pulchrior is a species of sea snail, a marine gastropod mollusk in the family Mangeliidae.

== Distribution ==
This species occurs in the Pacific Ocean from Monterey, California, to Magdalena Bay, Baja California Sur.
