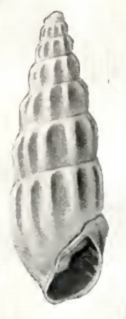
- Drawing of a shell of Turbonilla juani

Scientific classification
- Kingdom: Animalia
- Phylum: Mollusca
- Class: Gastropoda
- Family: Pyramidellidae
- Genus: Turbonilla
- Species: T. juani

Binomial name
- Turbonilla juani Bartsch, 1917

Synonyms
- Turbonilla (Ugartea) juani Bartsch, 1917

= Turbonilla juani =

Species of gastropod

Turbonilla juani is a species of sea snail, a marine gastropod mollusk in the family Pyramidellidae, the pyrams and their allies.

== Description ==
The bluish-white shell has a broadly elongate conic shape. Its length measures 4.2 mm. There are at least two whorls in the protoconch. These are planorboid and have their axis almost at right angles to that of the succeeding turns, in the first of which they are about half immersed. The seven whorls of the teleoconch are appressed at the summit with a strong sloping shoulder, which extends over the posterior fourth of the space between the summit and the suture, the rest is flattened. They are marked by strong, rounded, distantly spaced, almost vertical, axial ribs of which 14 occur upon the first and 12 upon all the remaining, excepting the last, which has 14. The ribs form cusps at the anterior angle of the shoulder, anterior to which they become enfeebled. The intercostal spaces are shallow, about 2| times as wide as the ribs. They are marked by closely spaced microscopic spiral striations only. Immediately behind the aperture on the last turn, the ribs become obsolete. The suture is moderately impressed. The periphery of the body whorl is rounded. The base of the shell is prolonged. It is marked by the continuation of the axial ribs, which become evanescent before reaching the middle. The aperture is narrowly oval. The posterior angle is acute;. The outer lip is thick within. It is provided with three lamellar denticles on the inner surface. The inner lip is short, strong decidedly revolute continuing posteriorly into the very strong parietal callus, which becomes disjunct from the preceding whorl at the outer edge, which renders the peritreme complete. The inner lip is provided with a strong oblique fold at its insertion, while the parietal wall bears a short fold about halfway between this and the posterior angle of the aperture. This fold on the parietal wall is characteristic for this species.

== Distribution ==
The type specimen was found in the Pacific Ocean off Magdalena Bay, Baja California Sur.
