= Odostomia era =

Scientific classification
- Kingdom: Animalia
- Phylum: Mollusca
- Class: Gastropoda
- Family: Pyramidellidae
- Genus: Odostomia
- Species: O. era

Binomial name
- Odostomia era Bartsch, 1927

Synonyms
- Odostomia (Chrysallida) era Bartsch, 1927 (basionym)

Species of gastropod

Odostomia era is a species of sea snail, a marine gastropod mollusc in the family Pyramidellidae, the pyrams and their allies.

== Distribution ==
This species occurs in the Pacific Ocean off Magdalena Bay, Baja California Sur.
