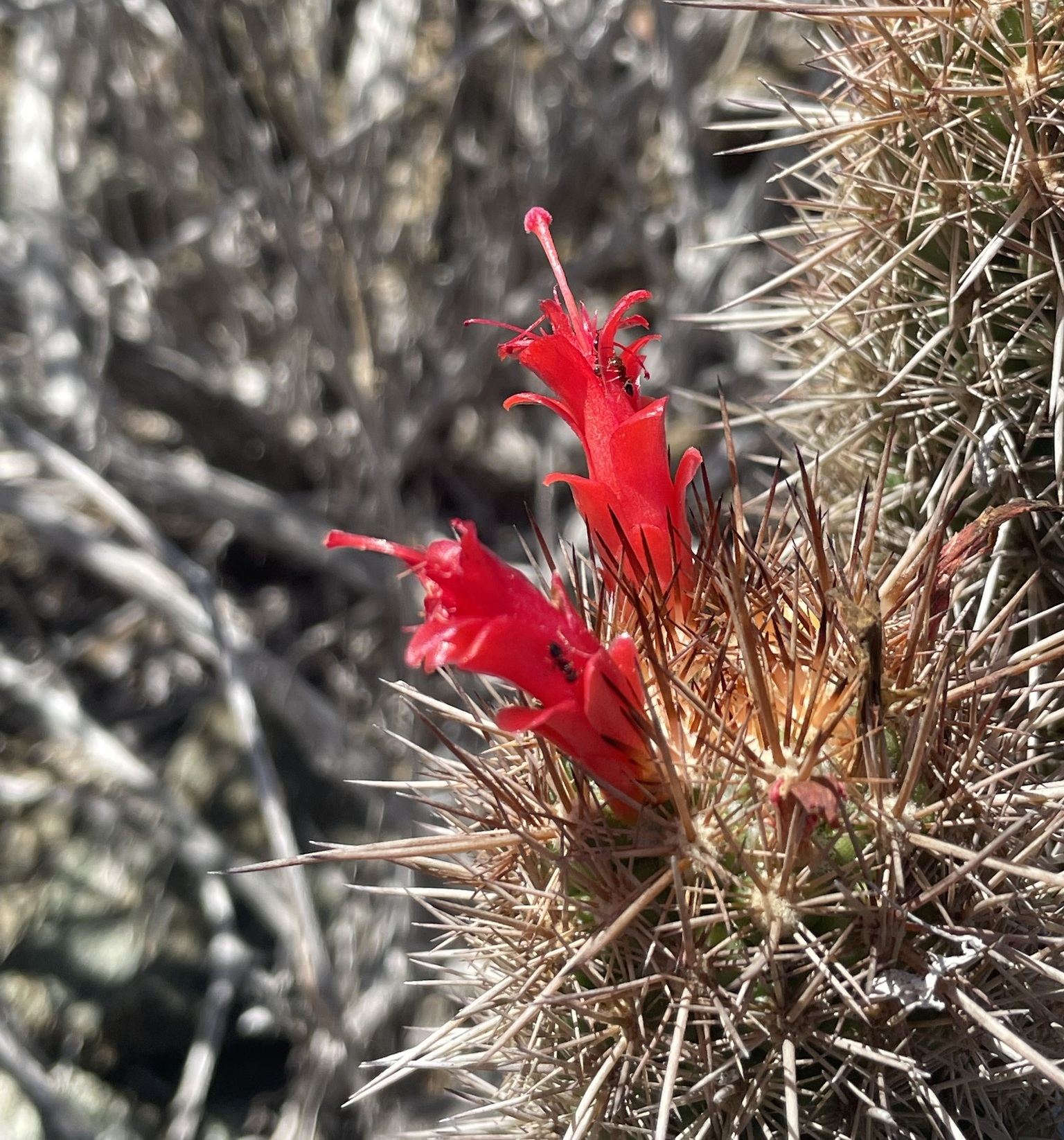
- Flowering in habitat

Conservation status
- Vulnerable (IUCN 3.1)

Scientific classification
- Kingdom: Plantae
- Clade: Tracheophytes
- Clade: Angiosperms
- Clade: Eudicots
- Order: Caryophyllales
- Family: Cactaceae
- Subfamily: Cactoideae
- Genus: Cochemiea
- Species: C. halei

Binomial name
- Cochemiea halei (Brandegee) Walton

Synonyms
- Cactus halei (Brandegee) J.M.Coult. 1894; Mammillaria halei Brandegee 1889

= Cochemiea halei =

Species of cactus

Cochemiea halei is a species of cactus in the genus Cochemiea commonly known as the Magdalena cochemiea. It is endemic to the Magdalena Bay region in the Mexican state of Baja California Sur.

== Description ==
Cochemiea halei forms large clusters up to 2 m (6 ft 7 in) in size. Individual shoots are cylindrical, 30–40 cm (12–16 in) long, and 5–7.5 cm (2.0–3.0 in) in diameter. The warts are short, and the axillae are woolly. It has 6-9 stiff, strong, reddish-brown central spines 2.0–2.5 cm (0.79–0.98 in) long that turn gray with age. The 15-22 radial spines are initially reddish-brown and gray, 0.9–1.5 cm (0.35–0.59 in) long.

The red flowers are vertical with a crooked-hemmed and 3.5–5 cm (1.4–2.0 in) long with a long flower tube. The fruits are club-shaped, red, and up to 1.2 cm (0.47 in) long. Seeds are reticulated.

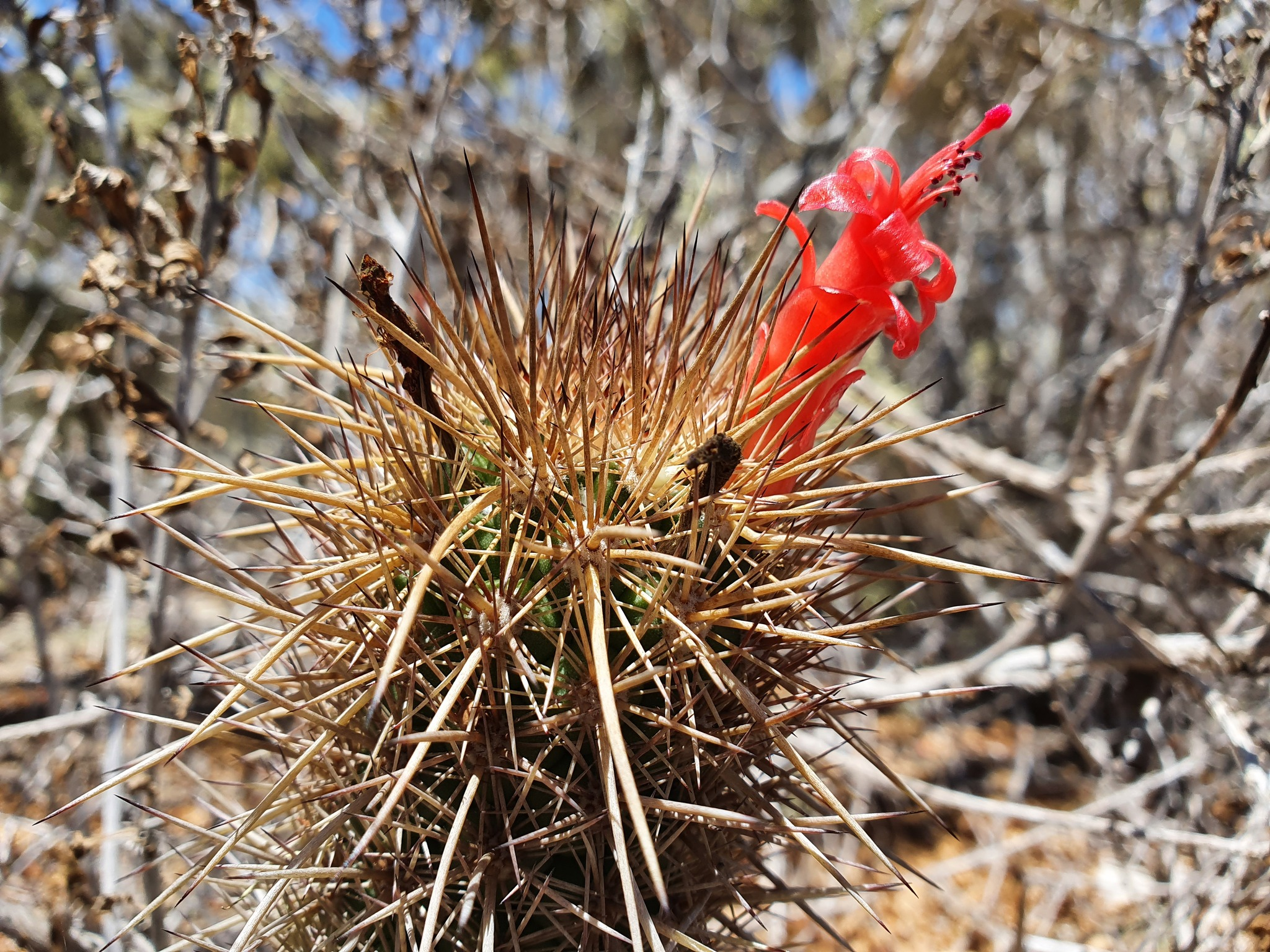
Flower

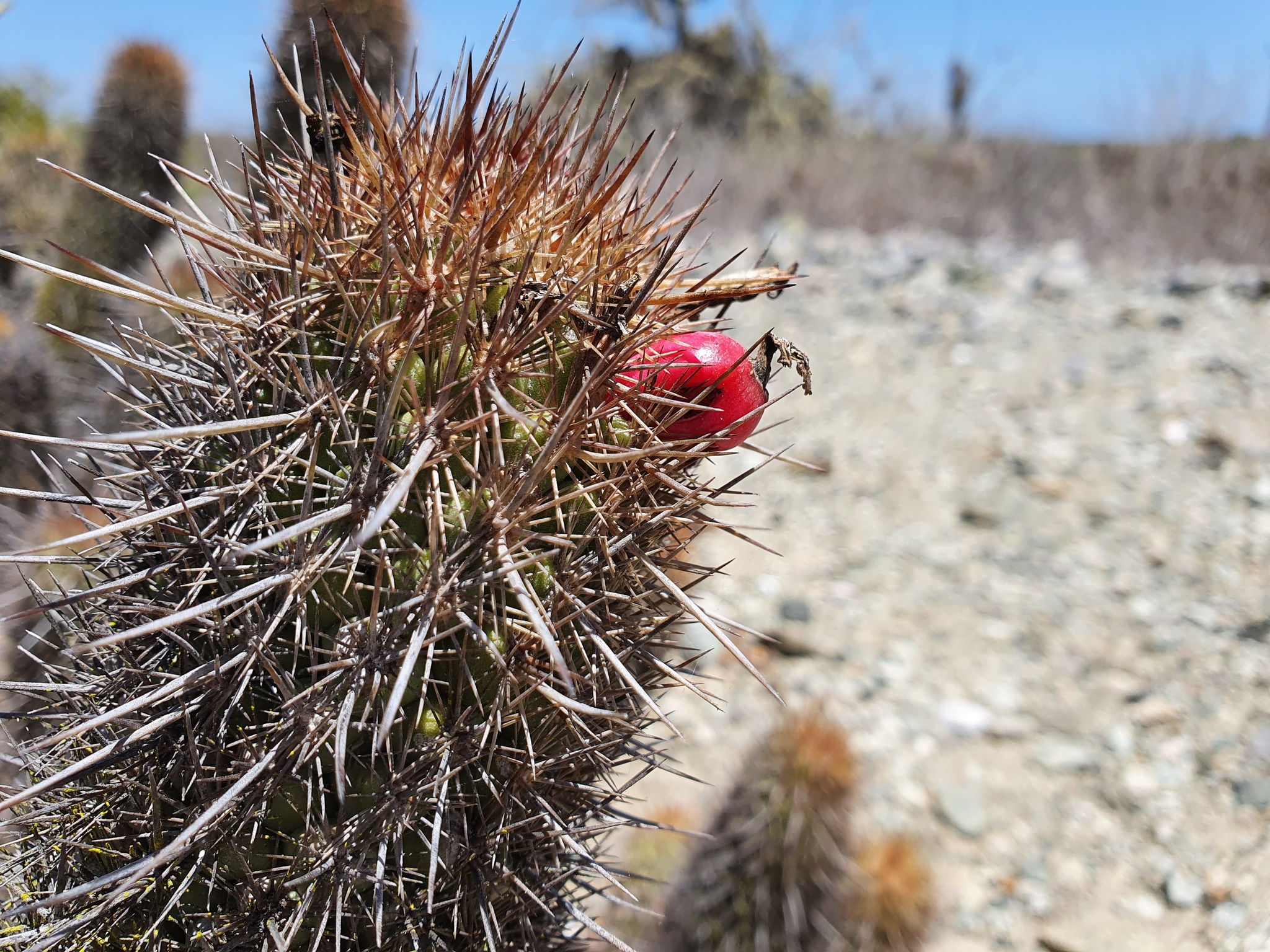
Fruit

== Distribution ==
Cochemiea halei is found in Baja California Sur, Mexico, specifically on the islands of Magdalena and Santa Margarita at elevations of 10 to 100 meters. It grows on sand dunes on the beach along with Echinocereus barthelowianus, Opuntia pycnantha, Cochemiea dioica, and Stenocereus eruca. It is also rarely found in a few adjacent mainland localities.

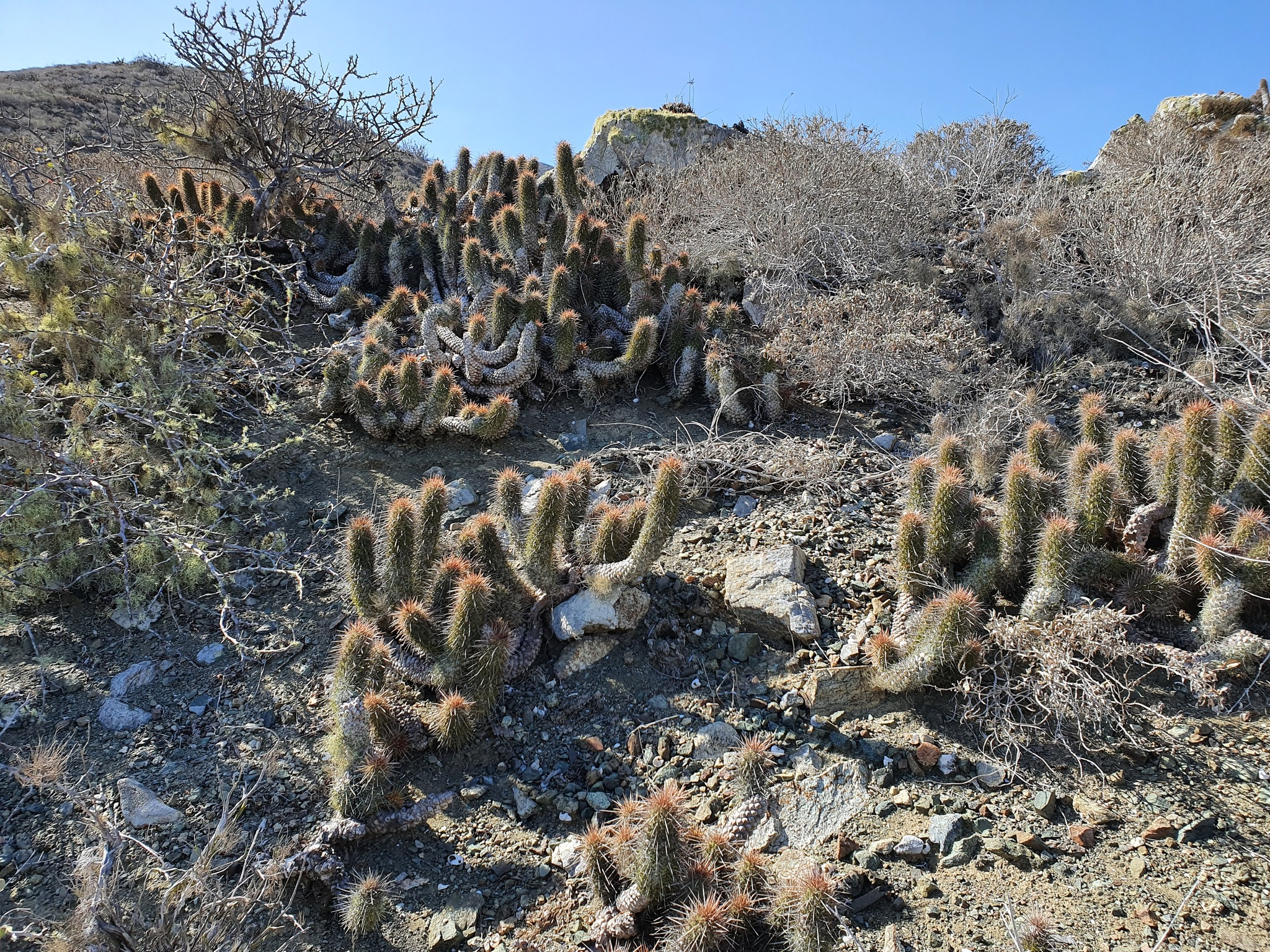
Several plants on Magdalena Island

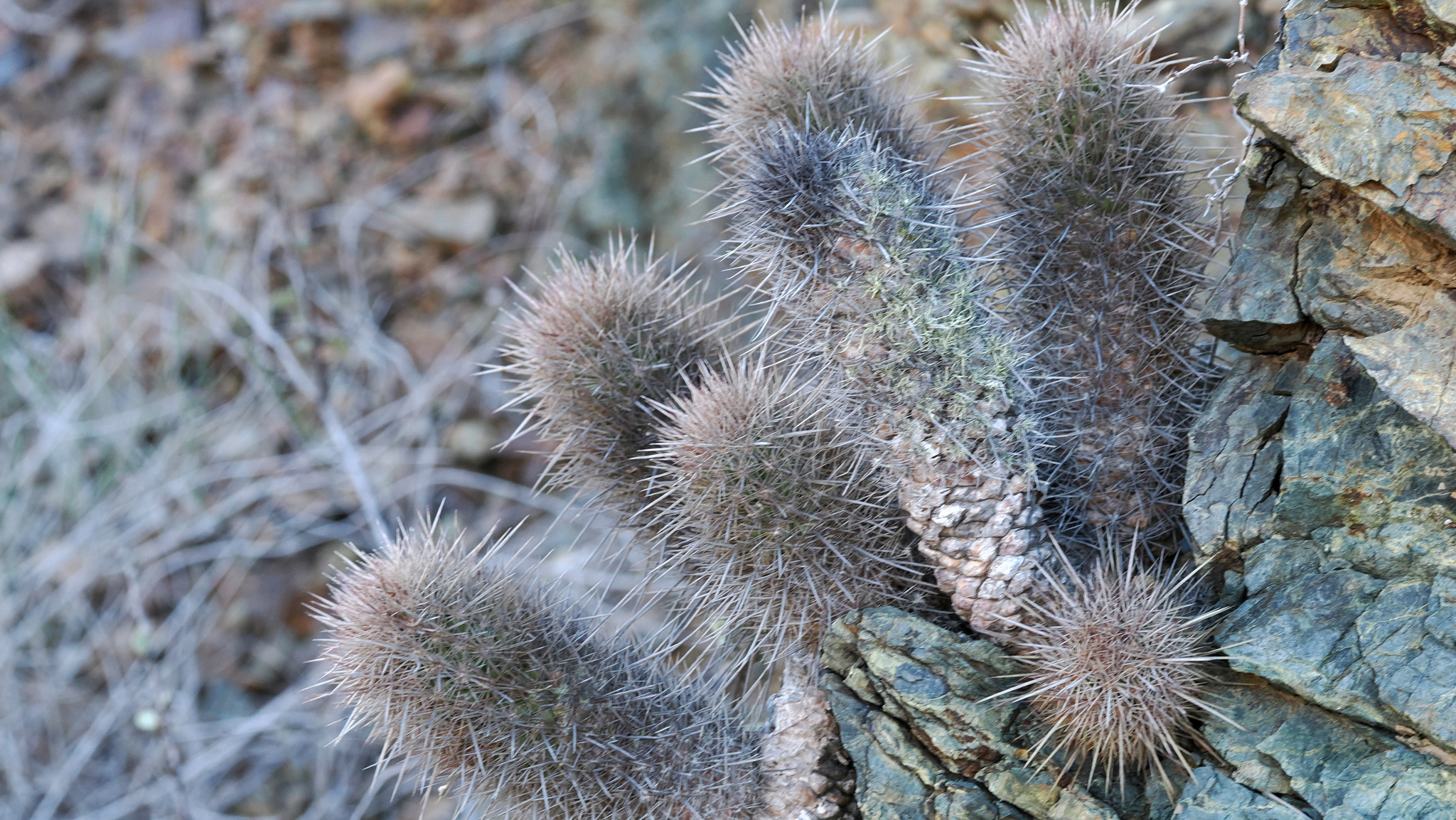
Plants growing in habitat San Carlos, Baja California Sur, Mexico

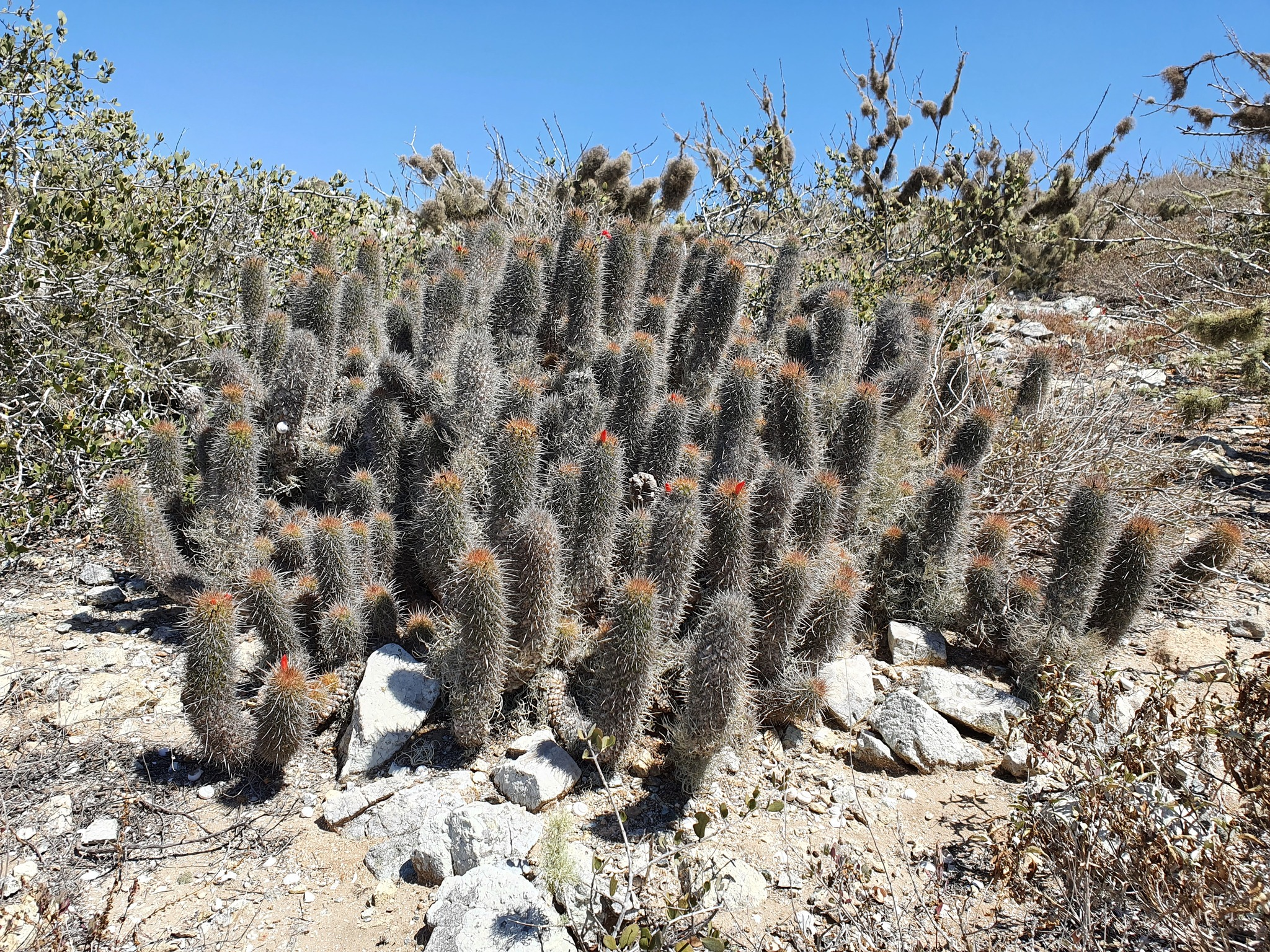
Habitat growing in San Carlos, Baja California Sur, Mexico

== Taxonomy ==
First described as Mammillaria halei in 1889 by American botanist Townshend Stith Brandegee, the specific epithet honors J.P. Hale, a landowner in Baja California who supported Brandegee's expedition. Frederick Arthur Walton reclassified the species to the genus Cochemiea in 1899.
