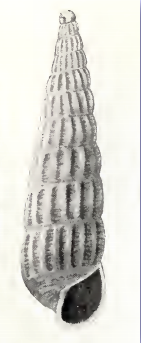
- Drawing of a shell of Turbonilla cabrilloi

Scientific classification
- Kingdom: Animalia
- Phylum: Mollusca
- Class: Gastropoda
- Family: Pyramidellidae
- Genus: Turbonilla
- Species: T. cabrilloi

Binomial name
- Turbonilla cabrilloi Bartsch, 1917

Synonyms
- Turbonilla (Pyrgiscus) cabrilloi Bartsch, 1917

= Turbonilla cabrilloi =

Species of gastropod

Turbonilla cabrilloi is a species of sea snail, a marine gastropod mollusk in the family Pyramidellidae, the pyrams and their allies.

== Description ==
The pale yellow horn-colored shell has a broadly elongate conic shape. Its length measures 5.5 mm. The 2½ whorls of the protoconch are well rounded. They form a decidedly depressed helicoid spire having its axis at right angles to that of the succeeding whorls, in the first of which, the tilted edge is about one-fourth immersed. The 9¼ whorls of the teleoconch are strongly roundly shouldered at the summit, and flattened in the middle. They are crossed by strong sublamellar, slightly protractively slanting axial ribs, of which 16 occur upon the first and second and 18 upon the remaining turns, excepting the last, which has 20. The intercostal spaces are about one and one-half times as wide as the ribs. They are crossed by 11 incised spiral lines, of which the first three are mere striations, while the fourth and the peripheral are wider than the rest, which are about half their width. The suture rather strongly constricted. The periphery of the body whorl is well rounded. The base of the shell is short and narrowly umbilicated. It is marked by the feeble continuations of the axial ribs, which become evanescent before reaching the middle of the base and seven equal incised spiral lines, of which the first three occupy about as much space as that separating the third from the fourth; the rest become successively closer spaced anteriorly. The space between the first basal line and the peripheral pit is a very broad smooth band. The aperture is very broadly oval. The posterior angle is acute. The outer lip is thin, showing the external sculpture within. The inner lip is thin, slightly curved and somewhat revolute. It is provided with a weak oblique fold at its insertion. The parietal wall is covered with a thick callus.

== Distribution ==
The type specimen of this marine species was found off Magdalena Bay, Baja California Sur.
