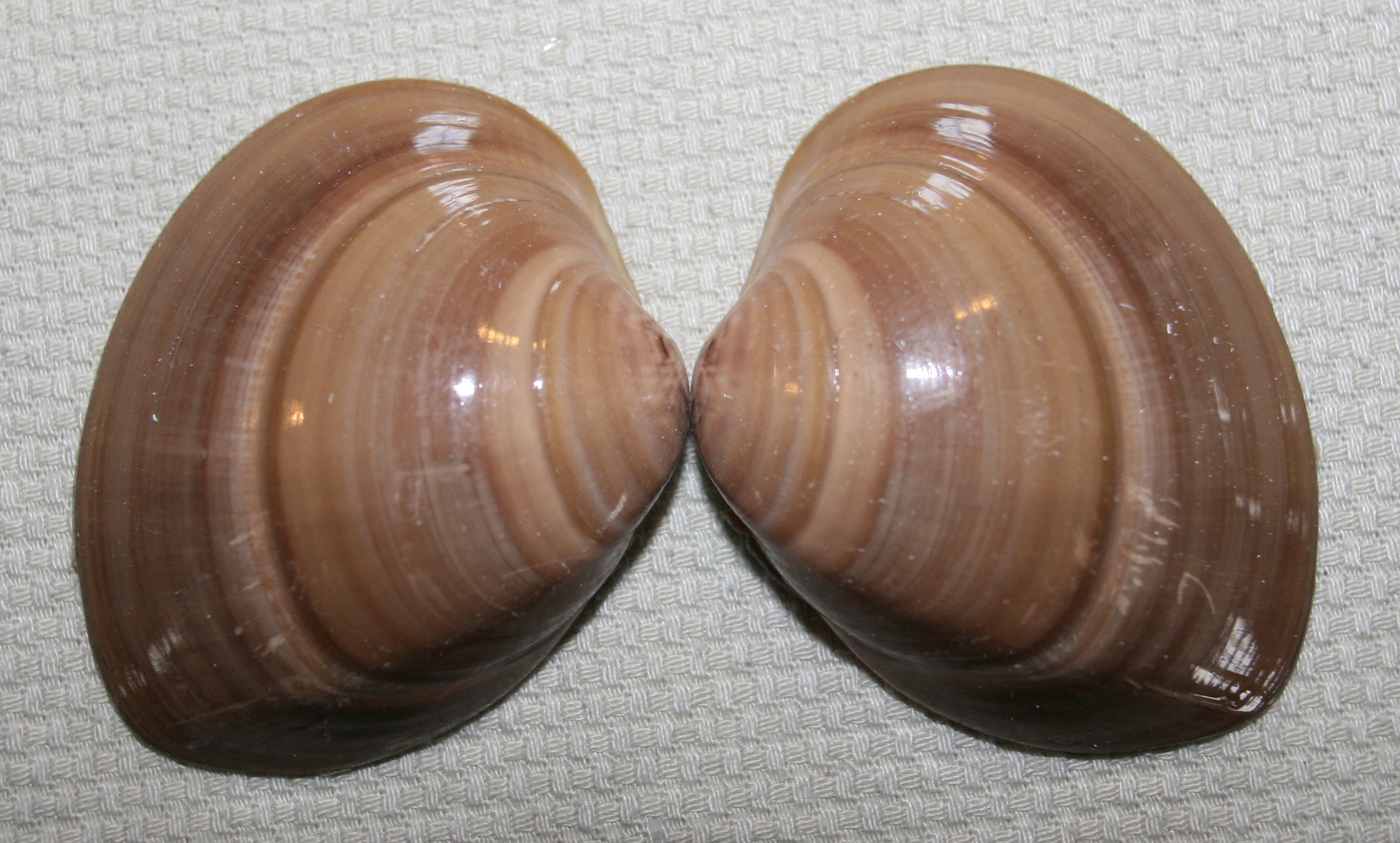

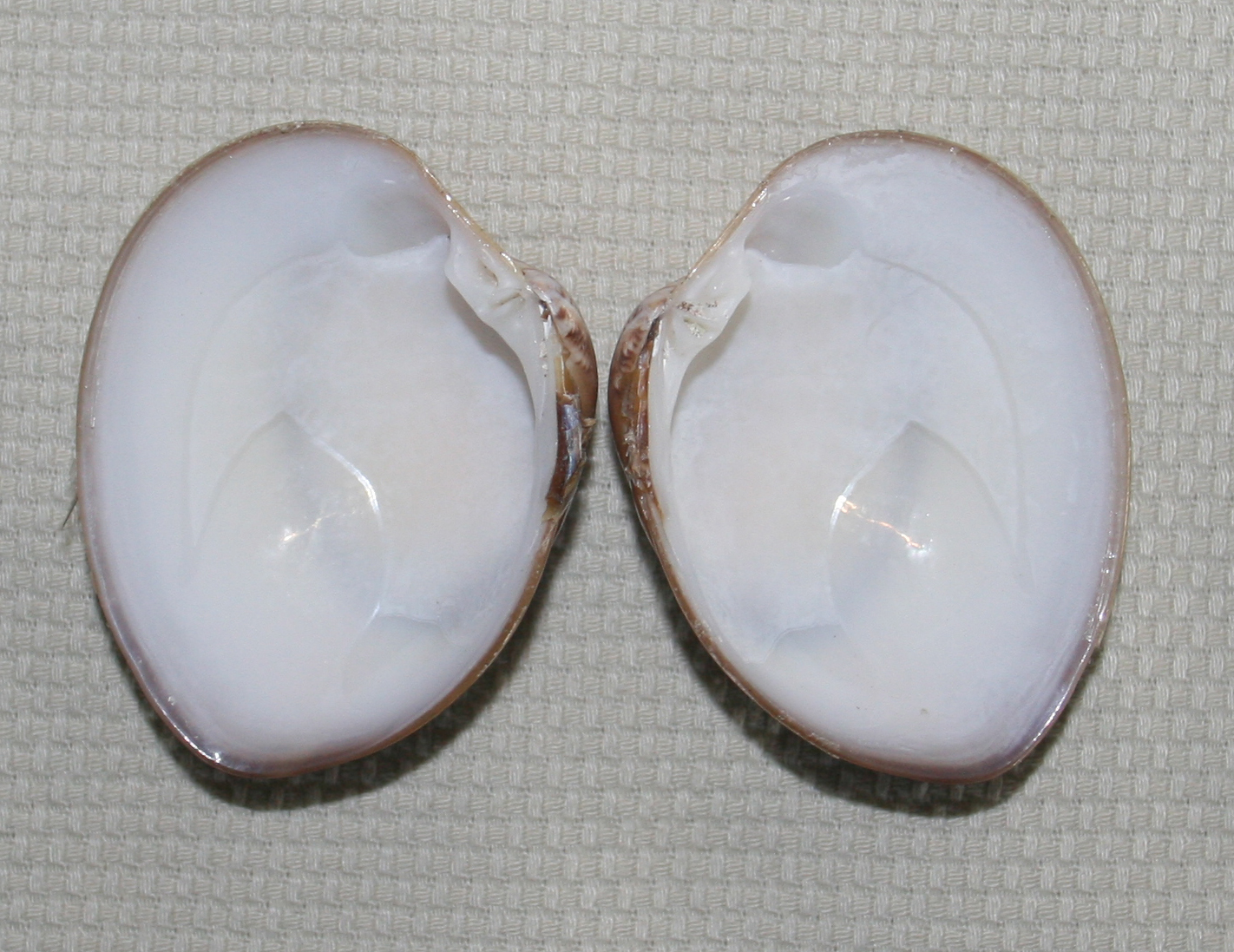

Scientific classification
- Kingdom: Animalia
- Phylum: Mollusca
- Class: Bivalvia
- Order: Venerida
- Superfamily: Veneroidea
- Family: Veneridae
- Genus: Megapitaria
- Species: M. squalida

Binomial name
- Megapitaria squalida (G. B. Sowerby I, 1835)

Synonyms
- Callista squalida (G. B. Sowerby I, 1835); Cytherea biradiata G. B. Sowerby I, 1839; Cytherea chionaea Menke, 1847; Cytherea squalida G. B. Sowerby I, 1835; Macrocallista orcutti Dall, 1918; Venus (Cytherea) guttata Romer, 1866

= Megapitaria squalida =

Megapitaria squalida Temporal range: Upper Pliocene–Recent, 3.6–0 Ma

Species of bivalve

Megapitaria squalida, the chocolate clam, is a species of bivalve mollusc in the family Veneridae. It was first described to science by George Brettingham Sowerby, a British conchologist, in 1835. The type specimen was collected by Hugh Cuming. Fossil evidence suggests that this species may be as old as 3.6 million years.

== Description ==
The valves are thick and of equal size. In life, the valves are covered by a grayish-brown periostracum. The external surface of the shell is smooth. It is tan to brown in color, sometimes with bands or speckles of different intensity. The interior of the shell is white, sometimes with bands of purple. The shell can reach 120 millimetres (4.7 in) long, 97 millimetres (3.8 in) wide, and 68 millimetres (2.7 in) deep. Weight may reach 93 grams (3.3 oz) for live individuals.

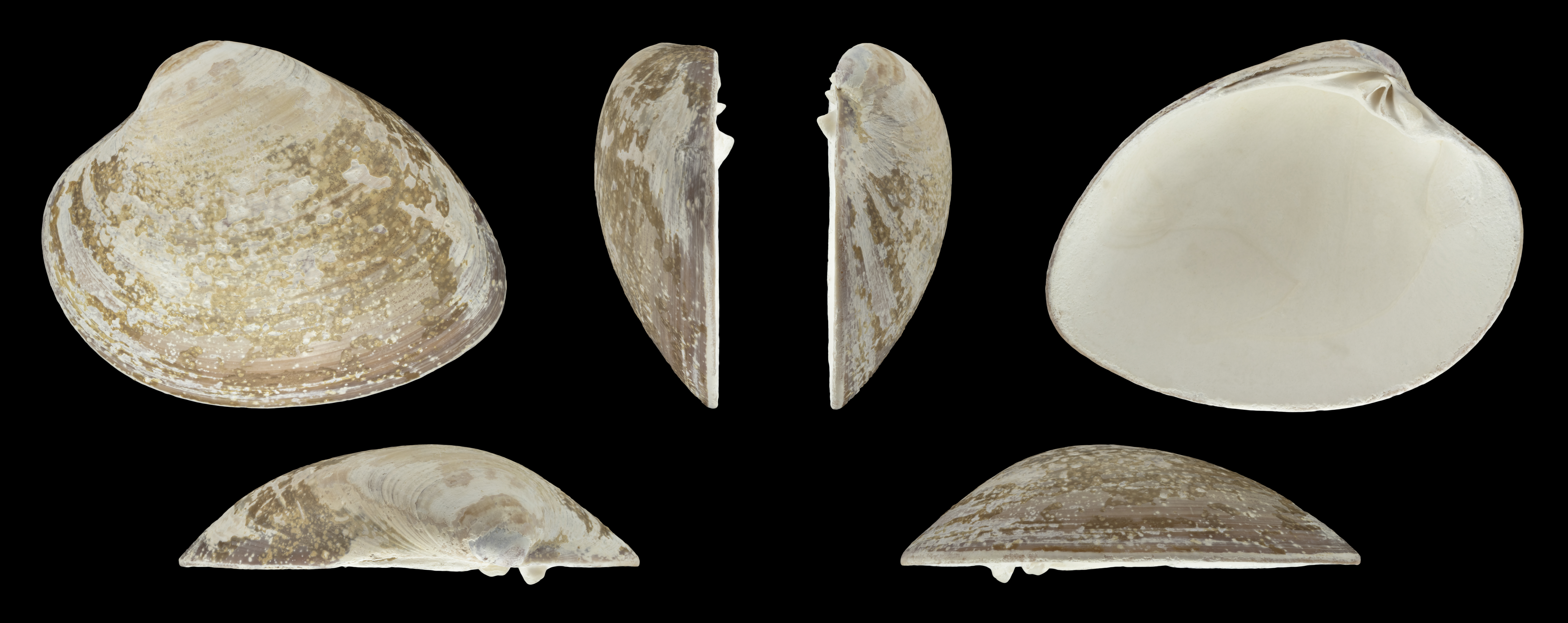
Left valve

== Range and habitat ==
Chocolate clams are found in the eastern Pacific Ocean from Ojo de Liebre Lagoon in Baja California south to Mancora, Peru, and in the Gulf of California. This species is also found in the Galapagos Islands. These clams live buried in sandy sediments from the intertidal zone to 160 metres (520 ft) deep. In a study performed in Magdelena Bay, the average density was 2.01 individuals per square meter. Larger clams are found in deeper water.

== Life history ==
Megapitaria squalida is gonochoric, which is to say that there are two sexes, and individuals are either male or female. Some populations show significantly higher numbers of females than males. Hermaphrodites, individuals containing both types of sex organs, are present, and even common in some populations. One study suggests that differing sex ratios and the amount of hermaphroditism in various populations may be the result of fishing pressures.

Megapitaria squalida reproduces by broadcast spawning. Spawning occurs all year, with seasonal peaks. Oocytes measure between 34.6 micrometres (0.00136 in) and 41.9 micrometres (0.00165 in). Females were observed to contain as many as 1,214 oocytes at any one time.

Chocolate clams are filter feeders. They extend their siphons up through the sand to suck in and expel sea water. They strain out nutrients from the incoming flow and then expel waste products with the outgoing flow.

Chocolate clams can live as long as ten years, while the mode in populations that have been studied is four years.

== Human consumption ==
There are both commercial and recreational harvests of chocolate clams. They are collected by hand on the beach at low tide, by free divers, and by scuba and hookah-equipped divers. The commercial harvest in Mexico grew from 125 metric tons in 1985, to 1,400 metric tons in 2006, and to 4,272 metric tons in 2014. Mexican fishery regulations require chocolate clams to exceed 80 millimetres (3.1 in) in length before they can be harvested.

Chocolate clams are eaten marinated on the half-shell, as ceviche, in chowders, baked, steamed, and in salads.

Chocolate clams are filter feeders and can concentrate heavy metals from the environment. The concentration of heavy metals in clam meat varies by season. Similarly, these animals can sometimes concentrate the neurotoxins of paralytic shellfish poisoning.

Chocolate clams are not actively marketed in the United States. They do not appear on the U.S. Food and Drug Administration's Seafood List.
