= Caesia (gastropod) =

Scientific classification
- Kingdom: Animalia
- Phylum: Mollusca
- Class: Gastropoda
- Subclass: Caenogastropoda
- Order: Neogastropoda
- Family: Nassariidae
- Genus: Caesia; H. Adams & A. Adams, 1853

Type species
- Nassa perpinguis Hinds, 1844

Synonyms
- Buccinum (Caesia) H. Adams & A. Adams, 1882; Nassa (Caesia) H. Adams & A. Adams, 1853; Nassa (Zaphon) H. Adams & A. Adams, 1853; Nassarius (Caesia) H. Adams & A. Adams, 1853; Nassarius (Demondia) Addicott, 1956 †; Nassarius (Schizopyga) Conrad, 1856 †; Nassarius (Zaphon) H. Adams & A. Adams, 1853; Schizopyga Conrad, 1856 ·

Genus of gastropods

Caesia is a genus of sea snails in the subfamily Nassariinae of the family Nassariidae.

== Description ==
(Described as Zaphon) The shell is bucciniform. The spire is elevated, the whorls rugose. The inner lip shows a spreading, corrugated callus. The outer lip is denticulate, lirate internally, not variced externally.

== Species ==
- Caesia delosi (Woodring, 1946)
- Caesia fossata (A. Gould, 1850)
- Caesia perpinguis (Hinds, 1844)
- Caesia rhinetes (S. S. Berry, 1953)

Synonyms

- Caesia japonica (A. Adams, 1852): synonym of Nassarius praematuratus (Kuroda & Habe in Habe, 1960)
