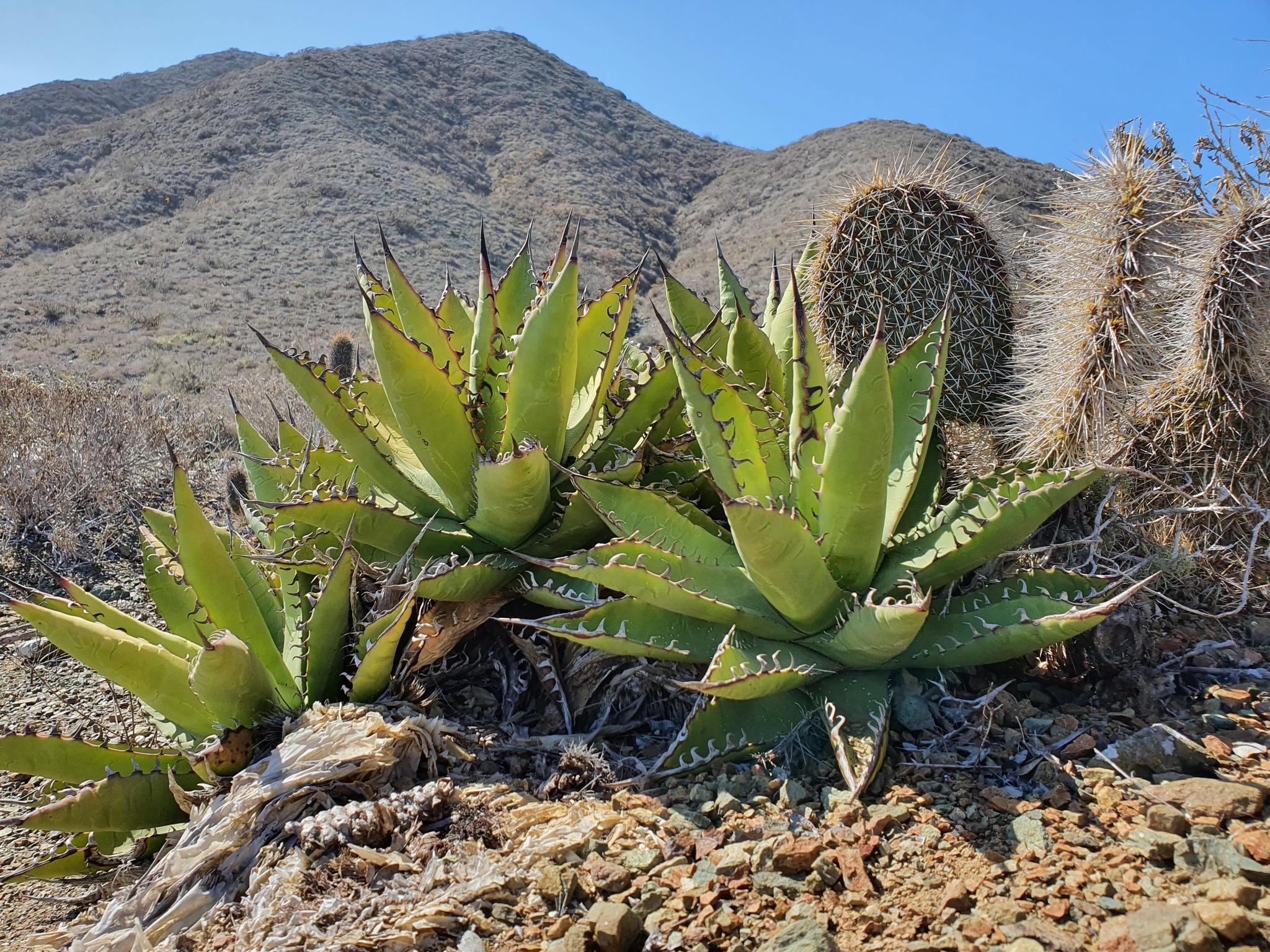
- Agave margaritae on Isla Magdalena

Conservation status
- Least Concern (IUCN 3.1)

Scientific classification
- Kingdom: Plantae
- Clade: Tracheophytes
- Clade: Angiosperms
- Clade: Monocots
- Order: Asparagales
- Family: Asparagaceae
- Subfamily: Agavoideae
- Genus: Agave
- Species: A. margaritae

Binomial name
- Agave margaritae (Brandegee, 1889)

Synonyms
- Agave connochaetodon Trel.

= Agave margaritae =

Species of flowering plant

Agave margaritae is a species of monocarpic succulent plant in the genus Agave commonly known as the Santa Margarita agave. It is endemic to the islands of Santa Margarita and Magdalena in the Magdalena Bay in Baja California Sur, Mexico.

== Description ==
Agave margaritae has small rosettes, that are formed in sparse offshoots. Its pointed leaves have oval to wide lancets and are thick, fleshy, variably arranged, bright-yellow/green colored, 10 to 25 cm long and 7 to 10 cm wide. The leaf edges are variably serrated and form a brown horny edge. The colors of the tips range from brown to grey and are two to three cm long.

The panicles inflorescence are two to three and a half meters high. The bright-yellow flowers are 45 to 50 mm long and appear on the upper half of the inflorescence in loose, variably arranged branches. The flower tube is 14 to 10 mm long. The blooming period is from June to July.

The elongated three-chamber capsules are three to five cm long and 1.5 to two cm wide. The black, variably formed seeds are four to five mm long and .5 mm thick.

=== Taxonomy ===
The species description was published in 1889 by Townshend Stith Brandegee. A synonym of this species is Agave connochaetoden Trel. Agave margaritae is a representative of the genus Agave. It is differentiated through leaf and flower structure characteristics. The species is related to Agave vizcainoensis.

== Distribution ==
The plant is endemic to Baja California Sur state in northwestern Mexico. It is endemic to Magdelena Island (type locality) and Isla Santa Margarita in the Magdalena Bay on the Pacific coast of the state. It is associated with Echinocereus barthelowanus.
