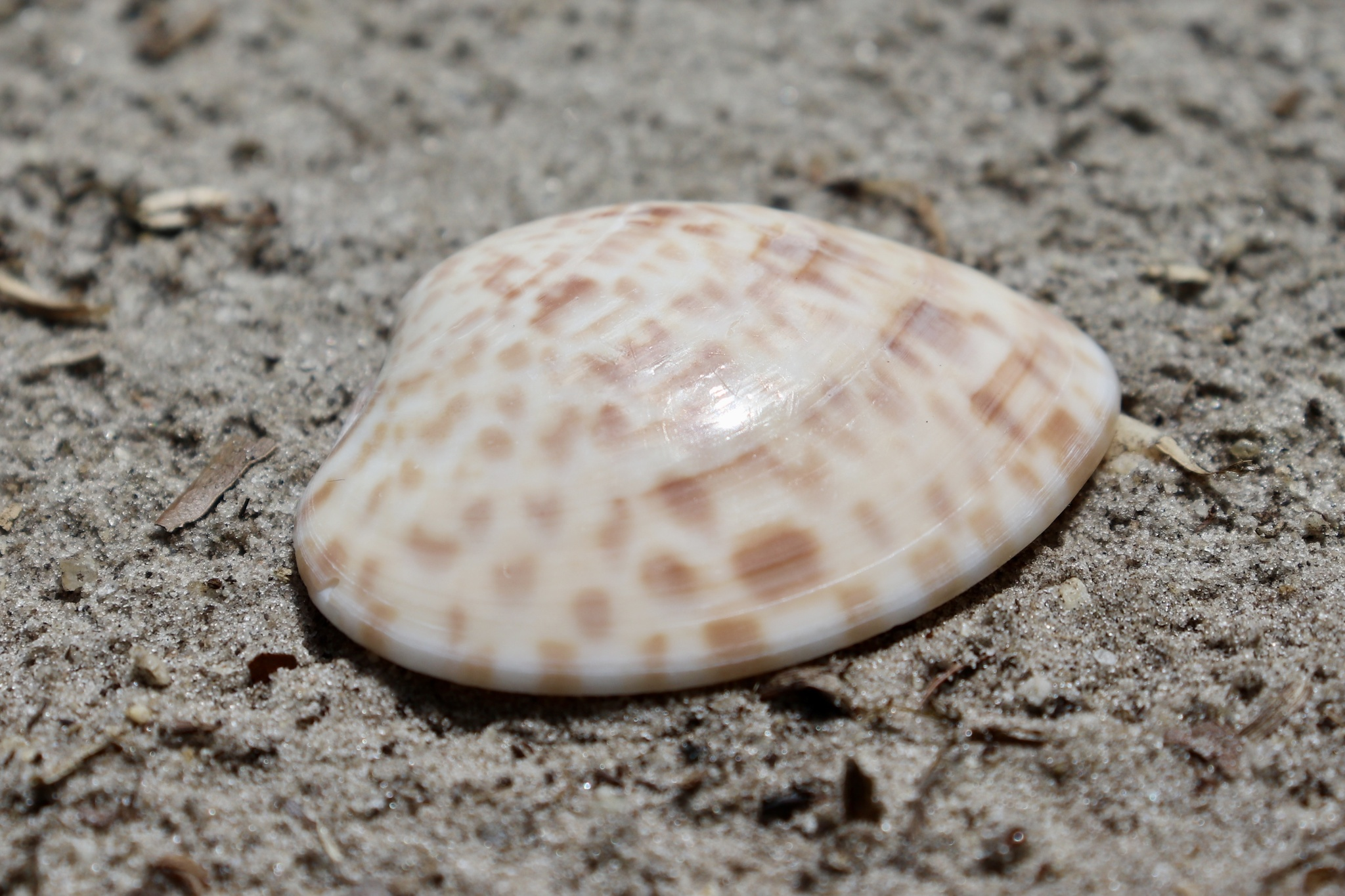
- Megapitaria maculata

Scientific classification
- Domain: Eukaryota
- Kingdom: Animalia
- Phylum: Mollusca
- Class: Bivalvia
- Order: Venerida
- Family: Veneridae
- Genus: Megapitaria; Grant & Gale, 1931

= Megapitaria =

Genus of bivalves

Megapitaria is a genus of bivalves belonging to the family Veneridae.

The species of this genus are found in America.

Species:

- Megapitaria aurantiaca (Sowerby I, 1831)
- Megapitaria maculata (Linnaeus, 1758)
- Megapitaria squalida (Sowerby I, 1835)
