= Puerto Cortés Airstrip =

- IATA: none; ICAO: none; LID: PTC

Summary
- Airport type: Military
- Operator: Secretaría de Marina
- Location: Puerto Cortés, BCS
- Elevation AMSL: 6 ft / 2 m
- Coordinates: 24°28′30″N 111°49′33″W
- Interactive map of Puerto Cortés Airstrip

Runways
Direction	Length		Surface
Direction	ft	m	Surface
16/34	2,787	849	Soil

Puerto Cortés Airstrip is the military dirt airstrip of Puerto Cortés Naval Base, located on the East side of Isla Santa Margarita, on the coast of Magdalena Bay, in the Mexican state of Baja California Sur. Isla Margarita is a Pacific Ocean island, located to the West of the Baja California Peninsula, and belongs politically to the municipality of Comondú. Puerto Cortés Naval Base is handled by the Mexican Navy and is the center of a Military Naval Sector that depends from the 2nd Military Naval Region in Ensenada, BC. The airstrip is used solely for military aviation purposes.
