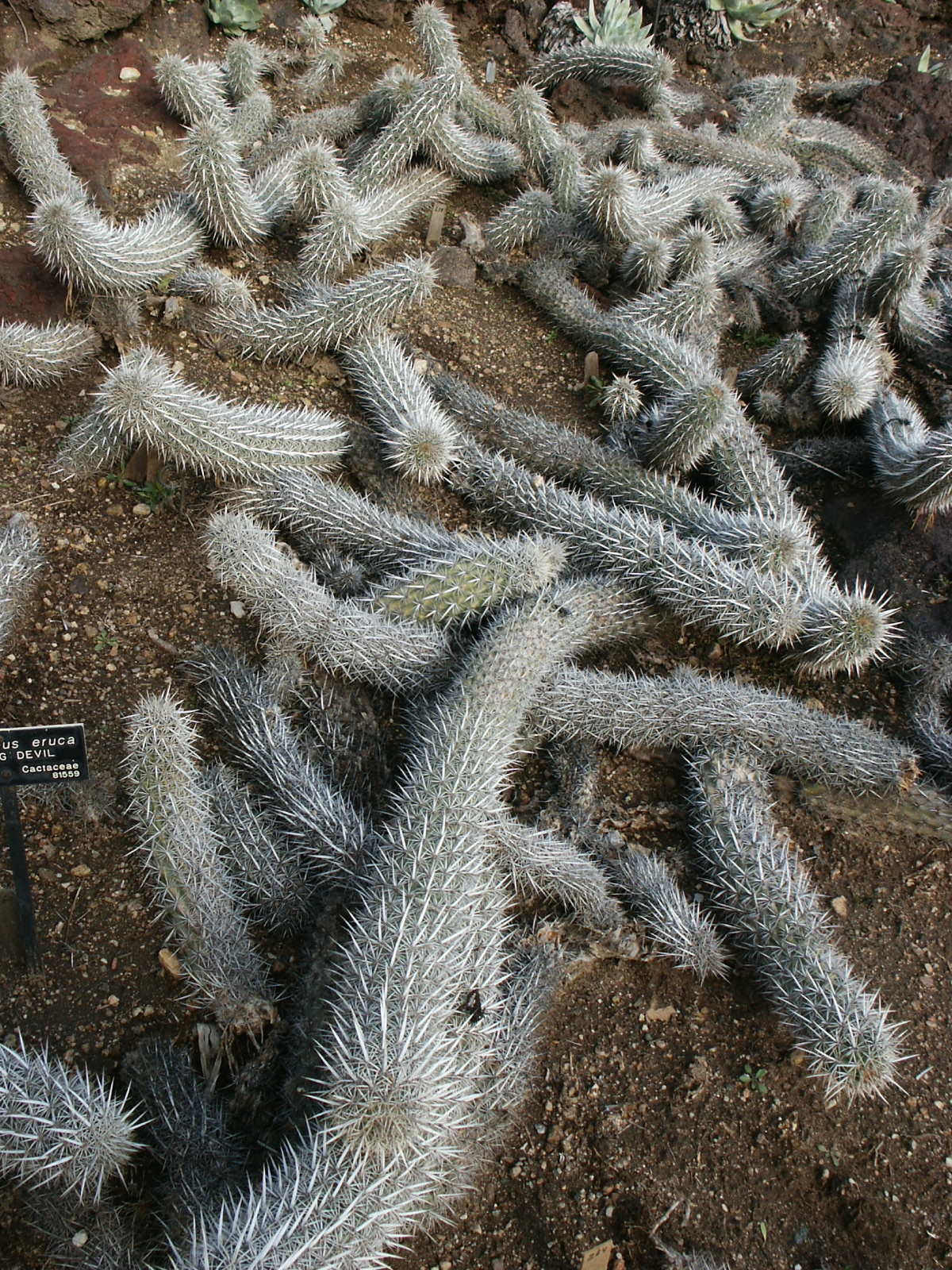

Conservation status
- Least Concern (IUCN 2.3)

Scientific classification
- Kingdom: Plantae
- Clade: Tracheophytes
- Clade: Angiosperms
- Clade: Eudicots
- Order: Caryophyllales
- Family: Cactaceae
- Subfamily: Cactoideae
- Genus: Stenocereus
- Species: S. eruca

Binomial name
- Stenocereus eruca (Brandg.) Gibson & Horak

Synonyms
- Cereus eruca Brandegee 1889; Machaerocereus eruca (Brandegee) Britton & Rose 1920; Rathbunia eruca (Brandegee) P.V.Heath 1992; Lemaireocereus eruca Britton & Rose 1909

= Stenocereus eruca =

Species of cactus

Stenocereus eruca, commonly known as the creeping devil, is a member of the family Cactaceae. It is one of the most distinctive cacti, a member of the relatively small genus Stenocereus.

== Description ==
As with all cacti, creeping devil is succulent, and is reported to contain mescaline and sterols. Growth patterns can be widely scattered as individual stems; in favorable localities they can form impenetrable patches of branching stems measuring several meters across. The creeping devil is columnar, with a very spiny stem which is gray-green to creamy green in color, averaging 5 cm in diameter and 1.5–2 m long, with only the terminal end raised from the ground, with its shoot tips slightly angled upward. It often forms large mats. A height of 20–30 cm is normal since this cactus is recumbent. The cactus features 10 to 12 ribs, and it has 4 to 6 strong, flattened, dagger-like central spines that are grayish in color. The outer radial thorns, which vary in length and may be 10 to 17 in number, are whitish and somewhat rounded, measuring 10 to 15 millimeters long.The long, tubular, or peduncle-shaped, nocturnal flowers are white, pink, or yellow; usually 10–14 cm long with a spiny ovary, and flowering sparingly in response to rain. The round fruits are red, covered with thorns, and is 3–4 cm long with black seeds.

Creeping devil lies on the ground and grows at one end while the other end slowly dies, with a succession of new roots developing on the underside of the stem. Adventitious roots typically develop as well.The growth rate is adapted to the moderate, moist marine environment of the Baja peninsula, and can achieve in excess of 60 cm per year, but when transplanted to a hot, arid environment the cacti can grow as little as 60 cm per decade. Over the course of many years, the entire cactus will slowly travel, with stems branching and taking root toward the growing tips, while older stem portions die and disintegrate. This traveling chain of growth gives rise to the name eruca, which means "caterpillar", as well as the common name creeping devil.

Stenocereus eruca is considered the "most extreme case of clonal propagation in the cactus family" (Gibson and Nobel, 1986). This means that due to isolation and scarcity of pollinating creatures, the plant is able to clone itself. This is done by pieces detaching from the major shoot as their bases die and rot.

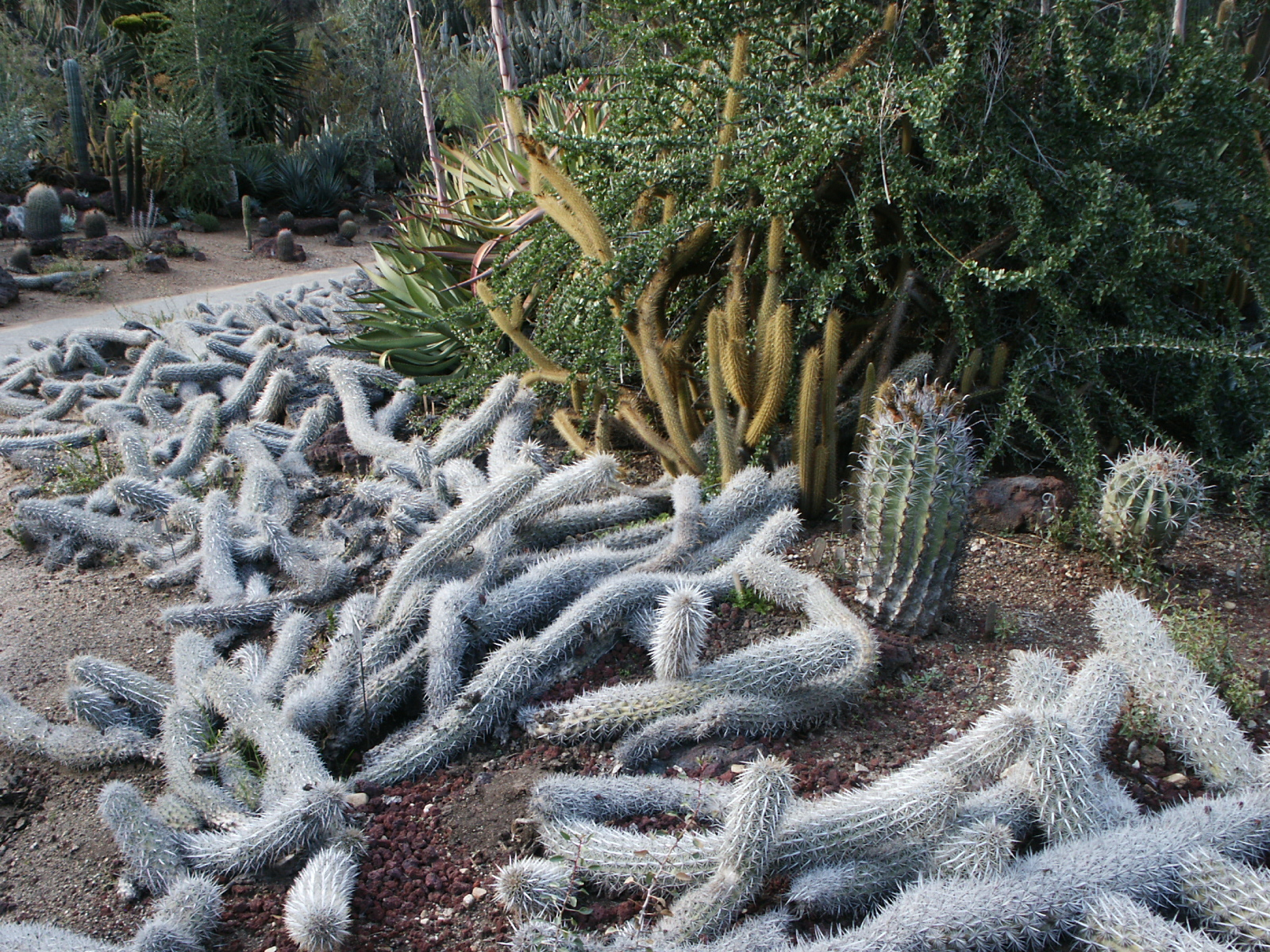
Creeping devils at Huntington Desert Garden

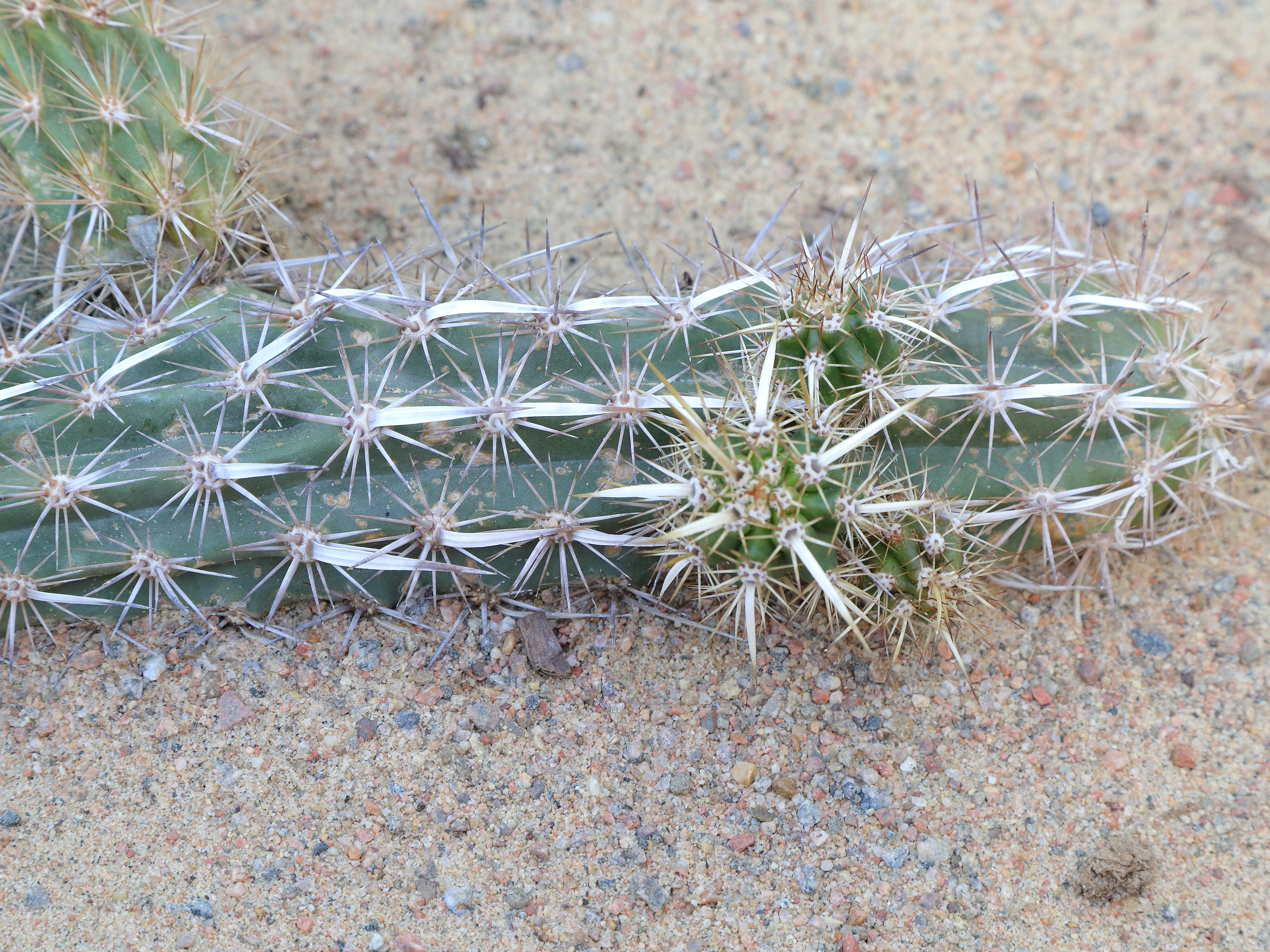
Spines close up

== Distribution ==
It is endemic to the Magdalena Plains in the central Pacific coast of Baja California Sur typically at altitudes up to 20 meters and is found only on sandy soils, where it forms massive colonies. Other members of this genus that are found in the Baja Peninsula of California are Stenocereus thurberi (Organ Pipe Cactus, Pitaya Dulce) and Stenocereus gummosus (Sour Pitaya, Pitaya Agria, Pitayha). While once thought to be threatened with extinction, further evidence showed it not to be so. Transplantation, while not recommended due to environmentally specific factors, can be successful with strict adherence to maintaining conditions which mirror the native environment.

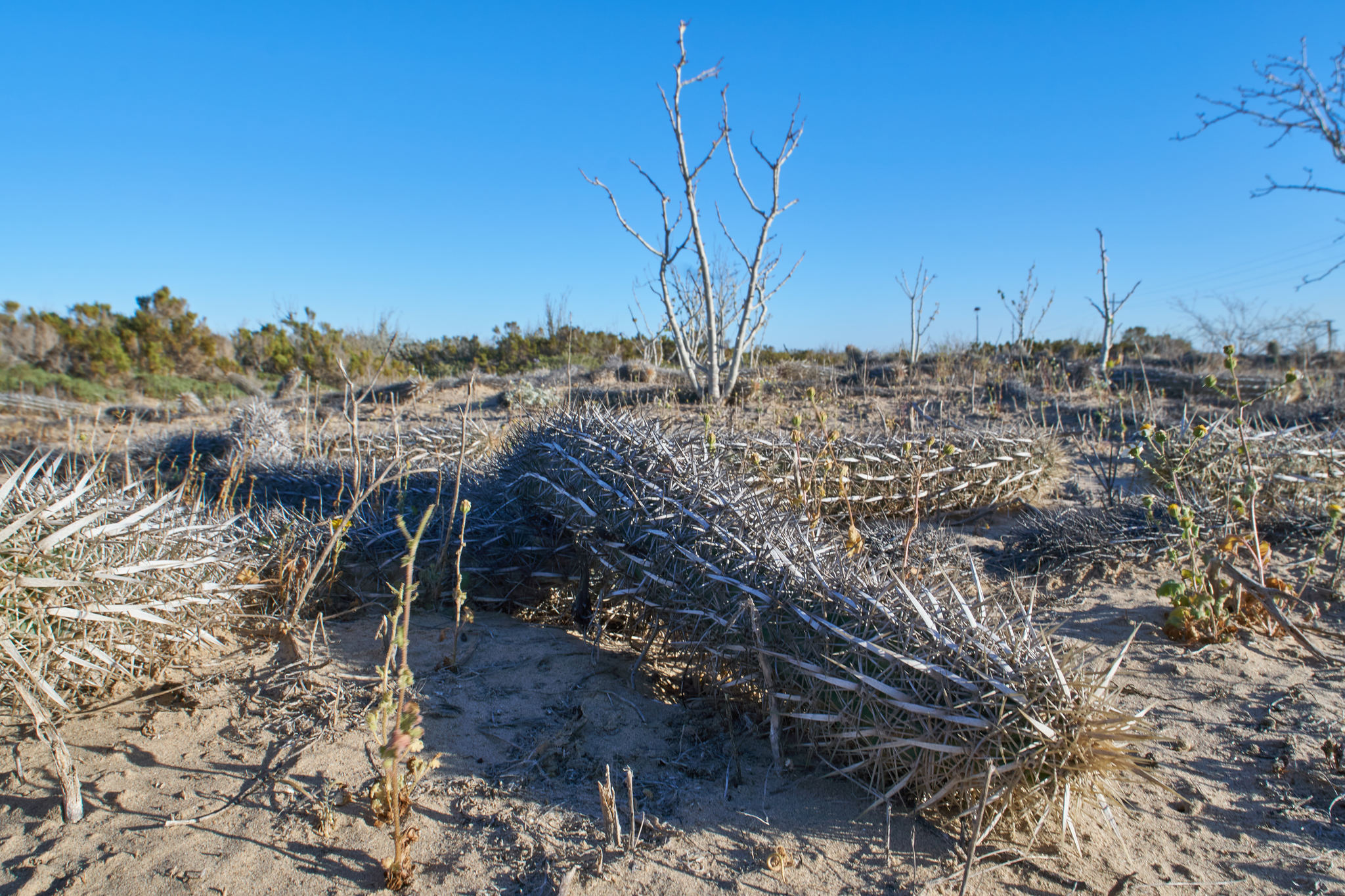
Creeping devil cactus in fog desert habitat near Puerto San Carlos, Baja California Sur

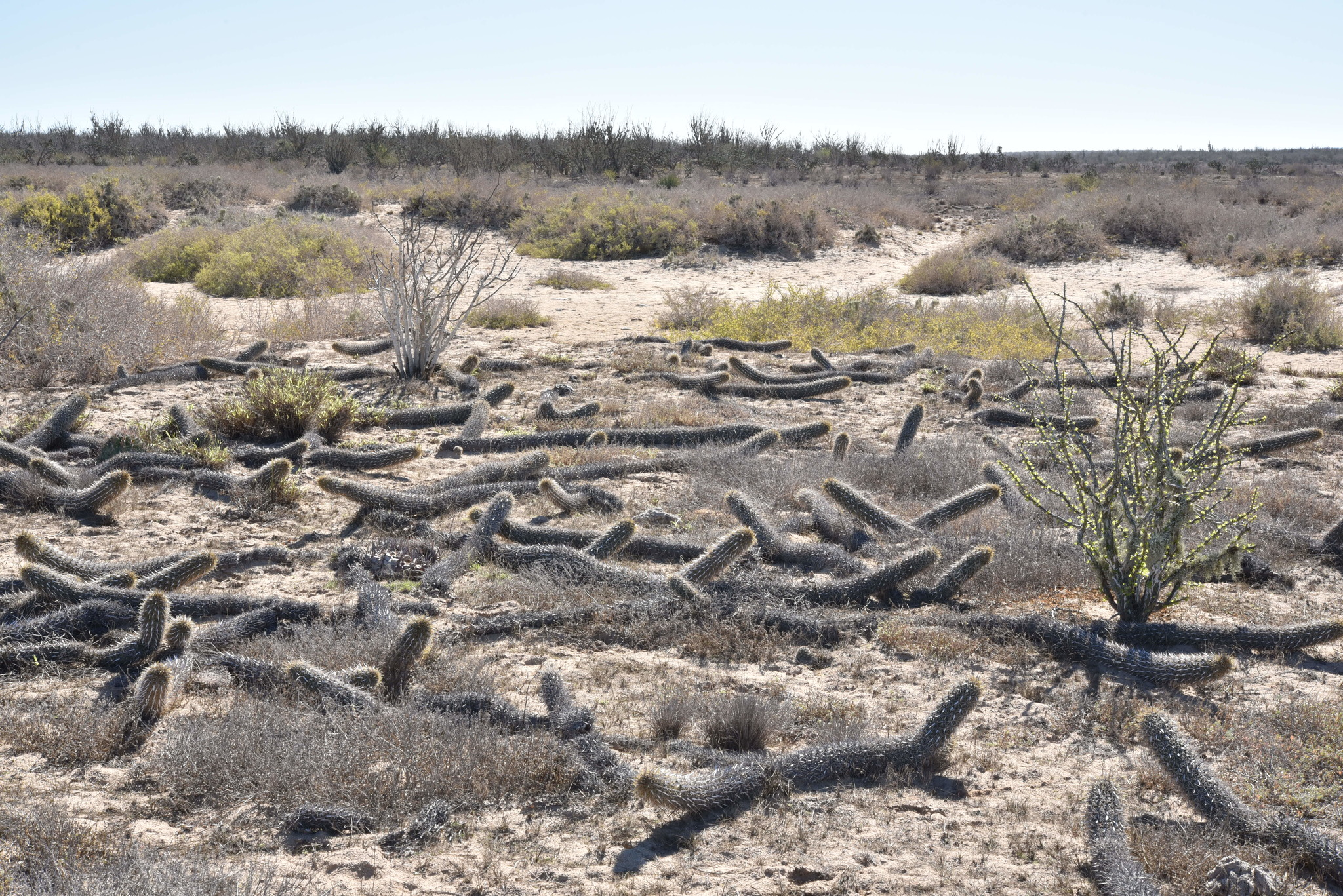
Habitat in La Florida, Baja California Sur, Mexico

== Taxonomy ==
The plant was first described as Cereus eruca in 1889 by Townshend Stith Brandegee. The name "eruca" may derive from the Latinization of the Spanish word "oruga," meaning 'caterpillar,' which refers to the appearance of its shoots. In 1979, Arthur Charles Gibson and Karl E. Horak reclassified the species under the genus Stenocereus.
