= Magdalena Bay =

Bay in Baja California Sur, Mexico

- Bahía Magdalena (Spanish)
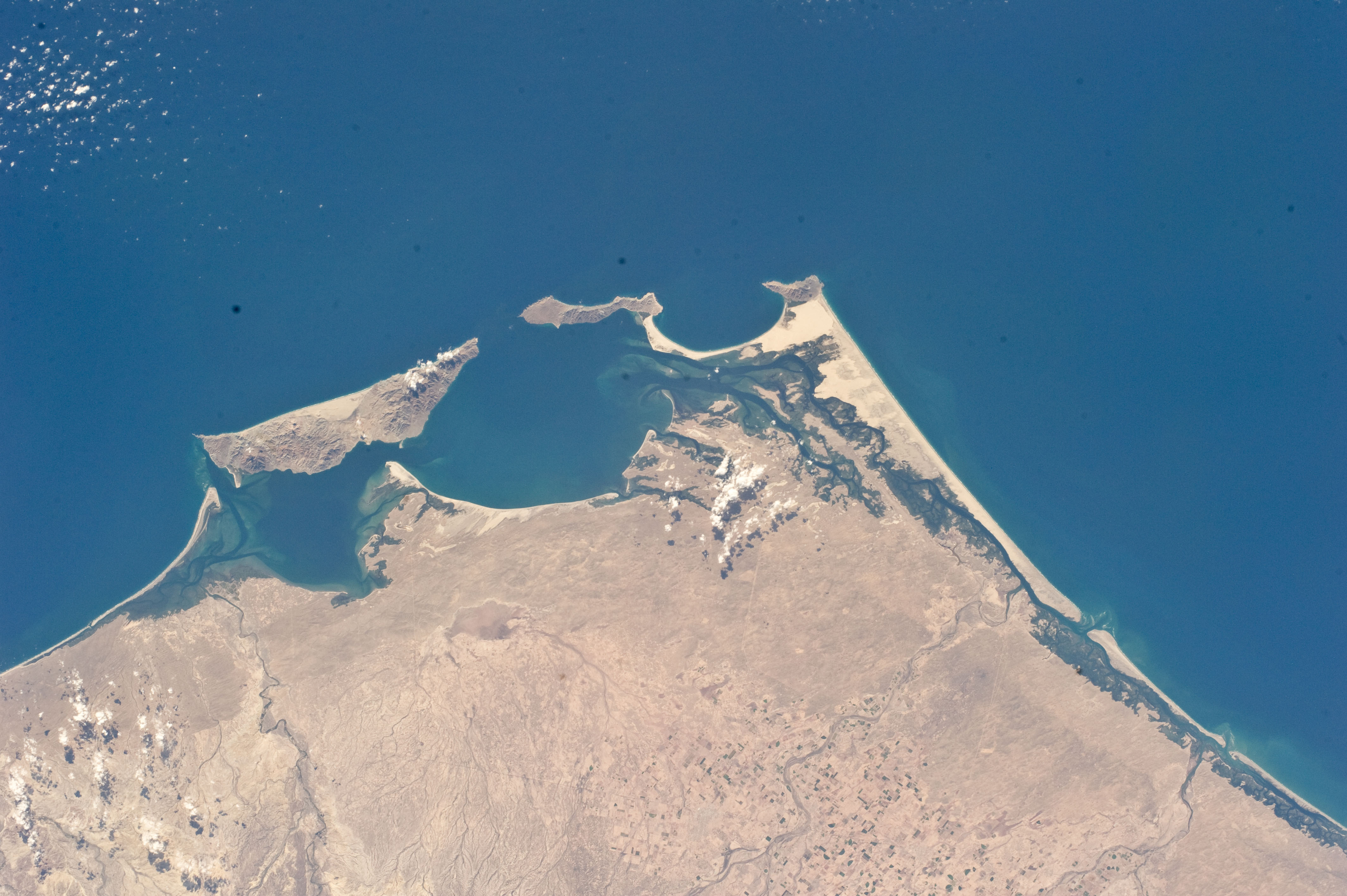
- As viewed from the ISS. North is to the right in this image.

- Location within Baja California Sur Location within Mexico
- Location: Comondú Municipality, Baja California Sur, Mexico.
- Coordinates: 24°35′N 112°00′W
- Etymology: Mary Magdalene
- Ocean/sea sources: Pacific Ocean
- Average depth: <20 m (66 ft)
- Max. depth: 45 m (148 ft)
- Settlements: Puerto San Carlos, Puerto Adolfo López Mateos, Puerto Alcatraz, Puerto Cortés, Puerto Magdalena

The Magdalena Bay (Spanish: Bahía Magdalena) is a saline bay and lagoon system in Comondú Municipality along the western coast of the Mexican state of Baja California Sur. It is protected from the Pacific Ocean by the barrier islands of Isla Magdalena and Isla Santa Margarita. The Magdalena Bay lagoon complex forms the largest embayment on the Pacific coast of the Baja California peninsula. The bay is ecologically important as one of the largest remaining coastal wetlands on the Pacific coast of North America, and the largest complex of mangrove forests on the peninsula, with over 200 km (124 mi) of estuaries and wetlands supporting wildlife, and the waterways serve as essential habitat for marine animals like gray whales and sea turtles and nurseries for fish and invertebrates. The surrounding coastal lowlands form a unique ecoregion and geophysical feature known as the Magdalena Plains, which includes an extensive fog desert characterized by a rich diversity of plant life and a number of endemic species.

== Geography ==
The Magdalena Bay is part of the Magdalena Bay lagoon complex, which is the largest embayment on the western Pacific coast of the Baja California peninsula, with a total area of about 1,409 km^{2} (544 mi^{2}). The lagoon complex is composed of three features, with the Zona de Canales to the northwest, the Magdalena Bay in the center, and Almejas Bay to the south. It is one of the largest remaining coastal wetlands on the Pacific coast of North America.

The Magdalena Bay is the largest, deepest and central feature within the lagoon complex. It is bordered to the west by Isla Magdalena, and to the south by Isla Santa Margarita. It has an area of about ~696 km^{2} (269 mi^{2}). The bay is connected to the Pacific Ocean by a ~5.5 km (3.4 mi) wide central channel, the Boca Entrada, which sits between the promontories of Punta Entrada on Isla Magdalena and Punta Redonda on Isla Santa Margarita. The Boca Entrada is the deepest part of the embayment, with a maximum depth of 45 m (148 ft). To the north it has a wide and shallow connection to the Zona de Canales, and to the south it is connected to Almejas Bay via the relatively narrow Canal Gaviota. On the mainland coast parallel to Isla Magdalena is the town of Puerto San Carlos, with 4,716 inhabitants in 2005. A deep channel from the Boca Entrada to the town allows for navigation.

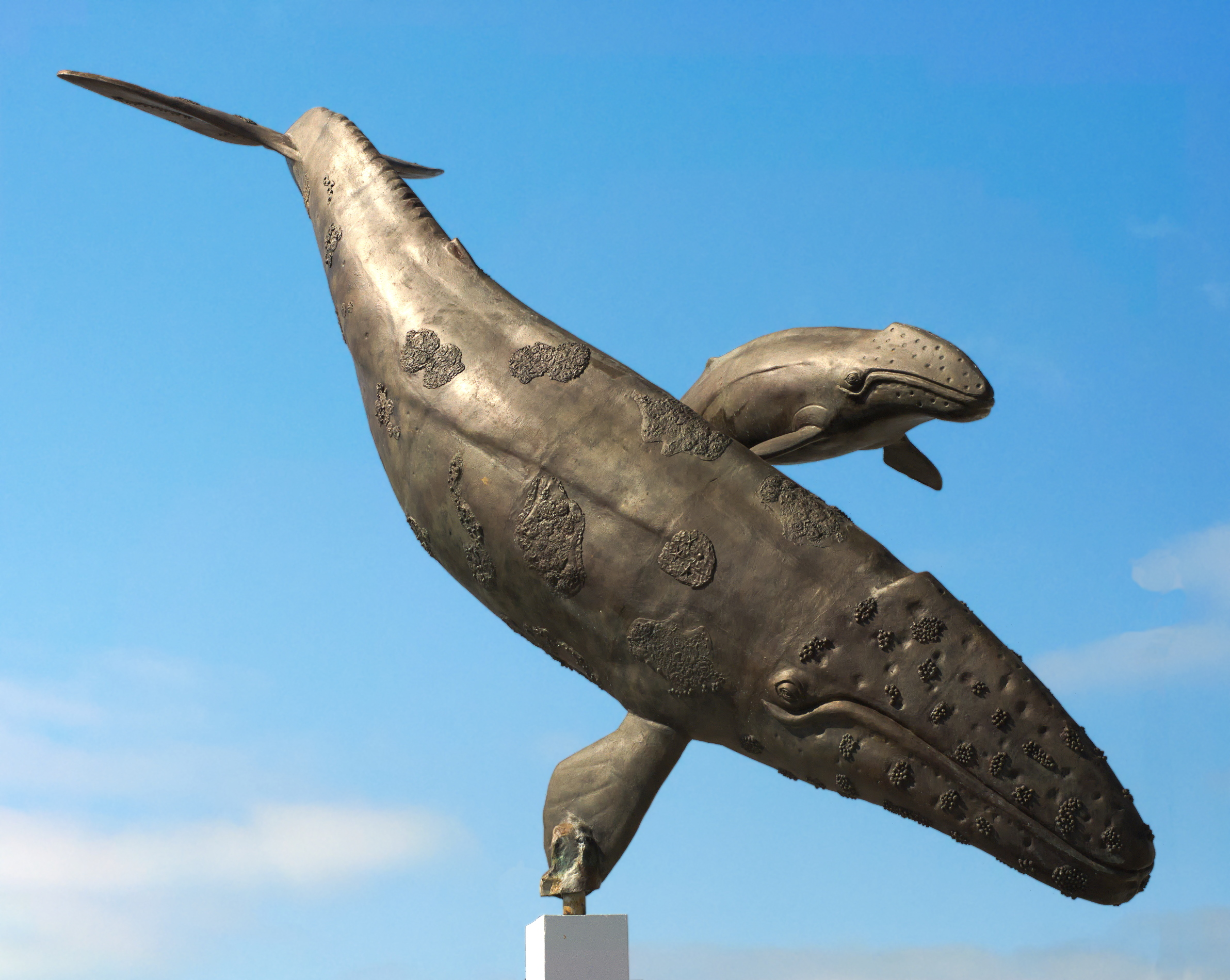
The gray whale sculpture in Puerto Adolfo López Mateos

The Zona de Canales is an 130 kilometres (80 mi) long and contiguous series of shallow channels, estuaries, and waterways that form the northwestern part of the lagoon complex. It is protected from the Pacific Ocean to the west by the sandy spit of Isla Magdalena. It has an area of about ~299 km^{2} (115 mi^{2}). Tidal fluctuations shape the coast here, creating a temporally variable and irregular littoral area. The landscape is one of vast sand dunes to the west on Isla Magdalena and mangrove swamps that line the estuaries and waterways to the east. To the north, three inlets connect the Zona de Canales to the Pacific; they are the Boca la Soledad, Boca Santo Domingo, and the Boca las Animas. The town of Puerto Adolfo López Mateos, with 2,171 inhabitants in 2005, is situated just south of the Boca la Soledad on the mainland side.

The Almejas Bay is the southern part of the lagoon complex. It is bounded from the Pacific by Isla Santa Margarita to the west, and Isla Cresciente to the south. It has an area of about ~414 km^{2} (160 mi^{2}). The shallow southeastern part is sometimes known as Santa Marina Bay. The deepest parts of Almejas Bay are inshore from Isla Santa Margarita and in the Canal Gaviota north to Magdalena Bay, with a maximum depth of 27 m (89 ft). There are two connections to the Pacific; the Canal Rehusa, which separates Isla Santa Margarita from Isla Cresciente, and the Boca Flor de Malva, at the southeastern end of the Santa Marina Bay. Both inlets are shallow and have strong currents, typically preventing navigation.

The Magdalena Plains, also known as the Santo Domingo Valley, are a distinctive geologic and orographic feature that form the eastern part of the bay and stretch from San Juanico in the north to Todos Santos in the south. The region consists of the volcanic hills and mesas of the western drainage of the Sierra de la Giganta and the low, flat and extensive sandy plains that border the Pacific Ocean. The plains have a gentle east-west slope, with an average elevation of 50 m (160 ft) above sea level, and are composed of easily eroded Quaternary alluvial plains and Tertiary sandstone.

=== Islands ===
The bay and lagoon system contains three main islands:

- Isla Magdalena, mostly to the north and facing west, is a 90 km (56 mi) long, slender, segmented island that follows the coast. There is a small settlement, Puerto Magdalena, with a population of 112 inhabitants in 2005. Most of the island is a landscape of low-lying sand dunes, with some rocky terrain in the southern part of the island.
- Isla Santa Margarita, to the south, parallels the southwest-facing coast and is approximately 33.8 km (21.0 mi) long by 7.2 km (4.5 mi) wide. It is a rocky island with cliffs and a peak, Monte Margarita, with a maximum elevation of 566 m (1,857 ft) above sea level. On its inland side is Puerto Cortés, the site of a naval base administered from the 2nd Military Naval Region in Ensenada, Baja California. It has a military-only airstrip. There is also a fishing village, Puerto Alcatraz, which had a population of 143 in 2005.
- Isla Cresciente is a narrow barrier island in the southernmost part of the Almejas Bay, approximately 23 km (14 mi) long. It hosts seasonal fishing camps for catching clams, and is a designated refuge area for aquatic birds and marine mammals.

=== Geology ===
The rocky islands of the Magdalena Bay are similar in lithology to the California Coast Ranges, and are composed of metamorphic rocks like those of the Franciscan Complex. The islands are part of a geomorphic province that also includes Cedros Island and the Vizcaíno Peninsula, representing oceanic rocks scraped from the seafloor of the Pacific plate (ophiolite) and metamorphosed mantle rocks brought to the surface (serpentine), marking an ancient convergent boundary with the North American plate.

== Biodiversity ==
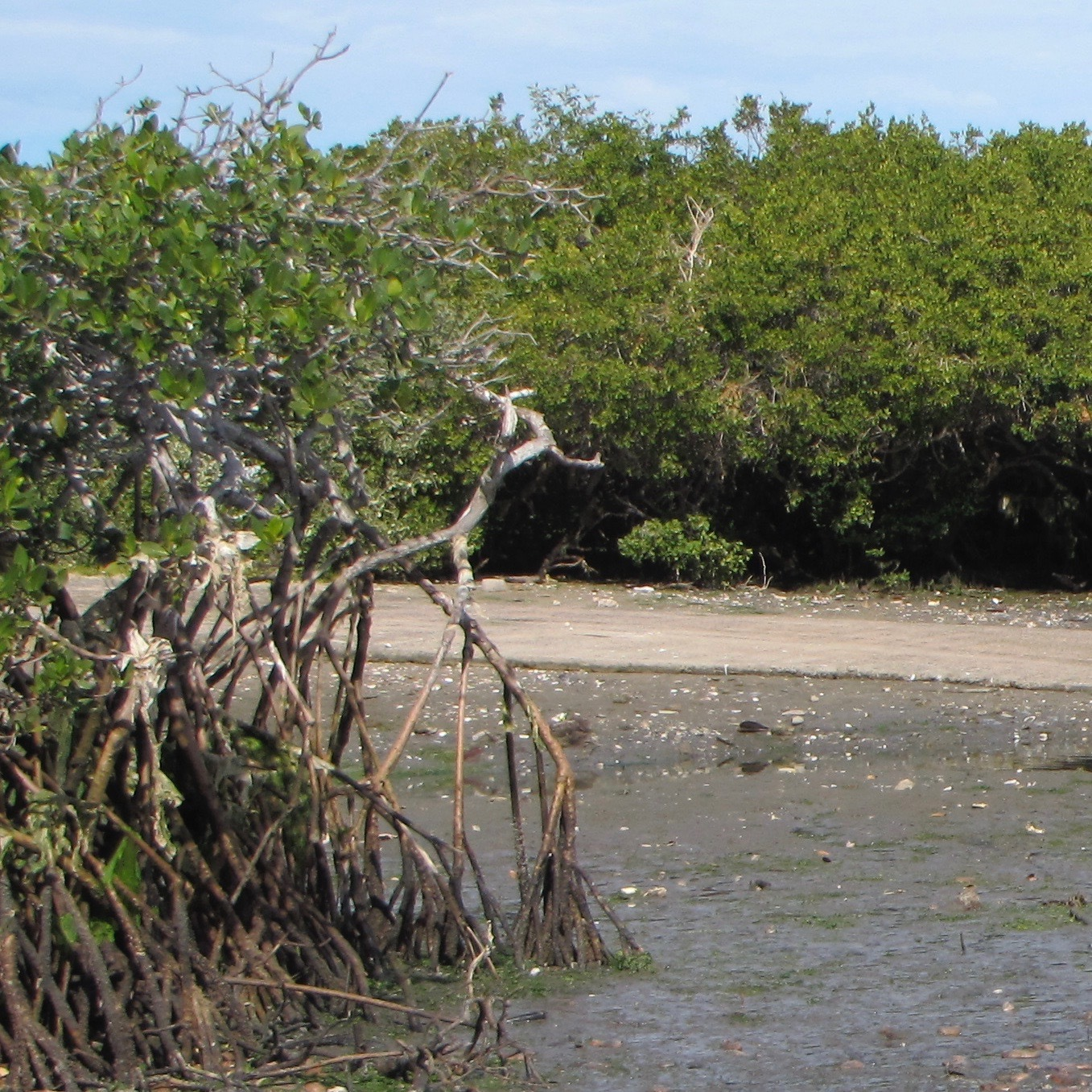
Mangroves in the Magdalena Bay

The Magdalena Bay is the largest complex of mangrove lagoons on the Baja California Peninsula, with over 200 km (124 mi) of estuaries and wetlands stretching the bay. Protected from the Pacific Ocean by an extensive series of barrier islands, these saltwater lagoons shelter dense numbers of red (Rhizophora mangle), white (Laguncularia racemosa), and black mangroves (Avicennia germinans). The mangrove thickets serve as a nursery for many fish species, like the Pacific sardine (Saldinops sagax), as well as a number of commercially valuable shellfish, like oysters (Striostrea prismatica), chocolate clams (Megapitoria squalida), black abalone (Haliotis cracherodii), green abalone (Haliotis fulgens), and pink abalone (Haliotis corrugata). The mangrove swamps also serve as important sanctuaries for seabirds.

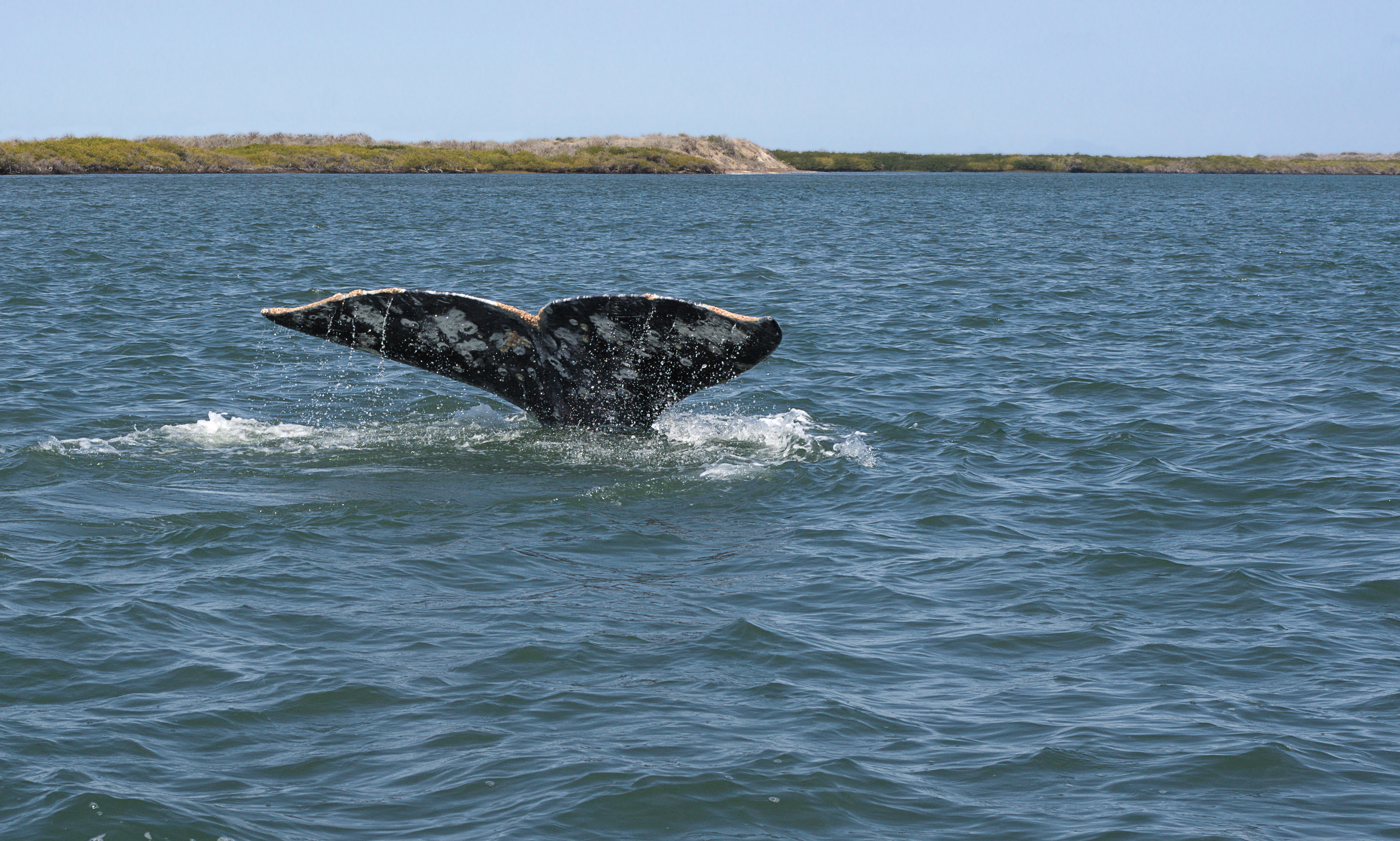
A female gray whale in the Zona de Canales

The bay is particularly noted for the seasonal migration of the California gray whales that come here during winter to calve. The bay is also popular for commercial and sports fishing. The bay includes the small fishing port of San Carlos, as well as Puerto López Mateos, which provides a good place to observe the whales. The islands of the bay also include endemic species of plants, like the Santa Margarita agave (Agave margaritae) and the Magdalena cochemiea (Cochemiea halei).

The Magdalena Plains are also notable as a distinct ecoregion. Because of cool upwelling from the Pacific Ocean, the sandy plains receive substantial moisture in the form of thick morning fogs, creating a unique fog desert ecosystem. Epiphytic bromeliads like ball-moss (Tillandsia recurvata) and lichens like Ramalina menziesii abundantly grow on plants near the coast. The environment is dominated by giant columnar cacti like the elephant cactus (Pachycereus pringlei) in the plains and desert trees (Bursera, Prosopsis, Fouquieria, Parkinsonia, and Cyrtocarpa spp.) in the arroyos. Endemic to the Magdalena Plains is the creeping devil cactus (Stenocereus eruca), a bizarre columnar cactus that grows on the ground like a snake.

Flora of the Magdalena region
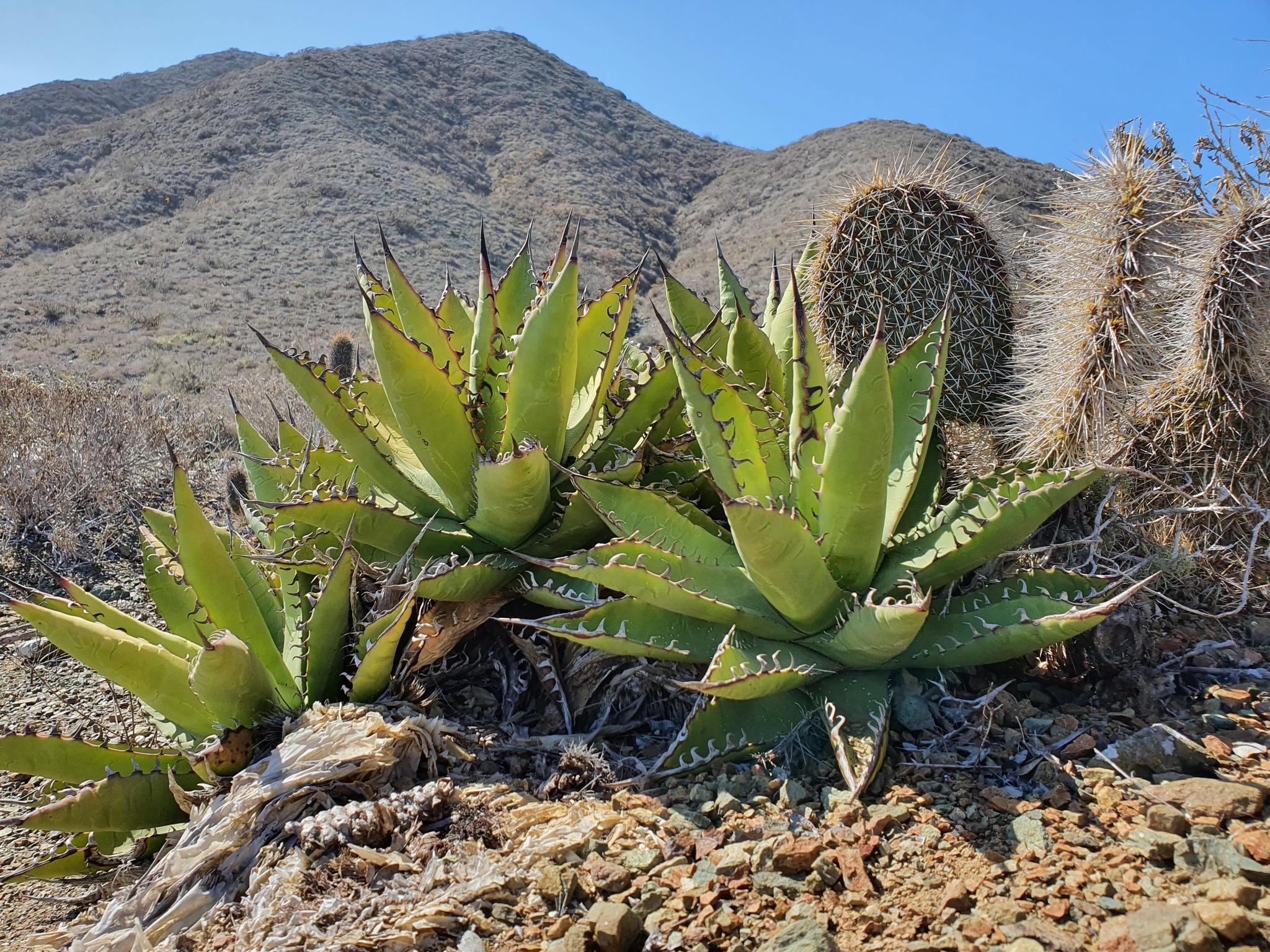
Agave margaritae

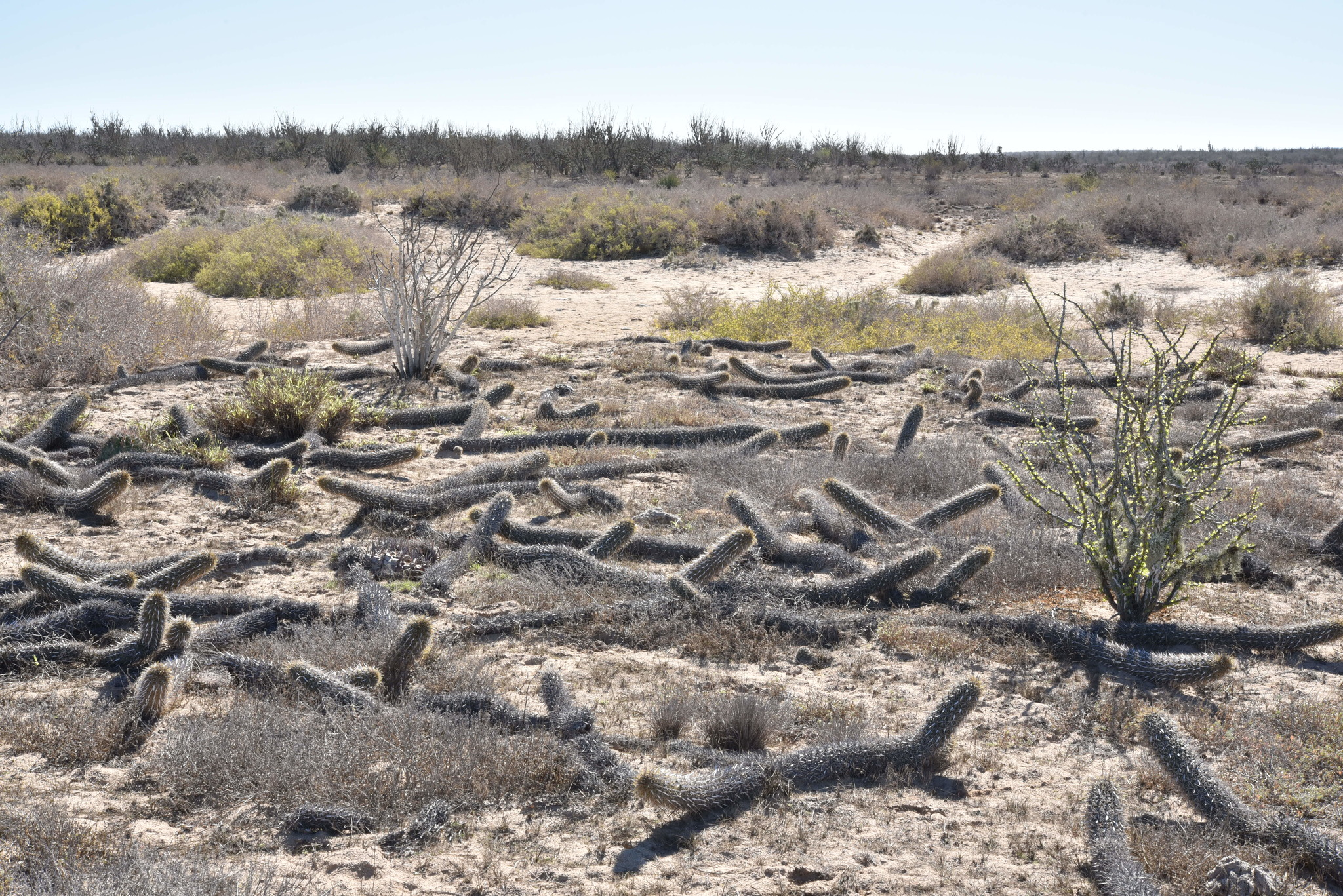
Stenocereus eruca

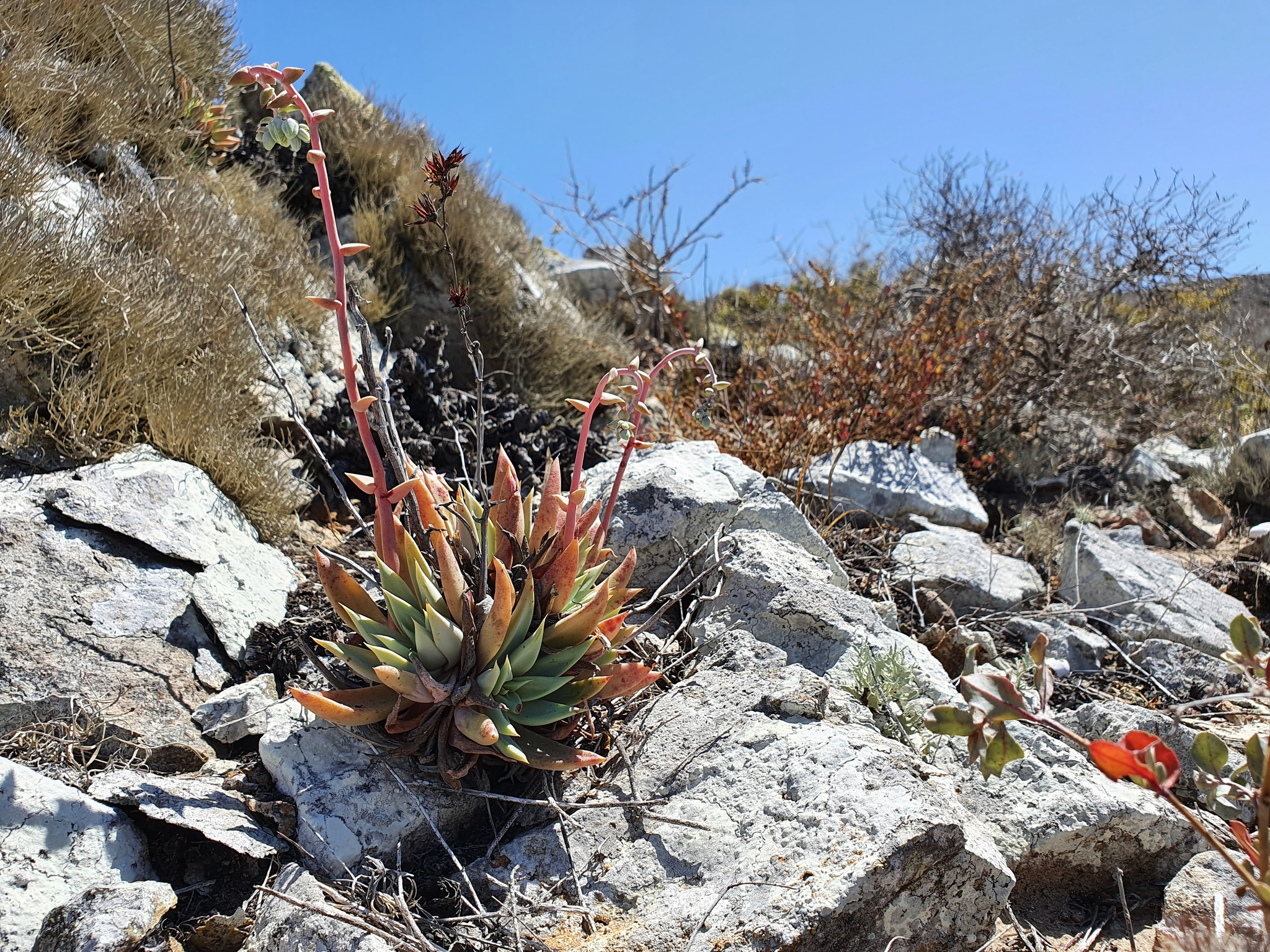
Dudleya albiflora

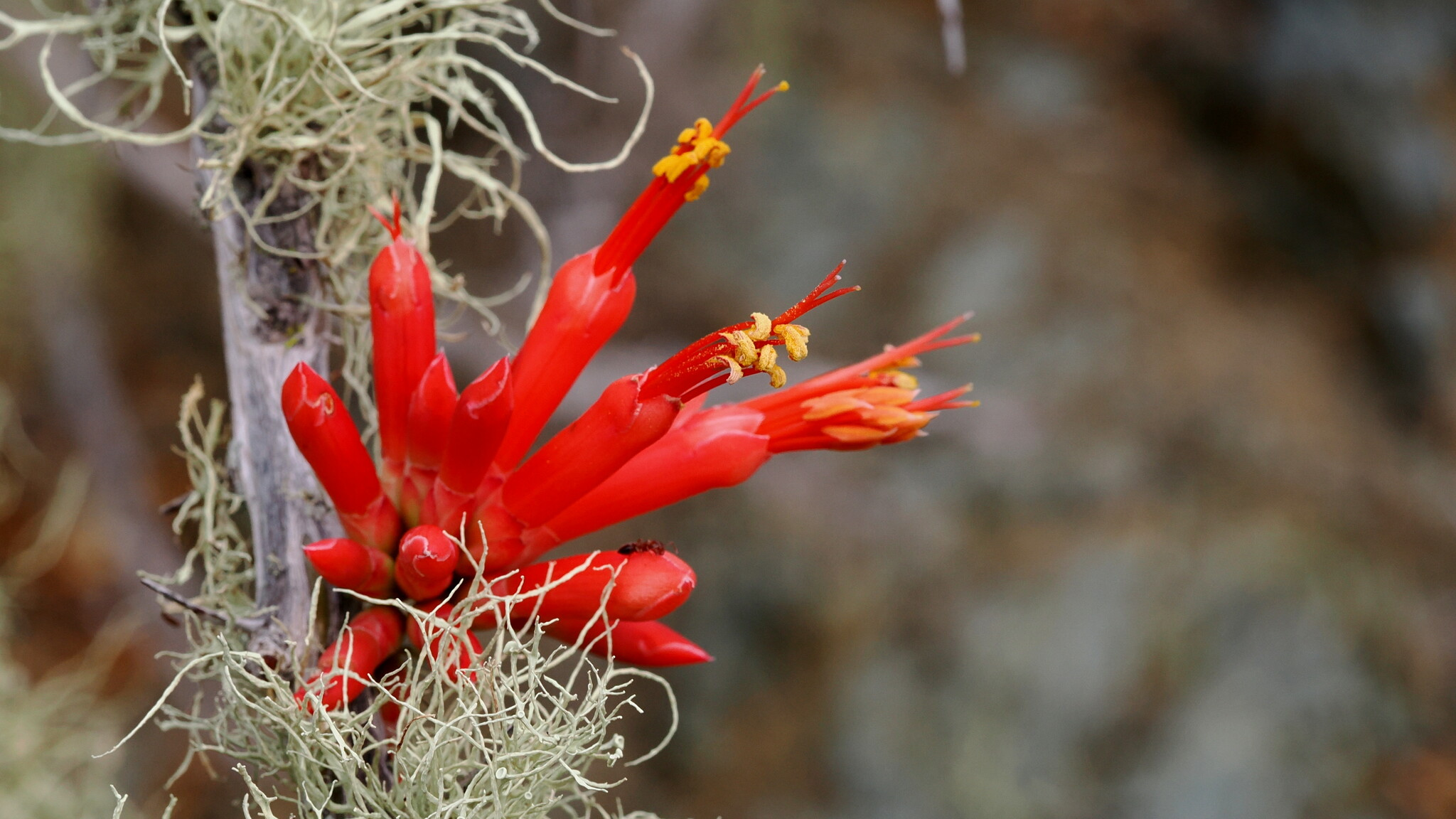
Fouquieria diguetii

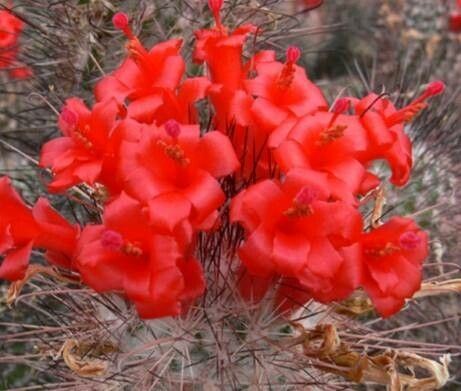
Cochemiea halei

== History ==
=== Early exploration and whaling ===
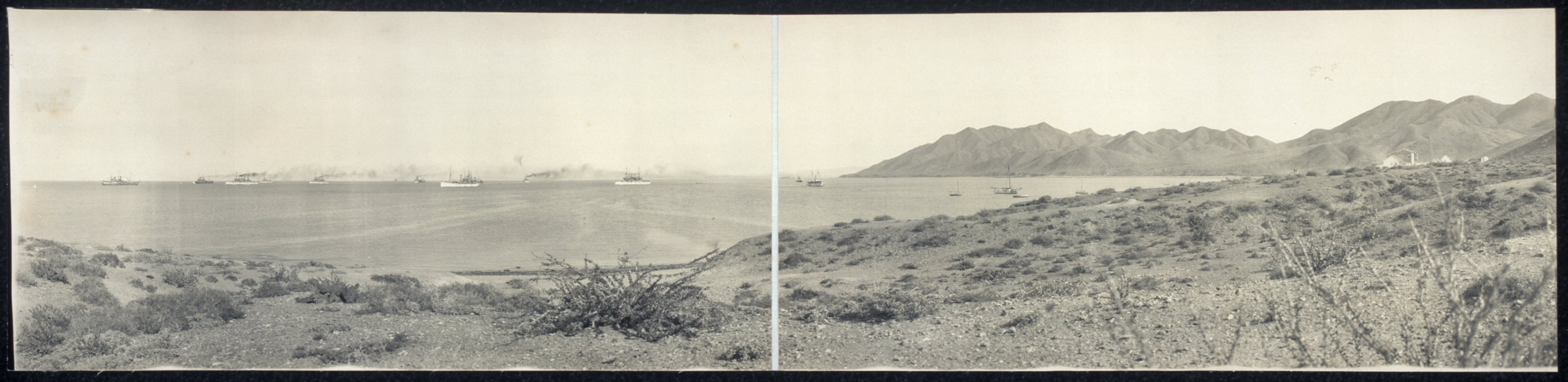
"Man of War Cove", Magdalena Bay, March 1908

In 1539, Hernán Cortés arranged for Spanish explorer Francisco de Ulloa to explore the Pacific Coast of Mexico. He possibly was the first to navigate the extensive bay, calling it Santa Catalina.

In March of 1602, the Spanish viceroy in Mexico City, Gaspar de Zúñiga, 5th Count of Monterrey, appointed Sebastián Vizcaíno in charge of an expedition to locate safe harbors in the Californias for the Manila galleons to use on their return voyages. Upon finding the bay, Vizcaíno named it Bahia Santa Maria Magdalena.

As early as 1837 American whaleships visited the bay to cooper their oil and hunt sperm whales outside the bay. Between 1845–46 and 1865–66, American, as well as a few French, Dutch, and Russian, whaleships hunted gray whales in the bay during their winter calving season. They primarily caught cows and calves, but began catching bulls as the former became scarce. During the peak years from the winters of 1855–56 to 1864–65, an estimated 1,250 gray whales were caught in the bay, with a peak of about 250 whales taken by seventeen vessels in the winter of 1856–57. They also visited the bay to obtain wood, catch fish and turtles, and harvest oysters.

After the conclusion of the Mexican–American War in the 1840s, piracy of resources by American merchant ships was common in the region, stealing giant clams and magnesite. Because of the bay's safe and secluded nature, it quickly found use as an anchorage for a number of the world's navies without the consent of the Mexican government, who had trouble policing the desolate and unpopulated region.

=== Colonization attempts ===
During the later half of the 19th century, the Magdalena Bay was the nucleus for a number of failed colonization attempts by American businessmen.

In October 1862, under the leadership of the American pioneer Jacob P. Leese, a group of speculators obtained a grant from the Mexican government to colonize a large part of Baja California, including the Magdalena Bay, in a large concession ranging from the 31° N parallel south to the 24° N, which included a land area of about 50,000 mi^{2} (130,000 km^{2}). The Lower California Colonization and Mining Company was organized with a capital of US$40,000 (equivalent to $1,290,000 in 2025) and issued two hundred shares of stock at US$200 (equivalent to $6,450 in 2025) each. The company promised 320 acres (130 ha) of land for each investor, free passage to the colony, and mutual interest in all valuable mines, with a settlement near what is now La Ventana. The company quickly failed to live up to its promises, and after most of the colonists fled, the grant was retracted by the Mexican government, and in May 1866 Leese transferred his land rights to the New York-based Lower California Company.

The Lower California Company would focus on the Magdalena Bay and the Magdalena Plains as the area for settlement. The new company quickly made a number of promises to attract colonists, offering free land, duty-free trade, exemptions from taxation and conscription from the Mexican government, and promoted the region as being a rich agricultural paradise with fine climate, with a lavish town, the "City of Cortez". The company advertised these promises through lectures, articles, and letters throughout California. Those hired by the company to reconnoiter the area were significantly more skeptical as to the desirability of the region, and suggested it would be a better idea to settle Chinese colonists there instead. Most investors ignored these concerns, and the company had made a contract to colonize the bay with about two hundred families by May 1871.

In February 1871, investors soon found themselves deceived, as contrary to the company's claims of a free port at Magdalena Bay, the Mexican government stated that the only port of entry for Baja California was La Paz. Soon after, a group of colonists who had set out in December 1870 returned to San Francisco with great disappointment. They had found that the land was a barren desert with little amenities, hardly any arable land, and that the "City of Cortez" was little more than a farce. The company responded with a series of letters written by supposed colonists in The Daily Alta California lauding the country, which were revealed to be written by employees of the company in an exposé. As more colonists returned defrauded and deceived, the company aggressively stepped up its advertising.

Fortunes for the company turned around when it was discovered that the abundant lichens that covered the coastal landscape were valuable sources of orcein (orchilla), which at the time was used for dye. The company changed course, and put out enormous advertisements in newspapers offering US$30 (equivalent to $806.25 in 2025) a month pay, 160 acres (65 ha) of free land, and free room and board for orchilla pickers. Soon, about 300 orchilla pickers departed from New York, most of them impoverished or foreign immigrants, seeking great fortunes in the Magdalena Bay. They would discover that there was no room and board, little to eat outside of rations of rice and beans, and hardly any water. By July 1871, the Lower California Company's reputation was declining and the public was losing interest. In September, in a last-ditch attempt to save the company, they proposed to transfer the communist prisoners of the Paris Commune to the Magdalena Bay and use it as a penal colony. The French government took this proposal seriously, but by the end of that month, the government of Mexico annulled the Lower California Company's grant because of their failure to meet the agreed conditions.

The grant was then transferred to another American, Joseph P. Hale, who also formed a company to administer the land. Hale failed to meet many of conditions of the grant, but managed to keep the land thanks to the passive attitude towards foreigners under Porfirio Díaz's government, and he was given a clear title to the land in 1885. Hale would die in 1893, and his land saw little activity outside of magnetite mining and the orchilla harvesting, which was then ruined by the rise of aniline dyes. In 1903 his heirs sold most of the property to the Maine-based Chartered Company of Lower California, whose owners soon learned how unprofitable the land was and quickly sought buyers.

=== American and German intrigue ===
While attempts to colonize the Magdalena Bay for commercial interests mostly failed, the strategic location and protected nature of the bay proved desirable for a number of naval powers at the turn of the century. In 1902, Kaiser Wilhelm II attempted to purchase the bay from the Chartered Company through an intermediary, hoping to give the German Empire a strategic naval foothold in the western hemisphere. The American lawyer representing the company in London quickly broke off negotiations and alerted Ambassador Joseph H. Choate, who then relayed the information to United States Secretary of State John Hay. This incident caused considerable alarm for Hay and Choate, and they agreed that the bay should never fall into the hands of any foreign power.

The United States already had long-standing military interests in the bay. In 1883, the Secretary of State Frederick Frelinghuysen obtained permission for landing coal duty-free at Magdalena Bay, which was followed by the establishment of an auxiliary coaling station there. in 1889, Secretary of State James Blaine tried to arrange the purchase of Magdalena Bay for the United States. The Mexican government turned down the suggestion, and amended their constitution to prevent the loss of territory in response. In 1900, the Mexican government granted the United States Navy permission to use Magdalena Bay as a practice gunnery and bombing range, which it did until 1910. In 1908, an American fleet of sixteen battleships on a cruise around the world, the Great White Fleet, stopped in the bay and carried out gunnery practice for two weeks.

German interest in the region resurfaced with concerns over Japanese influence in Mexico. In 1908, the Kaiser reported to the American ambassador that there were 10,000 Japanese in Mexico, and suggested that the Japanese posed an imminent threat to the United States. While the Kaiser's concerns were mostly alarmist, Japanese economic penetration and influence was growing in Mexico, and President Díaz was increasingly friendly towards the Japanese. Even before the Kaiser's remarks, the American Minister in Guatemala had reported rumors that Japan had negotiated a secret treaty to lease Magdalena Bay from Mexico, although these early rumors were entirely without evidence. While President Roosevelt downplayed the inflammatory claims made by the Germans, concerns over Japanese naval strength in the Pacific was becoming an increasing source of consternation for the Americans.

In 1912, there were rumors that Japan tried to purchase the harbor from Mexico. Barbara Tuchman's book The Zimmerman Telegram mentions both the German kaiser and the Japanese Emperor as attempting to utilize this bay and perhaps Whale Bay for military naval purposes. In response, the United States Senate adopted the Lodge Corollary to the Monroe Doctrine.

=== Contemporary history ===
Migrating rancher families from the inland settled in the area in the 1920s, like the Lucero family, who founded the town of Puerto Adolfo López Mateos. More significant developments for the region began in the late 1950s, when a fish cannery was constructed in Puerto Adolfo López Mateos, and in the 1960s a port and cannery facilities were constructed in Puerto San Carlos. The same period also saw the arrival of many migrants from mainland Mexico to the Santo Domingo Valley to the east of the bay in search of agricultural jobs. Many of these migrants later moved to the bay to work in the newly-opened cannery facilities.

The 1980s and 1990s were unproductive years for agriculture and fishing, which created a regional economic depression. Since then, whale watching and ecotourism has grown in importance to the regional economy.
